= List of longest managerial reigns in association football =

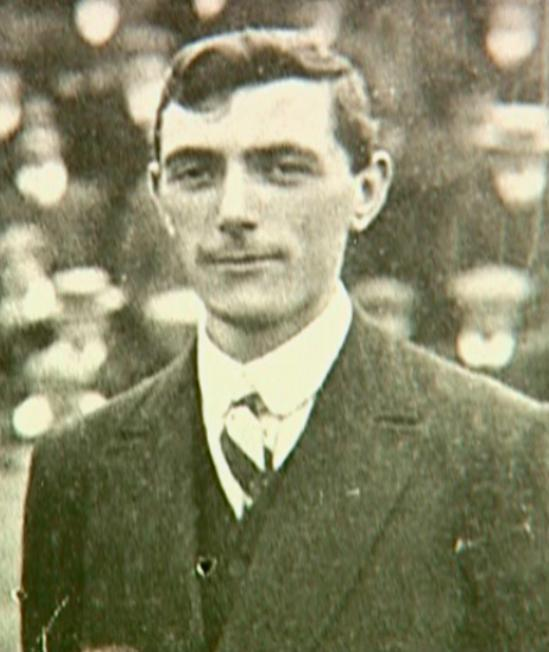
Fred Everiss managed West Bromwich Albion from 1902 to 1948—the second longest managerial reign of all time.

The longest managerial reign in association football belongs to Englishman Jimmy Davies who was manager of Waterloo Dock for 50 years. Second to this, Fred Everiss was manager of Football League team West Bromwich Albion for over 45 years, starting his reign in 1902 and ending when he retired in 1948. (Note: James Black was manager and secretary for Forfar Athletic during 66 years uninterrupted years.) The longest post-war reign belongs to Frenchman Guy Roux, who managed Auxerre in three separate reigns totalling 44 years, taking them from France's fifth division to become Division 1 champions in 1996.

Managerial reigns in football have decreased since the 1960s, and by 2015, the average spell in England's top four divisions was 1.23 years. Managers such as Pep Guardiola and Béla Guttmann have been proponents of a "three-year rule", as has football journalist and author Jonathan Wilson, who writes that managers can succumb to a "fatalistic idealism" beyond this period, describing it as similar to a Greek tragedy.

== Longest reigns ==
In the early decades of organised football, team selection was often conducted by committee among the club directors, with an appointed 'secretary-manager' dealing with player contracts and other administrative tasks, assisted by 'trainers' dealing with coaching and fitness matters. As the secretary role was largely clerical and often occupied by one of the directors, they tended to remain in post for many years regardless of results in the short term. Until after World War I, some clubs never had a manager by name.

As demands and expectations on officials increased both on and off the field, gradually specialist roles became commonplace, and by the end of the 1930s, it was common for clubs in the British Isles to have an official manager as a figurehead dealing with most or all team matters, but with less long-term job security than the secretary-managers of old. Elsewhere, the separation between the office and pitchside functions persisted: the head coach in charge of training and match tactics became increasingly respected and prominent, but meanwhile while a figure closer to the ownership in the role of general manager, sporting director or director of football maintained control over financial and commercial aspects, with the levels of influence and balance of power between the coach and director varying between clubs and nations. As in the earlier era, the director would often have a tenure of several years to oversee the overall progress of the club, while the head coach would typically keep their job only for as long as the on-field results were positive.

For the purpose of this list, a separation has been made between pre-World War II reigns, which includes many secretary-managers, and the period after the conflict ended when regular competitions resumed in most countries, and longer managerial/head coach appointments became far less commonplace. For those whose terms spanned World War II, they have been placed in the section covering the majority of their reign. Long serving head coaches in international football are also recorded separately below.

=== Clubs ===
==== Pre-1946 ====
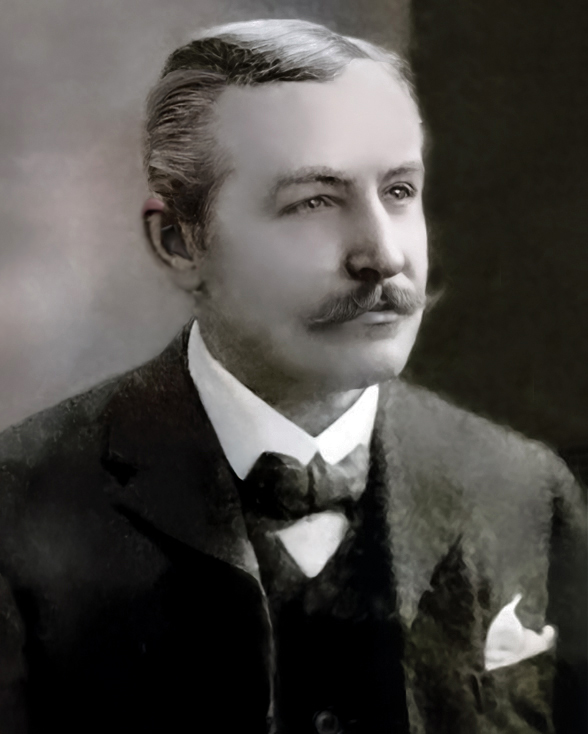
George Ramsay was secretary-manager of Aston Villa from 1884 to 1926, during which time he established Villa as the most successful club in England.

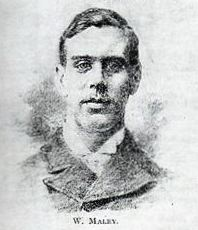
Willie Maley was manager of Celtic from 1897 to 1940.

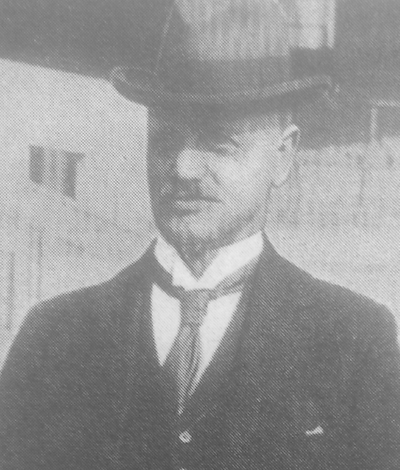
John Nicholson was secretary-manager of Sheffield United from 1899 to 1932.

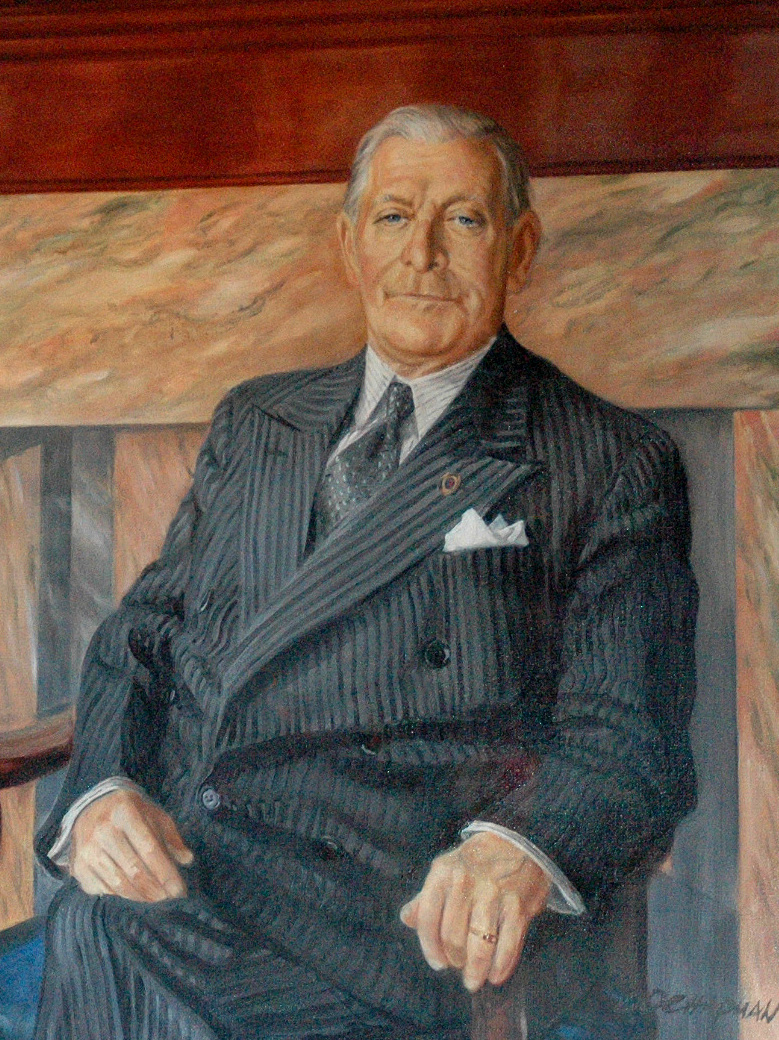
Bill Struth was the Rangers manager from 1920 to 1954.

Longest managerial reigns (pre-1946)
Rank	Manager	Club	From	To	Length	Reference
1	(England) Fred Everiss	(England) West Bromwich Albion	1 August 1902	31 May 1948	45 years, 304 days	
2	(Scotland) Willie Maley	(Scotland) Celtic	1 September 1897	1 February 1940	42 years, 153 days	
3	(Scotland) George Ramsay	(England) Aston Villa	1 August 1884	31 May 1926	41 years, 303 days	
4	(England) Jack Addenbrooke	(England) Wolverhampton Wanderers	1 August 1885	1 June 1922	36 years, 304 days	
5	(Scotland) John Hunter	(Scotland) Motherwell	30 April 1911	1 May 1946	35 years, 1 day	
6	(Scotland) Frank Watt	(England) Newcastle United	1 August 1895	1 January 1930	34 years, 153 days	
7	(Scotland) Bill Struth	(Scotland) Rangers	20 May 1920	15 June 1954	34 years, 26 days	
8	(Scotland) John Nicholson	(England) Sheffield United	1 May 1899	1 April 1932	32 years, 336 days	
9	(England) Sam Allen	(England) Swindon Town	1 July 1902	1 April 1933	30 years, 274 days	
10	(England) Syd King	(England) West Ham United	1 April 1902	1 November 1932	30 years, 214 days	
11	(England) Arthur Dickinson	(England) Sheffield Wednesday	1 August 1891	31 May 1920	28 years, 304 days	
12	(England) Charlie Webb	(England) Brighton & Hove Albion	1 July 1919	1 June 1947	27 years, 335 days	
13	(Scotland) Bob Jack	(England) Plymouth Argyle	1 August 1910	1 April 1938	27 years, 243 days	
14	(Scotland) David Calderhead	(England) Chelsea	1 August 1907	1 June 1933	25 years, 304 days	
15	(Scotland) George Easton	(Scotland) Partick Thistle	15 August 1903	1 April 1929	25 years, 229 days	
16	(Scotland) Johnny Madden	(Czech Republic) Slavia Prague	15 February 1905	1 June 1930	25 years, 106 days	
17	(England) Charles Foweraker	(England) Bolton Wanderers	1 July 1919	1 August 1944	25 years, 31 days	
18	(England) Jimmy Seed	(England) Charlton Athletic	16 May 1933	1 October 1956	23 years, 138 days	
19	(Ireland) Bob Kyle	(England) Sunderland	1 August 1905	5 May 1928	22 years, 278 days	
20	(England) Harry Curtis	(England) Brentford	1 May 1926	1 February 1949	22 years, 276 days	
21	(England) Joe Smith	(England) Blackpool	19 August 1935	30 April 1958	22 years, 254 days	
22	(England) Fred Stewart	(Wales) Cardiff City	1 May 1911	1 May 1933	22 years, 0 days	
23	(Scotland) Willie Nicol	(Scotland) Falkirk	16 August 1902	9 February 1924	21 years, 177 days	
24	(Scotland) William Wilton	(Scotland) Rangers	19 August 1899	2 May 1920	20 years, 257 days	
25	(Scotland) Willie McAndrew	(Scotland) Hamilton Academical	3 October 1925	26 January 1946	20 years, 115 days	
26	(England) Teddy Davison	(England) Sheffield United	1 June 1932	1 August 1952	20 years, 61 days	
27	(Scotland) Jimmy Philip	(Scotland) Aberdeen	20 August 1904	19 April 1924	19 years, 243 days	
28	(Scotland) Bob McGlashan	(Scotland) Arbroath	1 June 1927	1 June 1946	19 years, 0 days	
29	(Scotland) Bob Cochrane	(Scotland) Greenock Morton	15 August 1908	1 June 1927	18 years, 290 days	
30	(England) Tom Watson	(England) Liverpool	26 July 1896	16 May 1915	18 years, 294 days	
31	(England) Edmund Goodman	(England) Crystal Palace	1 April 1907	1 November 1925	18 years, 214 days	
32	(Scotland) Paddy Travers	(Scotland) Clyde	27 November 1937	28 April 1956	18 years, 153 days	
33	(Scotland) Hugh Spence	(Scotland) Kilmarnock	15 August 1919	11 December 1937	18 years, 118 days	
34	(Scotland) Bill Murray	(England) Sunderland	1 April 1939	1 June 1957	18 years, 61 days	
35	(England) Charlie Paynter	(England) West Ham United	1 November 1932	1 August 1950	17 years, 273 days	
36	(Scotland) Donald Turner	(Scotland) Partick Thistle	10 August 1929	3 May 1947	17 years, 266 days	
37	(Portugal) Cosme Damião	(Portugal) Benfica	17 October 1908	28 March 1926	17 years, 162 days	
38	(Scotland) Sandy Paterson	(Scotland) Cowdenbeath	22 December 1906	24 April 1924	17 years, 124 days	
39	(Scotland) Dave Halliday	(Scotland) Aberdeen	25 December 1937	23 April 1955	17 years, 119 days	
40	(England) Will Cuff	(England) Everton	1 August 1901	31 May 1918	16 years, 303 days	
41	(England) Frank Buckley	(England) Wolverhampton Wanderers	1 July 1927	31 March 1944	16 years, 274 days	
42	(England) Alfred Jones	(England) Birmingham City	1 July 1892	31 May 1908	15 years, 335 days	
43	(Scotland) Jimmy Methven	(England) Derby County	1 August 1906	30 June 1922	15 years, 333 days	
44	(England) Thomas H. McIntosh	(England) Everton	1 August 1919	31 May 1935	15 years, 303 days	
45	(England) Harry Kent	(England) Watford	1 August 1910	31 May 1926	15 years, 303 days	
46	(England) George Jobey	(England) Derby County	1 August 1925	1 May 1941	15 years, 273 days	
47	(Scotland) Peter O'Rourke	(England) Bradford City	1 November 1905	30 June 1921	15 years, 241 days	
48	(Scotland) Willie McCartney	(Scotland) Heart of Midlothian	22 November 1919	27 April 1935	15 years, 156 days	
49	(Scotland) Jimmy Davies	(Scotland) Greenock Morton	28 October 1939	29 January 1955	15 years, 93 days	
50	(Ireland) Elisha Scott	(Ireland) Belfast Celtic	1 May 1934	30 May 1949	15 years, 29 days	
51	(Scotland) Tully Craig	(Scotland) Falkirk	27 April 1935	1 May 1950	15 years, 4 days	
52	(England) William Garbutt	(Italy) Genoa	1 January 1912	1 January 1927	15 years, 0 days	
53	(England) George Kay	(England) Liverpool	1 May 1936	28 February 1951	14 years, 303 days	
54	(Austria) Dionys Schönecker	(Austria) Rapid Wien	1 September 1910	30 June 1925	14 years, 302 days	
55	(England) Wilf Wild	(England) Manchester City	1 March 1932	1 November 1946	14 years, 245 days	
56	(England) John Haworth	(England) Burnley	31 July 1910	4 December 1924	14 years, 183 days	
57	(Ireland) Dan McMichael	(Scotland) Hibernian	20 August 1904	1 February 1919	14 years, 165 days	
58	(Scotland) Peter McWilliam	(England) Tottenham Hotspur	1 January 1913	1 February 1927	14 years, 31 days	

==== Post-1946 ====
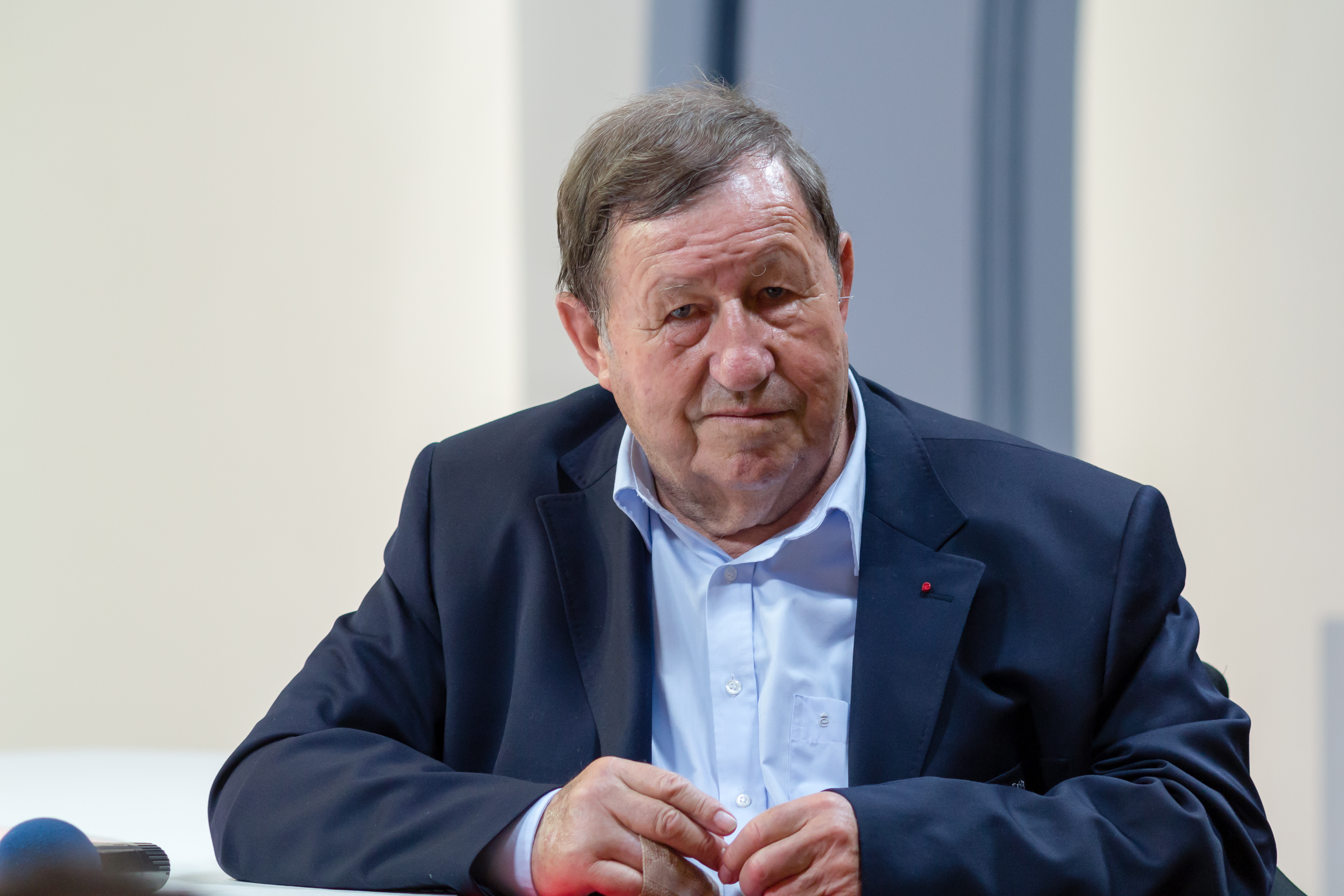
Guy Roux managed Auxerre for over 43 years in total, his longest concurrent reign being 36 years long

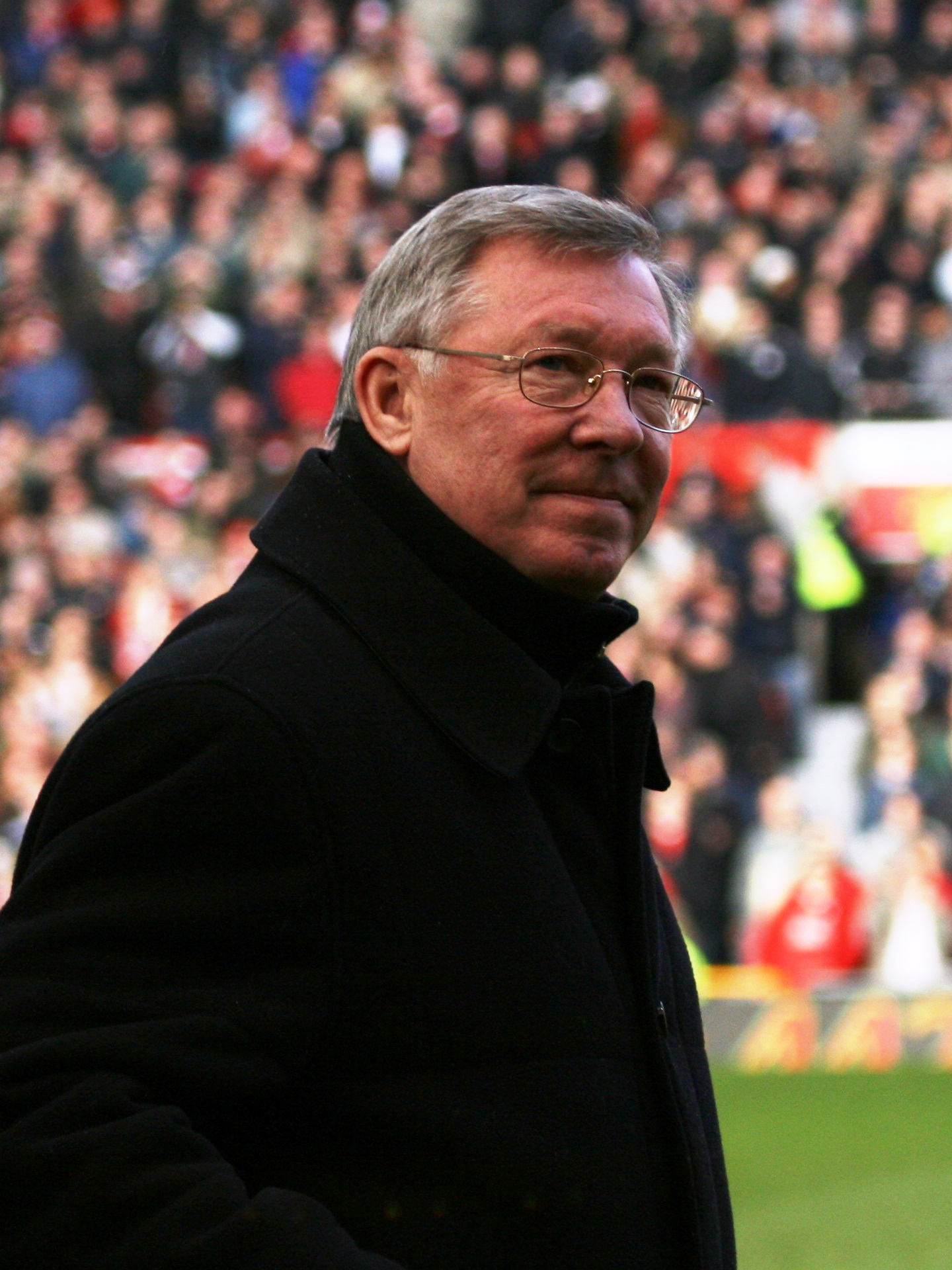
Alex Ferguson managed Manchester United for 26 years, the longest reign in post-war English top-flight football

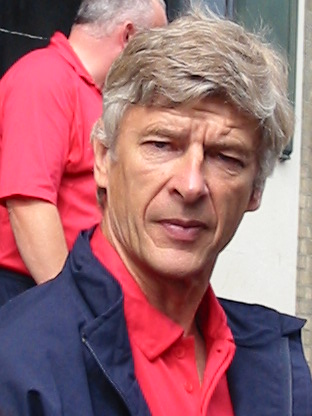
Arsène Wenger was manager of Arsenal for 22 seasons

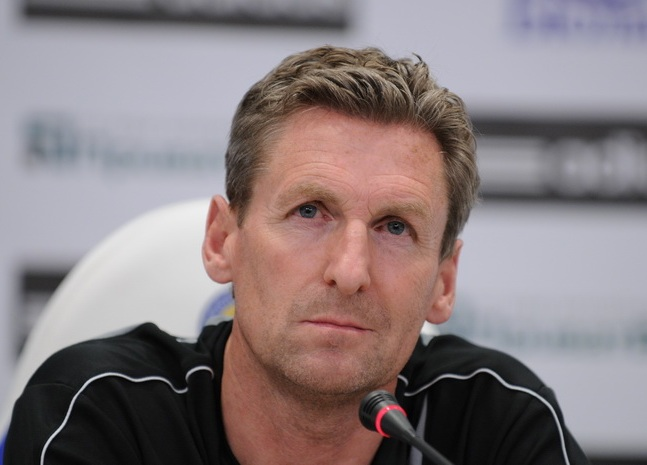
Francky Dury managed Zultse VV and their successor Zulte Waregem for a combined 28 years across three spells
Denotes incumbent manager

Longest managerial reigns (post-1946)
Rank	Manager	Club	From	To	Length	Reference
1	(Italy) Luigi Fresco	(Italy) Virtus Verona	1 July 1982	5 March 2026	43 years, 247 days	
2	(Greece) Giorgos Kyrgias	(Greece) Diogenis Larissa	1 January 1987	Present	39 years, 314 days	
3	(France) Guy Roux	(France) Auxerre	1 July 1964	30 June 2000	35 years, 365 days	
4	(England) Roly Howard	(England) Marine	12 August 1972	4 May 2005	32 years, 265 days	
5	(South Africa) Jomo Sono	(South Africa) Jomo Cosmos	1 January 1994	Present	32 years, 314 days	
6	(France) Philippe Clément	(France) Dives-Cabourg	1 July 1994	16 May 2026	31 years, 319 days	
7	(Northern Ireland) Ronnie McFall	(Northern Ireland) Portadown	1 December 1986	5 March 2016	29 years, 95 days	
8	(England) Marc White	(England) Dorking Wanderers	1 January 1999	Present	27 years, 314 days	
9	(Scotland) Alex Ferguson	(England) Manchester United	6 November 1986	19 May 2013	26 years, 194 days	
10	(England) Neil Cugley	(England) Folkestone Invicta	1 July 1997	26 August 2022	25 years, 56 days	
11	(England) Martin Ryman	(England) South Liverpool	1 August 2001	Present	25 years, 102 days	
12	(France) Michel Le Millinaire	(France) Laval	1 July 1968	27 October 1992	24 years, 118 days	
13	(England) Dave Diaper	(England) Sholing	1 July 1999	21 October 2023	24 years, 112 days	
14	(Italy) Dario Gradi	(England) Crewe Alexandra	9 June 1983	1 July 2007	24 years, 22 days	
15	(Wales) Mickey Evans	(Wales) Caersws	1 August 1983	1 June 2007	23 years, 304 days	
16	(Scotland) Matt Busby	(England) Manchester United	1 October 1945	4 June 1969	23 years, 246 days	
17	(England) Gordon Bartlett	(England) Wealdstone	1 June 1995	21 August 2017	22 years, 81 days	
18	(Saint Lucia) Stuart Charles-Fevrier	(Trinidad and Tobago) W Connection	1 July 2004	Present	22 years, 133 days	
19	(France) Arsène Wenger	(England) Arsenal	1 October 1996	13 May 2018	21 years, 224 days	
20	(Scotland) Jim McLean	(Scotland) Dundee United	6 December 1971	15 May 1993	21 years, 160 days	
21	(France) Bruno Luzi	(France) Chambly	1 July 2001	2 April 2022	20 years, 275 days	
22	(Romania) Silviu Ploeșteanu	(Romania) FC Brașov	10 July 1948	23 August 1968	20 years, 44 days	
23	(Scotland) Jimmy McGrory	(Scotland) Celtic	11 August 1945	6 March 1965	19 years, 207 days	
24	(Northern Ireland) Stephen Baxter	(Northern Ireland) Crusaders	23 February 2005	17 July 2024	19 years, 145 days	
25	(Germany) Frank Schmidt	(Germany) 1. FC Heidenheim	17 September 2007	Present	19 years, 55 days	
26	(England) Brian Clough	(England) Nottingham Forest	3 January 1975	8 May 1993	18 years, 125 days	
27	(England) Ted Bates	(England) Southampton	1 September 1955	18 November 1973	18 years, 78 days	
28	(Azerbaijan) Gurban Gurbanov	(Azerbaijan) Qarabağ	4 August 2008	Present	18 years, 99 days	
29	(Scotland) Eddie Hunter	(Scotland) Queen's Park	30 April 1979	10 December 1994	17 years, 124 days	
30	(Northern Ireland) David Jeffrey	(Northern Ireland) Linfield	4 January 1997	30 April 2014	17 years, 116 days	
31	(England) Simon Weaver	(England) Harrogate Town	20 May 2009	Present	17 years, 175 days	
32	(Scotland) Bert Henderson	(Scotland) Arbroath	6 October 1962	19 January 1980	17 years, 105 days	
33	(United States) Michael Anhaeuser	(United States) Charleston Battery	1 September 2004	1 November 2021	17 years, 61 days	
34	(Norway) Vegard Hansen	(Norway) Mjøndalen	10 October 2005	18 August 2022	16 years, 312 days	
35	(England) Bill Ridding	(England) Bolton Wanderers	1 October 1951	1 August 1968	16 years, 305 days	
36	(England) Tony Waddington	(England) Stoke City	1 June 1960	22 March 1977	16 years, 294 days	
37	(England) Eric Taylor	(England) Sheffield Wednesday	1 April 1942	31 July 1958	16 years, 121 days	
—	(Spain) Antonio Toledo	(Spain) Sporting de Huelva	1 August 2004	1 November 2020	16 years, 92 days	
38	(England) Stan Cullis	(England) Wolverhampton Wanderers	1 June 1948	1 August 1964	16 years, 61 days	
39	(Russia) Iurii Hodîchin	(Moldova) Dinamo Bender	1 January 1999	1 January 2015	16 years, 0 days	
40	(Spain) José Arribas	(France) Nantes	14 July 1960	30 June 1976	15 years, 352 days	
41	(Belgium) Francky Dury	(Belgium) Zultse VV / Zulte Waregem (Note: Retained as manager after Zultse merged with K.S.V. Waregem in 2001.)	1 July 1994	9 June 2010	15 years, 343 days	
42	(Germany) Volker Finke	(Germany) SC Freiburg	1 July 1991	27 May 2007	15 years, 330 days	
43	(England) Bill Nicholson	(England) Tottenham Hotspur	11 October 1958	29 August 1974	15 years, 322 days	
44	(United States) Peter Vermes	(United States) Sporting Kansas City	4 August 2009	31 March 2025	15 years, 239 days	
45	(Scotland) Bert Herdman	(Scotland) Raith Rovers	23 February 1946	14 October 1961	15 years, 233 days	
46	(Scotland) Tommy Walker	(Scotland) Heart of Midlothian	17 February 1951	24 September 1966	15 years, 219 days	
47	(England) John Rudge	(England) Port Vale	5 December 1983	18 January 1999	15 years, 44 days	
48	(Argentina) Pablo Vicó	(Argentina) Club Atlético Brown	21 March 2009	3 May 2024	15 years, 43 days	
49	(Scotland) Jimmy McKinnell Jr.	(Scotland) Queen of the South	20 April 1946	29 April 1961	15 years, 9 days	
50	(Netherlands) Eugène Gerards	(Greece) OFI	1 July 1985	30 June 2000	14 years, 365 days	
51	(England) John Lyall	(England) West Ham United	16 August 1974	5 June 1989	14 years, 293 days	
52	(Argentina) Diego Simeone	(Spain) Atlético Madrid	23 November 2011	Present	14 years, 353 days	
53	(Scotland) Bill Shankly	(England) Liverpool	14 December 1959	12 July 1974	14 years, 210 days	
54	(England) Jason Ainsley	(England) Spennymoor Town	1 July 2006	11 December 2020	14 years, 163 days	
55	(Northern Ireland) Roy Coyle	(Northern Ireland) Linfield	22 November 1975	30 April 1990	14 years, 159 days	
56	(Germany) Otto Rehhagel	(Germany) Werder Bremen	2 April 1981	30 June 1995	14 years, 89 days	
57	(Scotland) Douglas Samuel	(Scotland) The Spartans	1 July 2012	Present	14 years, 133 days	
58	(Germany) Thomas Schaaf	(Germany) Werder Bremen	10 May 1999	18 May 2013	14 years, 8 days	
59	(Scotland) Hugh Shaw	(Scotland) Hibernian	31 January 1948	4 November 1961	13 years, 277 days	
60	(Spain) Miguel Muñoz	(Spain) Real Madrid	17 April 1960	15 January 1974	13 years, 273 days	
61	(England) Graham Turner	(England) Hereford United	1 August 1995	24 April 2009	13 years, 266 days	

=== National teams ===
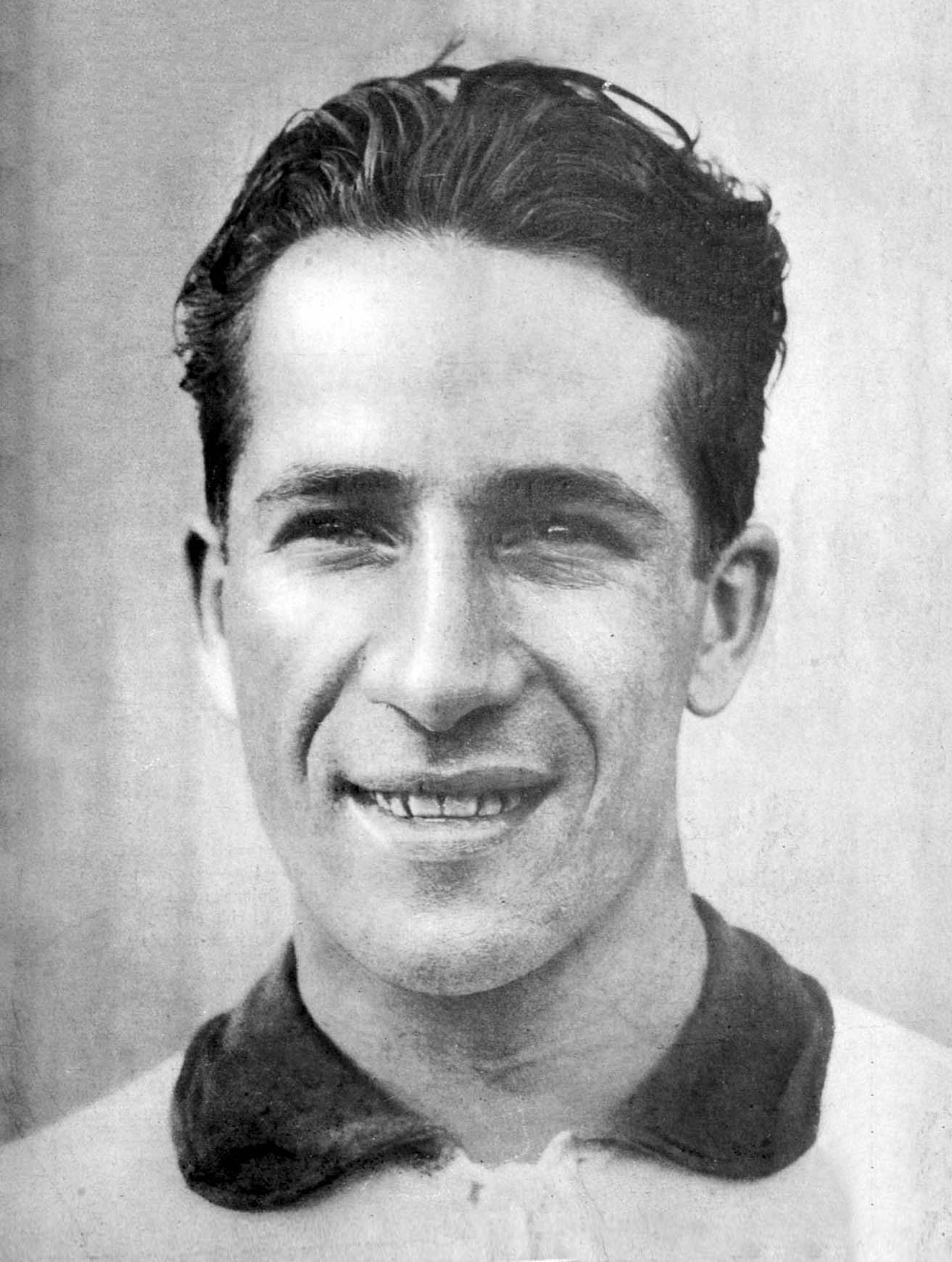
Guillermo Stábile managed Argentina for almost 19 years, the longest reign in international football

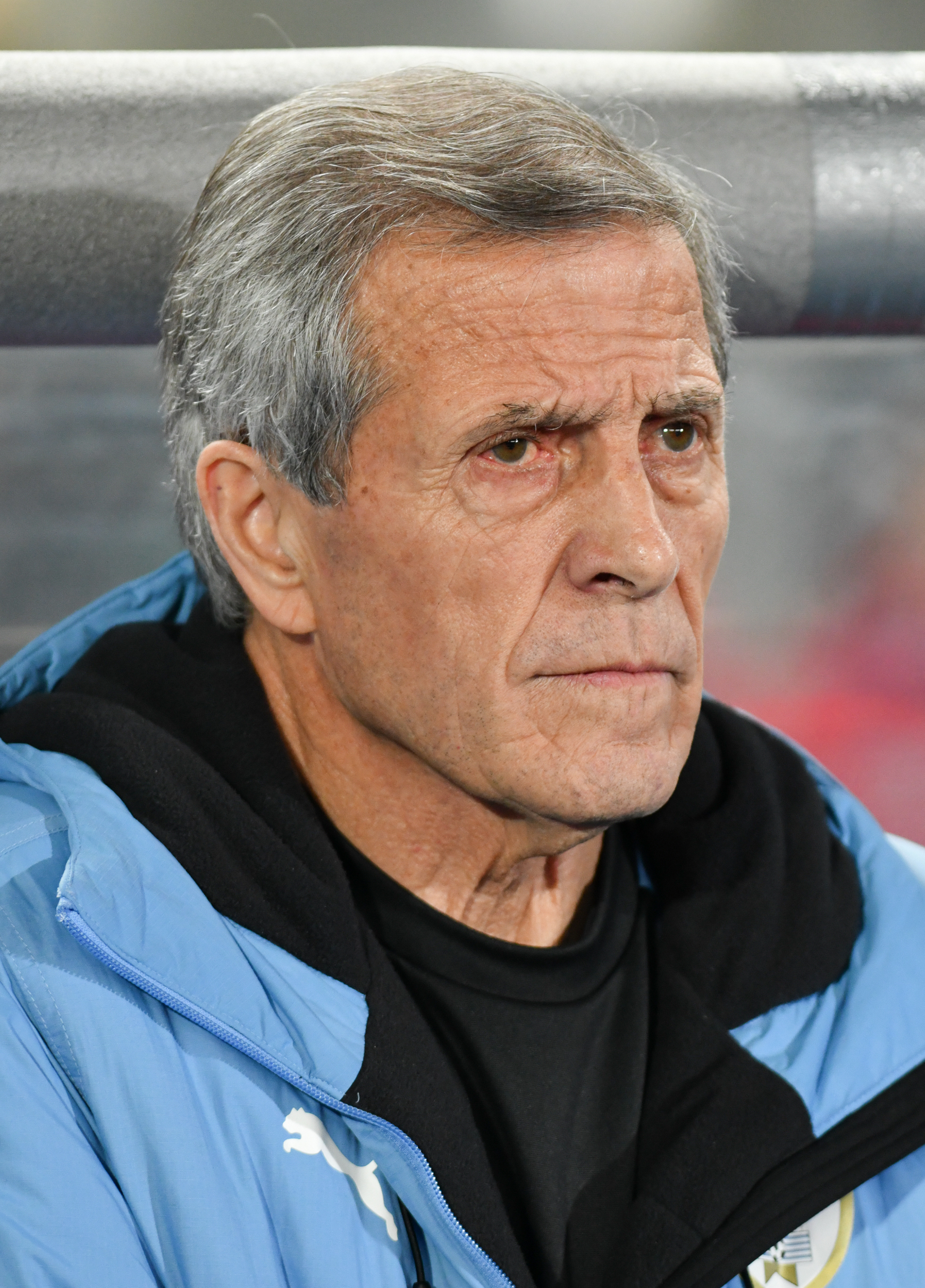
Oscar Tabárez was Uruguay manager for 16 years, the longest streak in the 21st century

Denotes incumbent manager

Longest managerial reigns in international football
Rank	Manager	National team	From	To	Length	Reference
—	(Spain) Ignacio Quereda	Spain women	1 January 1988	30 July 2015	27 years, 210 days	
1	(Argentina) Guillermo Stábile	Argentina	13 August 1939	15 June 1958	18 years, 306 days	
2	(Italy) Vittorio Pozzo	Italy	1 December 1929	5 August 1948	18 years, 248 days	
3	(Mauritius) Mohammad Anwar Elahee	Mauritius	1 January 1970	1 January 1988	18 years, 0 days	
4	(Austria) Hugo Meisl	Austria	5 October 1919 (Note: Prior to this, joint manager from October 1914 along with Heinrich Retschury.)	17 February 1937	17 years, 135 days	
5	(Andorra) Koldo Álvarez	Andorra	2 February 2010	Present	16 years, 282 days	
6	(Luxembourg) Paul Philipp	Luxembourg	21 March 1985	10 June 2001	16 years, 81 days	
7	(England) Walter Winterbottom	England	28 September 1946	21 November 1962	16 years, 54 days	
8	(Uruguay) Óscar Tabárez	Uruguay	7 March 2006	19 November 2021	15 years, 257 days	
9	(Sweden) John Pettersson	Sweden	26 March 1921	27 September 1936	15 years, 185 days	
10	(France) Gaston Barreau	France	7 December 1930	19 May 1946	15 years, 163 days	(Note: Gaston Barreau served as the head of the French selection committee for 25 years, from 1920 to 1946, but he was not the coach of France during the 1930 FIFA World Cup.)
11	(Denmark) Morten Olsen	Denmark	1 July 2000	17 November 2015	15 years, 139 days	
—	(England) Hope Powell	England women	21 April 1998	20 August 2013	15 years, 121 days	
12	(England) Bob Glendenning	Netherlands	15 March 1925	21 April 1940	15 years, 37 days	
—	(Ivory Coast) Clémentine Touré	Ivory Coast women	1 January 2010	31 January 2025	15 years, 30 days	
13	(Luxembourg) Luc Holtz	Luxembourg	4 August 2010	11 August 2025	15 years, 7 days	
14	(San Marino) Giampaolo Mazza	San Marino	10 October 1998	15 October 2013	15 years, 5 days	
15	(Luxembourg) Paul Feierstein	Luxembourg	4 June 1933	24 May 1948	14 years, 355 days	
16	(Germany) Joachim Löw	Germany	12 July 2006	29 June 2021	14 years, 352 days	
17	(France) Didier Deschamps	France	8 July 2012	31 July 2026	14 years, 23 days	
—	(Belgium) Ives Serneels	Belgium women	1 March 2011	17 January 2025	13 years, 322 days	
18	(Northern Ireland) Billy Bingham	Northern Ireland	26 March 1980	17 November 1993	13 years, 236 days	
19	(West Germany) Helmut Schön	West Germany	4 November 1964	21 June 1978	13 years, 229 days	
20	(West Germany) Sepp Herberger	West Germany	22 November 1950	7 June 1964	13 years, 198 days	
21	(Belgium) Guy Thys	Belgium	22 May 1976	8 June 1989	13 years, 17 days	
22	(Finland) Olavi Laaksonen	Finland	19 June 1962	9 October 1974	12 years, 112 days	
23	(Germany) Helmut Kosmehl	Mauritius	1 January 1976	1 January 1988	12 years, 0 days	
24	(Republic of Ireland) Johnny Carey	Republic of Ireland	19 October 1955	22 February 1967	11 years, 126 days	
—	(Germany) Silvia Neid	Germany women	20 June 2005	20 August 2016	11 years, 61 days	
25	(England) Alf Ramsey	England	27 February 1963	3 April 1974	11 years, 35 days	
26	(East Germany) Georg Buschner	East Germany	1 May 1970	31 May 1981	11 years, 30 days	
—	(England) Martin Reagan	England women	1 January 1979	1 January 1990	11 years, 0 days	
27	(Mongolia) Ishdorjiin Otgonbayar	Mongolia	1 January 2000	1 December 2010	10 years, 334 days	
28	(Spain) David Rodrigo	Andorra	1 May 1999	1 February 2010	10 years, 276 days	
29	(West Germany) Sepp Piontek	Denmark	1 July 1979	1 April 1990	10 years, 274 days	
30	(Italy) Enzo Bearzot	Italy	27 September 1975	17 June 1986	10 years, 263 days	
31	(Northern Ireland) Peter Doherty	Northern Ireland	6 October 1951	9 May 1962	10 years, 215 days	
32	(France) Gaston Barreau	France	18 January 1920	25 May 1930	10 years, 127 days	
33	(France) Roger Salnot	Guadeloupe	28 March 2001	16 June 2011	10 years, 80 days	

== See also ==
- List of football managers with most games
