= Liverpool County Football Association =

Regional football authority in Liverpool, England

Coordinates: 53.4460°N 2.9539°W

- Formation: 1892
- Purpose: Football association
- Headquarters: LCFA Sefton
- Location: Liverpool L23 9YP
- County Secretary: D Pugh
- Website: liverpoolfa.com

The Liverpool County Football Association, simply known as the Liverpool FA, is the County Football Association in the city of Liverpool, England. It runs several league and cup competitions in the city.

== Organisation ==
The aim of the Liverpool County Football Association Ltd (LCFA), is to establish for the benefit of all concerned within Football, the appropriate structures and systems to enable the Association to control, manage, regulate and promote the game within the area. This will enable us to assist with the development of the game, to increase the quality and quantity of participation across the various sections. The LCFA Sefton site is operated by the LCFA and boasts high-quality outdoor pitches and five 5-a-side pitches, with a full-size 3G pitch to open by January 2022.

Specific Objectives of LCFA are:

• To govern and administer all aspects of football within the County boundary • To proactively introduce the initiatives of the Football Association to all bodies of football within the County boundary • To actively encourage people to participate and develop their individual skills, through their participation in football

== Affiliated leagues ==
There are a large number of leagues covering the Merseyside and Cheshire areas, many of which are affiliated to the Liverpool County FA but some are affiliated to the Cheshire County FA or Lancashire County FA.

=== Men's Saturday leagues ===
- Liverpool County Premier League
- Liverpool Old Boys Amateur League
- Southport and District Amateur League
- Warrington & District Football League
- Zingari Football Combination League

=== Men's Sunday leagues ===
- Birkenhead Sunday League
- Crosby and District Sunday League
- Ellesmere Port Senior Sunday League
- Formers League – Sunday Competition
- Liverpool Business Houses Football League – Sunday Competition
- Ormskirk and District Sunday League
- Skelmersdale and District Sunday League
- Southport and District League – Sunday Competition
- Wallasey and District Sunday League
- Wirral Sunday League

=== Other leagues ===
- Merseyside Ability Counts League
- Merseyside Christian League

=== Youth leagues ===
- Anfield Junior Summer League
- Belle Vale and District Junior League
- Bootle, Litherland and Netherton Junior League
- Craven Minor League
- Eastham and District Junior League
- Edge Hill Junior League
- Ellesmere Port Junior League
- Halewood Summer Junior League
- Halton and District Junior League
- Hightown Junior League
- Kirkby Summer Junior League
- Kirkby Youth and Junior League
- Liverpool and District Junior Summer Soccer League
- Merseyside and Halewood Junior League
- Scotland Road and District Junior League
- St Helens and Rainhill Junior Alliance League
- South Liverpool and District Junior League
- Springfield Junior League
- Skelmersdale Junior League
- Alice Petricca Junior League
- Tuebrook Junior Sports League
- Wallasey Junior League
- Walton and Kirkdale Junior League
- Warrington Junior League
- West Derby Junior League
- Wigan and District Youth League

=== Ladies and girls leagues ===
- LCFA Women's League
- LCFA Girls League
- West Lancs Girl's League

=== Small-sided leagues ===
- Newton-le-Willows 7 a side Leagues, Keep Football Alive Leagues
- Litherland 7 a side Tuesday Evening League, Keep Football Alive Leagues
- Bootle 5 a side Tuesday Evening League, Keep Football Alive Leagues
- Liverpool Soccer Sixes Wednesday League
- St Helens Thursday 6 A Side League
- Southport Tuesday 6 A Side League
- Toxteth 5 a side Tuesday Evening League, Keep Football Alive Leagues
- Walton 7 a side Summer League

Halewood 7 a side Sunday League, Keep Football Alive Leagues

- Warrington Monday 6 A Side League

=== Futsal leagues ===
- LCFA Men's Futsal League
- LCFA Women's Futsal League

== Disbanded or amalgamated leagues ==
A number of leagues that were affiliated to the Liverpool County FA have disbanded or amalgamated with other leagues including:

- Liverpool and District Sunday League (merged 2020 with Liverpool Business Houses Football League)
- Liverpool County Combination
- I Zingari League
- St Helens Combination
- Birkenhead and Wirral League
- Liverpool Shipping League
- Liverpool and District CMS League
- Halewood Junior League
- Merseyside Junior Winter League
- Rainhill and District Junior League

== Affiliated member clubs ==
Among the notable clubs that are (or have been) affiliated to the Liverpool County FA are:

- AFC Liverpool
- Bootle
- Burscough
- Cammell Laird
- City of Liverpool
- Everton
- Formby (now defunct)
- Knowsley United (now defunct)
- Liverpool
- Maghull
- Marine
- New Brighton (now defunct)
- Prescot Cables
- Skelmersdale United
- Southport
- South Liverpool
- St Helens Town
- Tranmere Rovers
- Warrington Rylands 1906

== Competitions ==
=== Leagues ===
Competition	Holders
Liverpool County Premier League Premier Division	Aigburth Peoples Hall
Liverpool County Premier League Division One	Old Xaverians Reserves
Liverpool County Premier League Division Two	BRNESC Reserves
Liverpool County Premier League Division Three	Custys
Liverpool County Youth Division (U21 Sunday)	Custys U21
Liverpool County Youth Division (U18 Saturday)	Waterloo Dock U18
Liverpool County Youth Division (U18 Sunday)	Canada FC
Liverpool County Women's League	Tranmere Rovers Ladies
Liverpool County Men's Futsal League	Dengo United
Liverpool County Women's Futsal League	Brazil Girls

=== Adult cups ===
Competition	Holders
Liverpool Senior Cup	Marine
Liverpool Women's Senior Cup	MSB Woolton First Ladies
Liverpool Challenge Cup	South Liverpool
Liverpool Sunday Premier Cup	Mayfair
Liverpool Saturday Junior Cup	Netherley Woodlane Legion
Liverpool Sunday Junior Cup	S.O.G FC.
Liverpool Saturday Intermediate Cup	Rainhill Town
Liverpool Sunday Intermediate Cup	Knowsley South
Liverpool Veteran's Cup	Britannia Veterans VNC

=== Youth cups ===
Competition	Holders
Liverpool Youth Cup (Under-18)	Churchtown Athletic
Liverpool Under-16 Boys Cup	Maghull Youth
Liverpool Under-16 Girls Cup	Tranmere Rovers
Liverpool Under-13 Boys Cup	Blackbrook
Liverpool Inter League U18 Cup	St Helens Comb
Liverpool Inter League U16 Cup	Bootle & Netherton
Liverpool Inter League U14 Cup	South Liverpool
Liverpool Inter League U12 Cup	South Liverpool
