= Leighton McGivern =

English footballer (born 1984)

Personal information
- Full name: Leighton Terence McGivern-Henshaw
- Date of birth: 2 June 1984 (age 42)
- Place of birth: Liverpool, England
- Position: Striker

Youth career
- Everton

Senior career*
Years	Team	Apps	(Gls)
2002–2003	Aberystwyth Town	10	(3)
2003	Kidsgrove Athletic		
2003–2004	Waterloo Dock	?	(35)
2004	Vauxhall Motors	1	(1)
2004–2005	Rochdale	25	(1)
2005–2006	Vauxhall Motors	14	(3)
2006–2008	Accrington Stanley	19	(2)
2008–2010	Waterloo Dock	25	(42)
2011–2012	Vauxhall Motors		
2012	Altrincham	9	(4)
2021–2022	Lower Breck	16	(7)
- * Club domestic league appearances and goals as of 13:44, 13 February 2022 (UTC)

Leighton Terence McGivern-Henshaw (born 2 June 1984) is a semi-professional footballer who played as a striker. He notably played in the Football League with Rochdale and Accrington Stanley.

== Club career ==
After playing for Everton as a trainee, McGivern signed for Welsh club Aberystwyth Town in the inaugural season of the League of Wales. In July 2003 he joined Kidsgrove Athletic. He then joined Liverpool Combination side Waterloo Dock where he scored 42 goals for the club in only 25 matches in the league and Liverpool County FA Challenge Cup. At the same time he played with Britannia in the Liverpool Sunday League.

Next he joined Vauxhall Motors, where he scored once in his only appearance for the club, before moving to Rochdale where he made twenty-five Football League appearances. He left the club in May 2005.

A return to Vauxhall in August 2005 was followed by a time on trial with Chester City in October 2006. He then had second spell as a full-time professional player, this time with Accrington Stanley who he joined in November 2006. The following month he was ruled out for 4 months after breaking a bone in his ankle. He was released by the club, along with ten teammates in May 2008.

In April 2009, he was charged by the Football Association, in relation to his alleged failure to provide the FA with information requested, during their investigation into illegal betting by his former Accrington teammates on one of their matches.

He then dropped down a significant number of divisions, playing again for Liverpool-based side Waterloo Dock for two seasons, scoring at least 40 goals in the first season.

He returned to play for Vauxhall Motors in January 2011 scoring on his debut at home to Corby Town

He was also playing for Oysters Martyrs FC and scored the winning goal in the FA Sunday Cup final as his team beat fellow Liverpool side Paddock FC at Tranmere Rovers' Prenton Park in May 2011.

In 2011, he went on trial at Stockport County and scored in a friendly against New Mills. He was offered a contract by the club but re-signed for Vauxhall.

He left Vauxhall for a third time at the end of February 2012.

He joined Altrincham in March 2012. He scored a hat-trick against Eastwood Town on 21 April. He was told by the club that he would be offered new terms for the 2012/13 season but was released in late July when after his failure to turn up to any of the pre-season training sessions or to reply to any of the messages left for him by the club on his telephone.

In September 2012, he was back playing Sunday League football in Liverpool for Oysters Martyrs FC, where that season he again helped the club win the FA Sunday Cup, scoring a hat-trick as the club beat Barnes Albion 4–3.

In October 2021, after almost a decade away from senior football, McGivern joined Lower Breck in the North West Counties Football League, making his debut against Skelmersdale United. He retired in February 2022, having scored 7 goals in 16 games for the club. He scored in his final appearance, a 4–4 draw against Charnock Richard.

== Honours ==
- Liverpool County Combination: Winner's medal with Waterloo Dock – 2003–04
- Liverpool County FA Challenge Cup: Winner's medal with Waterloo Dock – 2003–04
- Liverpool County Premier League: Winner's medals with Waterloo Dock – 2008–09 and 2009–10
- FA Sunday Cup: Winner's medals with Oysters Martyrs FC – 2010–11 and 2012–13
