= LCFC =

LCFC can stand for:

- Lancaster City F.C., an English football club
- Leicester City F.C., an English football club
- Lichfield City F.C., an English football club
- Lincoln City F.C., an English football club
- Little Common F.C., an English football club
- Liverpool County Football Combination, an English football league
- Londonderry City F.C., a Northern Irish football club
- London Caledonians F.C., a former English football club
- London Colney F.C., an English football club
- Louisville City FC, an American professional soccer club
- Lowest Common Factorial of Crime, a modern form of mathematical, criminal justice
- Lurgan Celtic F.C., a Northern Irish football club
