= South Liverpool F.C. =

English football club

Coordinates: 53°22′04.12″N 2°56′19.71″W

- Full name: South Liverpool Football Club
- Nickname: The South
- Founded: 1935; 1991 (re-founded)
- Ground: Jericho Lane; Aigburth, Liverpool, England
- Chairman: Gary Langley
- Manager: Martin Ryman
- League: North West Counties League Premier Division
- 2025–26: North West Counties League Premier Division, 16th of 24
- Website: https://www.southliverpoolfc.com/
Home colours

South Liverpool Football Club is a football club based in Aigburth, Liverpool, England, founded as a phoenix club of a club of the same name. It is currently a member of the North West Counties League Premier Division; the team plays at Jericho Lane in the Otterspool area of Aigburth. The club's colours are white shirts, black shorts, and red socks.

The First Team play on the Stadium Pitch at the Jericho Lane Sports Hub, which is where the First Team are affiliated. The Reserves and Third Teams also play on this pitch intermittently but also use the second pitch or its home of many years, The North Field, on Jericho Lane, which the club still operates.

The club has around 35 teams under its South Liverpool FC Banner, ranging from Open Age through to Vets Teams, Reserves Youth Teams and Juniors. It has close ties with Liverpool Feds FC, whom they work closely with to develop women and girls players.

A large number of the club's committee have been with the club for many years, and the club remains very familiar to those who have played for it. The club's chairman is Gary Langley, who is also a director of the North West Counties League.

The club has an active supporters club which works closely with the football club to generate awareness and funds for club operations. It is considered one of the largest supporters clubs in the NWCFL.

“The Fanzine with no name” is a candidate for the longest continuously running fanzine in non-league.

== History ==
=== Predecessor ===
It has long been accepted that the first South Liverpool FC was founded in the late 1890s when a club called African Royal (or, in some sources, Africa Royal) changed its name, under the influence of W.J. Sawyer, and relocated to Dingle, just south of the city centre.

The club relocated and became New Brighton A.F.C. in 1921.

=== Foundation and early years ===
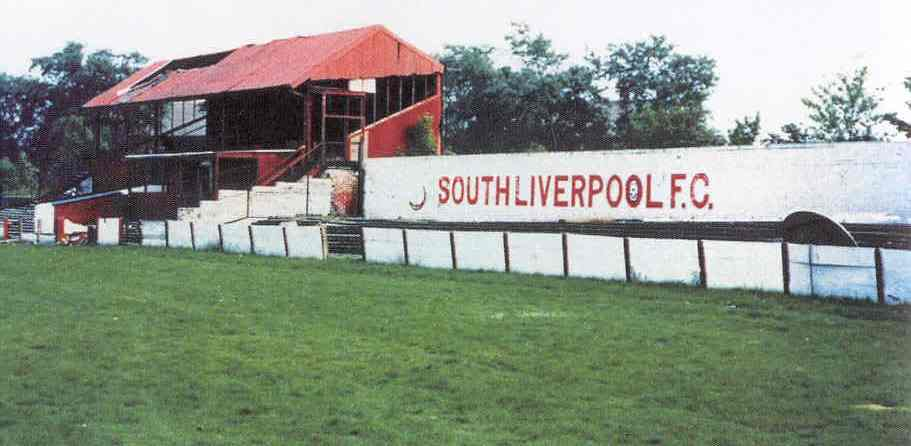
Holly Park, Garston

The second South Liverpool FC was formed in 1935, playing at Holly Park, Garston. The club joined the Lancashire Combination with immediate impact, winning it three years running, in 1937, 1938 and 1939. Given that the original 1890s South Liverpool continued playing until 1983 under the name of New Brighton AFC, the second South Liverpool had no connection other than the same name. Indeed, South Liverpool played New Brighton reserves on a number of occasions in the Lancashire Combination and New Brighton's first team in the Liverpool Senior Cup.

During the 1930s, South Liverpool applied regularly for election to the Football League. The idea was to have another leading club in the Liverpool area. Even in 1939, however, after South Liverpool won four trophies, the club only attracted 5 votes at the Football League AGM election – way behind the two re-elected Third Division North clubs, Accrington Stanley (29) and Hartlepools (38). Incidentally, even farther behind South Liverpool in that election were Wigan Athletic, who garnered zero votes. In all, South Liverpool applied to join the Football League on ten occasions, always without success.

The club was more successful in the Welsh Cup, and they won it at their first attempt, in 1939, defeating Cardiff City 2–1 in the final. "Many thousands were in the ground when we went back to Holly Park at two o'clock in the morning," Jack Roscoe said in 1989 about the aftermath of the 1939 Welsh Cup final victory. "We couldn't believe it. We were expecting the streets to be deserted but in the end we couldn't even get into the ground ourselves."

After World War II started, the club joined the Western Section of the Cheshire County League and one season was played before war stopped the game.

=== Post-War Golden Era ===
After the war, the club remained in the Cheshire County League until 1951, when they rejoined the Lancashire Combination, going into the Second Division. In September 1949, Holly Park hosted the first match in the UK to be played under "permanent" floodlights, a friendly against a Nigerian XI (the first Nigerian side to tour the UK). The match was covered for BBC Overseas Service (now World Service) by Kenneth Wolstenholme, who would later earn fame for his commentary on the World Cup final of 1966. The final score was 2–2, with the official attendance 13,007. It was said that one of the remarkable things about this game was that the Nigerian team played in bare feet, although the writer of has no proof other than an anecdotal story that was told to him as a child.

After a season in the second division of the Lancashire Combination, South Liverpool were promoted to the first division at the first attempt, but were relegated back to the second division in 1960 after finishing bottom. South Liverpool gained promotion in 1962 and won the Lancashire Combination first division championship in 1966.

The club had also been relatively successful in the FA Cup, reaching the first round eight times and the second round twice, though the only time they achieved a "giant-killing" feat was when they beat Halifax Town in 1964–65.

In 1967, the 40-year-old Hungarian-born football legend Ferenc Puskás guested for the club in a fundraising friendly match at Holly Park which attracted a sell-out crowd of 10,000. His side faced one led by Billy Liddell, who had John Charles in his team, while Malcolm Allison, Billy Bingham, and Dave Hickson also featured.

As one of the more successful non-League clubs in northern England, South Liverpool were invited to join the newly formed Northern Premier League in 1968. Notable players during the club's first ten years in the NPL were Jimmy Case and later John Aldridge, who both went on to achieve fame with Liverpool, Joe Hinnigan who became a stalwart at Sunderland, and Peter Houghton who moved on to Wigan Athletic and Preston North End. John Aldridge wrote about his South Liverpool career in his autobiography: "It was autumn 1978 before I won a regular place in the South Liverpool first team and the turn of the year before I started to score regularly. At the beginning of the season, the club’s official pen-pictures described me as 'a local youngster who shows great potential with his flair for attack'. By the middle of the season, the pen-pictures described me as 'an exciting goalscorer'. It was exciting to be regarded as 'exciting'."

Before the 1987–88 season South Liverpool became the first non-league team to offer a Youth Training Scheme to players. Only professional clubs did this at that time. There were approximately 8 players who were involved with this.

=== Financial difficulty and re-establishment ===
At the end of the 1987–88 season the reserve team and youth team were scrapped due to financial reasons. The profitable clubhouse was also burnt down and funds were very tight.

The club remained in the NPL until financial problems forced the limited company, South Liverpool Athletic & Association Football Club Co. Ltd., to fold after the 1990–91 season. A committee formed itself in the summer of 1991 and took over the name "South Liverpool A.F.C."

The club committee carried on the club from the defunct limited company in 1991–92 with only a junior team operating in the West Derby Junior league. For 1992–93 the senior side merged with local side Cheshire Lines whilst the junior team carried on under the club's own name. The new team, Cheshire Lines South Liverpool, played in the Second Division of the Liverpool County Combination, gaining promotion in their first season. After a successful first season in the First Division, the clubs took the decision to split.

Back under its own sole name South Liverpool although having been the football club had to join the Second Division of the Liverpool County Combination in 1995 and gained promotion at the first attempt. Until the end of the 2005–06 season, the club remained in the County Combination. Winning the Liverpool Junior Cup in 1997 and the George Mahon league Cup in 2002.

=== 21st Century ===
Their highest league placing being 4th in 2005. In the summer of 2006, the County Combination merged with the I Zingari League to create the Liverpool County Premier League. Due to their low finish in 2005–06 (11th), the club was placed in Division One.

In 2006, the site of Holly Park had been redeveloped and was opened as Liverpool South Parkway railway station.

During their time in amateur football the goalscoring record of Jack Roscoe (1935–39) was beaten by Keith Jones scoring 236 goals (1992–2006) and keeper Stephen Ward with 143 clean sheets (1995–2016) eclipsed South legend Peter Eales 74 (1966–1989).

South also had a reserve team in the I Zingari Combination having won the third division in 2005 and the second division title in 2006. In 2007–08 South's youth team (under 18-s) played in the West Cheshire League, finishing 2nd in their first season and 3rd in 2008–09 and winning the West Cheshire Youth Plate. In 2009–10 South's youth team finished first in the West Cheshire League under captain Ellis Jones

South won the George Mahon Cup at Goodison Park in 2009 and in 2011 beat Waterloo Dock to lift the I Zingari Cup. 2011 saw South move to the West Cheshire League and in accordance with league rules joined the third division. They won the league and recorded a win in every league away game. The second division championship followed in 2012–13, with South maintaining an unbeaten away record in the league. South reserves joined the West Cheshire third division in 2012–13 with the club's Under 18s securing the West Cheshire Youth Division title.

2011 saw the club expand its number of teams into a youth section under the guidance of Mark Eyres with a number of youth teams ranging from 7 to 16 and playing in local junior Leagues such as the Belle Vale Junior League based at Caldway Drive in Netherley.

The 2013–14 season saw the club take on board South Liverpool Ladies who play in the Liverpool County FA Women's League playing home games at The North Field.

South won the West Cheshire League Division One title in 2014–15 with its youth team recording a treble success of West Cheshire League title, West Cheshire Youth Plate and Liverpool County FA Youth Cup (last won in 1974). The first team then retained the First Division Championship in 2015–16. This would be the club's best season since the drop from semi professional status as the club also won the West Cheshire Division One League Cup – known as the Pyke Cup, and the Liverpool County FA Challenge Cup (last won by the club in 1967).

Manager Martin Ryman has been at the helm since August 2001 making him the longest serving manager in the club's history.

South's home ground since 2000 is The North Field, Jericho Lane Otterspool, Liverpool (L17 5AR), The ground is railed off but has no covered accommodation. The club produce programmes for all first and reserve games along with some youth games. entered the FA Vase for the first time in 2021–22.

== Staff ==
- Club Chairman: Gary Langley
- Life President: John Whittingham
- Vice President: Colin Robinson
- Hon Club Secretary: Jim Stanway
- Club Treasurer: Malcolm Flanagan
- Manager: (England) Martin Ryman
- Assistant manager: (England) Stephen Ward
- Reserve Team Manager: Barry Roach
- Youth Team Co-Ordinator: Brad Harkness
- Club Mascot: Jack Mather

== Squad ==
- Mohamed Abdi
- Lucas Allan (GK)
- James Allen
- Jack Bennett
- Josh Ryman
- Oscar Billington
- Ali Birmingham
- Chris Bramell
- Josh Bridge
- James Carr
- James Cottrell
- Kevin Cringle
- Cameron Dalton
- Anthony Davies
- James Davies
- Steve Leonard Doyle
- Harry Farley
- Lucas Garbe
- Cameron Glennon
- Louis Gorman
- Alex Griffiths - (Club Captain)
- Owen Hough
- Steve Kelly
- Matthew Kewn
- Tom Kinsella
- Andy Lloyd
- Kevin Martin
- Tyler Magee
- Jacob McCoy (GK)
- Darryl Mvalo
- Mason Nevitt
- Phil Ojapah
- Chukwuka Okereafor
- Elliot Owen
- Kian Skinley
- Francis Turkington
- Ethan Van-Aston
- James Webb
- Peter Webster (GK)
- David Welsh
- Christopher Wilkinson
- Bradley Williams

== Records ==
- Best FA Cup performance: Second round, 1936–37, 1937–38 (replay), 1946–47
- Best FA Trophy performance: Second round, 1971–72, 1972–73, 1974–75 (replay)
- Best FA Vase performance: Fourth round, 2023–24, 2025–26
- Best Welsh Cup performance: Champions, 1938–39

== Honours ==
- Welsh Cup Winners: 1939
- Lancashire Combination Champions: 1937, 1938, 1939, 1966
- Lancashire Combination Division 2 Champions: 1913
- Lancashire FA Challenge Trophy Winners: 1937, 1938, 1939, 1984
- Northern Premier League Challenge Cup Winners: 1984
- Northern Premier League President's Cup Winners: 1988
- North West Counties Football League Division One North Champions: 2023–24
- West Cheshire League Division 3 Champions: 2011–12
- West Cheshire League Division 2 Champions: 2012–13
- West Cheshire League Division 1 Champions: 2014–15, 2015–16, 2017–18, 2020–21

== Former players ==
1. Players that have played/managed in the Football League or any foreign equivalent to this level (i.e. fully professional league).
2. Players with full international caps.
3. Players that hold a club record.

- (England) John Fielding
- (England) Alex Finney
- (England) Jimmy Case
- (Republic of Ireland) John Aldridge
- (England) Peter Billing
- (England) Harold Houghton
- (Australia) Jim Tansey
