= Harold Houghton =

English footballer

Personal information
- Date of birth: 26 August 1906
- Place of birth: Liverpool, England
- Date of death: 3 February 1986 (aged 79)
- Place of death: Liverpool, England
- Position: Inside forward

Youth career
- Anfield Social Club

Senior career*
Years	Team	Apps	(Gls)
1922–1928	Everton	1	(0)
1928–1934	Exeter City	207	(79)
1934–1935	Norwich City	52	(10)
1935–1937	Bristol Rovers	62	(23)
1937–????	South Liverpool		
- * Club domestic league appearances and goals

Harold Houghton (26 August 1906 – 3 February 1986) was an English professional footballer, who played as an inside forward for four teams in the Football League, amassing 322 appearances and scoring 112 goals between 1927 and 1937.

Having played as a child for Anfield Social Club, he joined Everton in January 1922, while still aged 15. He turned professional with them in December 1923, aged 17, but he would have to wait until 1927 before he finally made his only first team appearance. He joined Exeter City for a fee of £350 in June 1928, and went on to make 207 League appearances and score 79 goals in just under six years with them.

Norwich City paid £550 to sign Houghton in March 1934, and he moved to Bristol Rovers on 1 November 1935. While at Rovers he was the club's top goalscorer during the 1936–37 season with 14 goals. He returned to his home city in 1937, where he played for South Liverpool.
