= Roly Howard =

English football manager (1935–2025)

Managerial roles
- 1972–2005: Marine

Personal details
- Born: Roland J. Howard; 10 April 1935 Ormskirk, Lancashire, England
- Died: 21 November 2025 (aged 90)

Roland J. Howard (10 April 1935 – 21 November 2025) was an English football manager. He has been recognised by Guinness World Records as the longest serving senior club football manager in the world for his management of Merseyside club Marine for 33 years between 1972 and 2005.

== Career ==
Roland J. Howard was born in Ormskirk, Lancashire on 10 April 1935. Once a footballer, Howard had been reserve team manager for Marine and was appointed first-team manager of the Crosby based club at the start of the 1972–73 season. His first match in charge was on 12 August 1972, a 2–2 draw against Stalybridge Celtic and he was in charge for 1,975 matches, with his final match being the 2004–05 Liverpool Senior Cup final against Everton on 4 May 2005.

He initially combined the roles of groundsman and manager for his first seven years managing the club. In his time with Marine, he guided them to five league titles, fifteen county and league cup wins, the FA Trophy semi-finals and once into the third round of the FA Cup.

Howard also managed the Northern Premier League representative side for sixteen years.

In his retirement year, a Merseyside Legends team which included John Aldridge, David Fairclough, Michael Thomas, Gary Ablett and Mark Lawrenson played in his testimonial match against a variety of Marine players from Howard's 33 years in charge.

In 2012, he was awarded the League Merit Award by the Northern Premier League in recognition of his service to the club and league.

Fellow Merseyside manager Jimmy Davies who set up Waterloo Dock and managed them for 50 years exceeded Howard's 33 years in charge but is not recognised as a record holder by Guinness.

== Personal life and death ==
His daily job was as a window-cleaner in Southport, with his clients including former Liverpool manager Kenny Dalglish, who became a personal friend. He continued his window cleaning rounds at the age of 70 when he retired from club management.

Howard died on 21 November 2025, at the age of 90.

== Honours ==
- Liverpool Senior Non-League Cup: 1975–76, 1976–77
- Cheshire County League
  - Champions: 1973–74, 1975–76, 1977–78
  - League Shield winners: 1974–75, 1975–76
- Lancashire Junior Cup, Lancashire FA Challenge Trophy: 1978–79, 1987–88, 1990–91, 1999–2000
- Liverpool Senior Cup: 1978–79, 1984–85, 1987–88, 1989–90, 1993–94, 1999–2000
- Northern Premier League
  - Premier Division champions: 1993–94, 1994–95
  - Northern Premier League Challenge Shield winners: 1994–95, 1995–96
  - Challenge Cup winners: 1984–85, 1991–92, 2003–04

== See also ==
- List of football managers with the most matches
