= Ryan Brookfield =

Retired professional footballer o

Personal information
- Full name: Ryan Brookfield
- Date of birth: 10 May 1987 (age 39)
- Place of birth: Liverpool, England
- Height: 6 ft 0 in (1.83 m)
- Position: Goalkeeper

Youth career
- 2003–2005: Chester City

Senior career*
Years	Team	Apps	(Gls)
2005–2006	Chester City	1	(0)
2006–2007	Colwyn Bay		
2007–20??	Waterloo Dock		
- * Club domestic league appearances and goals

Ryan Brookfield (born 10 May 1987) is a semi-professional English footballer who plays as a goalkeeper. He currently plays for City of Liverpool, as well as acting as their goalkeeper coach. Earlier in his career, he played in the Football League for Chester City, also representing Colwyn Bay.

== Playing career ==
Brookfield made one appearance in the Football League for Chester City, when he replaced the injured Chris MacKenzie during a 3–1 defeat at Lincoln City in December 2005. At the end of the season he was released and dropped into non-League football with Colwyn Bay.

He left Colwyn Bay towards the end of the 2006–07 season, and has since played for Waterloo Dock while working as a heat technician. In 2008–09, Brookfield helped Waterloo reach the final of the Liverpool Senior Cup before losing to Liverpool Reserves.
