= Waterloo Dock A.F.C. =

Association football club in England

Waterloo Dock
- Full name: Waterloo Dock Association Football Club
- Nicknames: The Dock; Dockers
- Founded: 1963
- Ground: Anfield Sports and Community Centre
- League: Liverpool County Premier League Premier Division
- 2024–25: Liverpool County Premier League Premier Division, 10th of 14
Home colours

Waterloo Dock A.F.C. is a football club from Liverpool, England. The club is currently in the Liverpool County Premier League Premier Division and plays its home matches at Anfield Sports and Community Centre.

== History ==
Waterloo Dock Football Club were established in 1963 and played in Liverpool Business Houses Leagues until the 1969–70 season, winning the Second Division, First Division and Premier Division titles. They joined the Liverpool County Combination in the 1970–71 season, gaining promotion at the first attempt, winning the Second Division championship. This was the start of a 34-year spell in the top flight of the Liverpool County Combination where the club was to win the First Division championship no less than twelve times and finish as runners-up on a further ten occasions.

The club's best performance in the FA Vase came in 1985–86 when the club progressed to the 4th round, eventually losing to Warrington Town.

The Liverpool County Combination merged with the I Zingari League to form the new Liverpool County Premier League at Step-7 in the National league System for the start of the 2006–07 season and Waterloo Dock have dominated the new league, winning the Premier Division title in each of the first five seasons, although the 2011–12 season saw them lose the title for the first time to Aigburth Peoples Hall when they finished 3rd, their worst league finish since 2001–02.

The club was accepted into the Liverpool Senior Cup in 2006–07 and the club fought their way past AFC Liverpool, Tranmere Rovers and Burscough in the 2008–09 season to become the first side from the Liverpool County Premier League to reach the final. Facing a Liverpool Reserves side containing many of then manager Rafael Benitez's young talents, The Dock were only sunk by a late goal from Krisztian Nemeth after matching Gary Ablett’s side for most of the game.

In November 2008 the Football Association confirmed that club manager Jimmy Davies was the longest ever serving football manager recorded in the country after he had completed 45 years in the job. The record had been held by another Merseysider, Roly Howard, who managed Marine for 33 years. In May 2013, Davies announced that, at the age of 71, he was to retire at the end of the 2012–13 season after 50 years at the helm.

== League history ==
Season	League	Final position
1963–64	Liverpool Business Houses League Second Division	
1964–65	Liverpool Business Houses League Second Division	
1965–66	Liverpool Business Houses League Second Division	2nd – Runners-up
1966–67	Liverpool Business Houses League Second Division	1st – Champions
1967–68	Liverpool Business Houses League First Division	1st – Champions
1968–69	Liverpool Business Houses League Premier Division	2nd – Runners-up
1969–70	Liverpool Business Houses League Premier Division	1st – Champions
1970–71	Liverpool County Football Combination Division Two	1st – Champions
1971–72	Liverpool County Football Combination Division One	3rd
1972–73	Liverpool County Football Combination Division One	2nd – Runners-up
1973–74	Liverpool County Football Combination Division One	5th
1974–75	Liverpool County Football Combination Division One	1st – Champions
1975–76	Liverpool County Football Combination Division One	1st – Champions
1976–77	Liverpool County Football Combination Division One	2nd – Runners-up
1977–78	Liverpool County Football Combination Division One	1st – Champions
1978–79	Liverpool County Football Combination Division One	1st – Champions
1979–80	Liverpool County Football Combination Division One	3rd
1980–81	Liverpool County Football Combination Division One	1st – Champions
1981–82	Liverpool County Football Combination Division One	3rd
1982–83	Liverpool County Football Combination Division One	5th
1983–84	Liverpool County Football Combination Division One	5th
1984–85	Liverpool County Football Combination Division One	2nd – Runners-up
1985–86	Liverpool County Football Combination Division One	2nd – Runners-up
1986–87	Liverpool County Football Combination Division One	1st – Champions
1987–88	Liverpool County Football Combination Division One	2nd – Runners-up
1988–89	Liverpool County Football Combination Division One	1st – Champions
1989–90	Liverpool County Football Combination Division One	1st – Champions
1990–91	Liverpool County Football Combination Division One	4th
1991–92	Liverpool County Football Combination Division One	5th
1992–93	Liverpool County Football Combination Division One	5th
1993–94	Liverpool County Football Combination Division One	5th
1994–95	Liverpool County Football Combination Division One	2nd – Runners-up
1995–96	Liverpool County Football Combination Division One	2nd – Runners-up
1996–97	Liverpool County Football Combination Division One	1st – Champions
1997–98	Liverpool County Football Combination Division One	3rd
1998–99	Liverpool County Football Combination Division One	4th
1999–2000	Liverpool County Football Combination Division One	1st – Champions
2000–01	Liverpool County Football Combination Division One	2nd – Runners-up
2001–02	Liverpool County Football Combination Division One	3rd
2002–03	Liverpool County Football Combination Division One	2nd – Runners-up
2003–04	Liverpool County Football Combination Division One	1st – Champions
2004–05	Liverpool County Football Combination Division One	1st – Champions
2005–06	Liverpool County Football Combination Division One	2nd – Runners-up
2006–07	Liverpool County Premier League	1st – Champions
2007–08	Liverpool County Premier League	1st – Champions
2008–09	Liverpool County Premier League	1st – Champions
2009–10	Liverpool County Premier League	1st – Champions
2010–11	Liverpool County Premier League	1st – Champions
2011–12	Liverpool County Premier League	3rd
2012–13	Liverpool County Premier League	2nd – Runners-up
2013–14	Liverpool County Premier League	2nd – Runners-up
2014–15	Liverpool County Premier League	3rd
2015–16	Liverpool County Premier League	2nd – Runners-up
2016–17	Liverpool County Premier League	3rd
2017–18	Liverpool County Premier League	4th
2018–19	Liverpool County Premier League	1st – Champions
2019–20	Liverpool County Premier League	Season voided after COVID-19 pandemic
2020–21	Liverpool County Premier League	2nd – Runners-up (season shortened)
2021–22	Liverpool County Premier League	3rd
2022–23	Liverpool County Premier League	7th
2023–24	Liverpool County Premier League	10th
2024–25	Liverpool County Premier League	10th
2025–26	Liverpool County Premier League	6th

== Records ==
- Best FA Vase performance: 4th round, 1985–86

== Honours ==
The club has won over 70 trophies since its formation. Honours include:

=== League champions ===
- Liverpool County Premier League (6): 2006–07; 2007–08; 2008–09; 2009–10; 2010–11; 2018–19
- Liverpool County Football Combination – First Division (12): 1974–75; 1975–76; 1977–78; 1978–79; 1980–81; 1986–87; 1988–89; 1989–90; 1996–97; 1999–2000; 2003–04; 2004–05
- Liverpool County Football Combination – Second Division (1): 1970–71
- Liverpool Business Houses League Premier Division (1): 1969–70
- Liverpool Business Houses League First Division (1): 1967–68
- Liverpool Business Houses League Second Division (1): 1966–67

=== League runners-up ===
- Liverpool County Premier League (4): 2012–13, 2013–14, 2015–16, 2020–21
- Liverpool County Football Combination – First Division (11): 1972–73; 1976–77; 1984–85; 1985–86; 1987–88; 1994–95; 1995–96; 2001–01; 2002–03; 2005–06; 2012–13; 2013–14
- Liverpool Business Houses League Premier Division (1): 1968–69

=== Cup-winners ===
- Liverpool County Football Combination – George Mahon Cup (11): 1974–75; 1975–76; 1977–78; 1982–83; 1986–87; 1991–92; 1995–96; 1996–97; 2000–01; 2004–05; 2009–10
- LA County Challenge Cup (9): 1976–77; 1988–89; 1994–95; 1998–99; 2003–04; 2004–05; 2005–06; 2009–10; 2012–13
- Liverpool FA Amateur Cup (1): 1975–76
- Liverpool Business Houses Senior Cup (2): 1967–68; 1969–70
- Lord Watertree Cup (1): 2002–03
- Lord Mayor's Charity Shield (2): 2004–05; 2005–06
- Fred Micklesfield Cup (1): 1976–77
- NDLB Newlands Cup (1): 1968–69

=== Cup runners-up ===
- Liverpool County Football Combination – George Mahon Cup: 2006–07; 2010–11; 2011–12; 2013–14
- LA County Challenge Cup: 2010–11

== Notable former players ==
1. Players that have played/managed in the football league or any foreign equivalent to this level (i.e. fully professional league).
2. Players with full international caps.
3. Players that hold a club record or have captained the club.

- (England) Ryan Brookfield – played in the Football League for Chester City.
- (England) Jimmy Davies - played a small number of games for the club before becoming manager for 50 years.
- (England) John Durnin – sold by the club to Liverpool FC for £500 in 1986.
- (England) Leighton McGivern – played in the Football League for Rochdale and Accrington Stanley after his first spell at the club.
- (England) Mark Maddox – played for Altrincham
- (England) Ryan Lowe – played at Sheffield Wednesday
- (England) Ray Putterill – played for Accrington Stanley and Rochdale

== Managers ==
- (England) Jimmy Davies and John Morton (1963–2013) (1995–2000) (50 years – longest serving manager in English football)
