= Jimmy Davies (football manager) =

English football manager (born 1941 or 1942)

Personal information
- Date of birth: 1941 or 1942 (age 84–85)

Senior career*
Years	Team	Apps	(Gls)
1963	Waterloo Dock		

Managerial career
- 1963–2013: Waterloo Dock
- * Club domestic league appearances and goals

James Davies (born 1941 or 1942) is an English former football manager. He managed Liverpool based side Waterloo Dock for 50 years. His claim to be the longest serving manager in England was verified by The Football Association in 2008 when he had been manager for 45 years.

== Management career ==
Davies, a dock worker in Liverpool's docks, formed the club in 1963 with friends, entering into Liverpool Business Houses League Second Division. Originally being a player for the first six weeks he moved into management for two reasons - because they never had a manager and because he wasn't as good a player as his teammates.

In 2009 the club played Liverpool's reserve team in the Liverpool Senior Cup final losing 1–0 to a goal in the last three minutes.

His final match in charge was on 29 May 2013, aged 71, was a 7–2 cup final defeat to fellow Liverpool County Premier League side Red Rum at the Dockers Club in Anfield. Alongside him at this game was assistant manager Larry Dowling, who had served the club for 48 years.

Davies and Dowling were awarded a testimonial match in 2013, with the game, played at Goodison Park, also raising money for former player Mark Maddox who is living with motor neurone disease.

During his time managing the club they won over 70 trophies.
