= I Zingari League =

Former amateur football competition

The I Zingari League was an amateur association football competition based in Liverpool, England which existed from 1895.

Its name means 'the gypsies' in dialecticised Italian, and I Zingari was the name of an English amateur cricket club formed in 1845, and an Australian one formed 40 years later. The Liverpool football league’s name invokes their spirit of amateur competition.

The league ran until 2006, when it merged with the Liverpool County Combination to form the new Liverpool County Premier League. It was at one time a feeder to the North West Counties League.

Geographically, the League's member clubs spanned an area administered by the Liverpool County Football Association, Cheshire Football Association and Lancashire County Football Association and players from the League's clubs have played in the representative teams of all three associations. Two players gained a cap for the England national amateur football team whilst playing for clubs in the I Zingari League, J B Healey (Old Xaverians) in 1908 and A E Millington (Liverpool Police) in 1930, despite the longstanding bias of the selection process in favour of players from clubs in London and the South East.

Notable local non-league clubs Marine and Formby competed in this league in the past. Formby's spell was 1931-38, during which time Albert Tomkin signed directly from Formby to Tottenham Hotspur in the Football League Second Division.

A representative fixture against the Lancashire Amateur League was played annually between 1919 and the league's discontinuation.

== Member clubs ==
The final season's Premier Division featured 14 teams. The final champions were Old Xaverians.

Alsop OB
BRNESC
Collegiate OB
East Villa
Hill Athletic
Liverpool NALGO
Mackets
NELTC
Old Xaverians
Quarry Bank OB
Red Rum
Roma
Turpins Devonshire
Warbreck

== I Zingari Combination ==
The I Zingari Combination was founded in 1904 to serve as a competition primarily for the reserve sides of I Zingari League clubs. Despite the discontinuation of the League, the Combination continues to run, hosting 39 teams across a single open-age and three veterans' divisions. Whilst no formal arrangement exists, the open-age competition frequently serves as a provider of clubs to the Liverpool County Premier League.
