= Liverpool County Premier League =

Association football league in Merseyside, England

- Founded: 2006
- Country: England
- Divisions: Premier Division
- Number of clubs: 36
- Level on pyramid: Level 11 (Premier Division)
- Feeder to: North West Counties League; Division One North and South
- Relegation to: I-Zingari Combination
- Domestic cup(s): Peter Coyne/George Mahon Cup; Zingari Challenge Cup; Roy Wade Cup; Lord Wavertree Cup
- Current champions: The Grenadier (Premier); South Liverpool (Championship); Netherley (Conference) (2025–26)
- Website: Liverpool County Premier League

The Liverpool County Premier League is a football competition based in Merseyside, England. It was founded in 2006 as a merger of the Liverpool County Football Combination and the I Zingari League.

The league has three divisions, the Premier Division, the Championship Division and the Conference Division. The Premier Division is a feeder league to the National League System and feeds the North West Counties League Division One North and South.

The league has four knockout cup competitions:

- The Peter Coyne / George Mahon Cup is open to all clubs across the three divisions. The George Mahon Cup was formerly the league cup of the Liverpool County Football Combination.
- The I Zingari Cup is open to clubs in the Premier Division. It was, as the name suggests, previously the league cup for the I Zingari League.
- The Roy Wade Cup is open to clubs in the Championship Division.
- The Lord Wavertree Cup is open to clubs in the Conference Division.

== 2026–27 members ==
=== Premier Division ===
- City of Liverpool
- East Villa Rail
- FC Community of Liverpool
- Formby
- Granby Toxteth Athletic
- L4
- Liver Academy
- Liverpool NALGO
- MSB Woolton (reserves)
- Ormskirk West End
- River
- Sefton Athletic
- Skelmersdale United
- South Liverpool
- The Grenadier
- Waterloo Dock

=== Championship Division ===
- Halewood Apollo (Under 23's)
- Long Lane
- MSB Woolton (Under-21's)
- Netherley
- Ormskirk West End (reserves)
- Redgate Rovers
- SB Litherland
- South Liverpool (Under 23's)
- Sporting Club Merseyside
- Warbreck

=== Conference Division ===
- Edge Hill Boys Club
- FC Sonny
- Formby Wanderers
- Granby Toxteth Athletic (development)
- Marina Sands
- Mandela
- Marine (Under 23's)
- Redgate Rovers (reserves)
- River (reserves)
- The Eight

== Champions ==
Season	Premier Division	Division One	Division Two
2006–07	Waterloo Dock	South Liverpool	REMYCA United
2007–08	Waterloo Dock	Aigburth Peoples Hall	Sacre Coeur Former Pupils
2008–09	Waterloo Dock	Albany Athletic	Halewood Town

Season	Premier Division	Division One	Division Two (North)	Division Two (South)
2009–10	Waterloo Dock	Essemmay Old Boys	Pinewoods	Alumni

Season	Premier Division	Division One	Division Two
2010–11	Waterloo Dock	Croxteth	Liverpool North
2011–12	Aigburth Peoples Hall	West Everton Xaviers	Kingsley United
2012–13	West Everton Xaviers	Kingsley United	The Famous Grapes
2013–14	Aigburth Peoples Hall	Liver Academy	Litherland REMYCA Reserves
2014–15	Aigburth Peoples Hall	Waterloo Grammar School Old Boys	Leyfield

Season	Premier Division	Division One	Division Two	Division Three
2015–16	Aigburth Peoples Hall	Old Xaverians Reserves	British Rail (Formerly BRNESC Reserves)	Custys

Season	Premier Division	Division One	Division Two
2016–17	Aigburth Peoples Hall	Old Xaverians Reserves	Bankfield Old Boys
2017–18	Lower Breck	British Rail	Quarry Bank Old Boys
2018–19	Waterloo Dock	FC Pilchy	Stoneycroft
2019–20	N/A due to COVID-19		
2020–21	Liverpool Nalgo	The Empress	Warbreck
2021–22	Sefton Athletic	The Frames	Joey Orr's The Edge
2022–23	MSB Woolton	The Naylo	FC King Harry

Season	Premier Division	Championship Division	Conference Division
2023–24	Halewood Apollo	FC King Harry	L4 Football Club
2024–25	MSB Woolton	The ARC	Calci
2025–26	The Grenadier	South Liverpool	Netherley

=== Number of top-tier league championships by club ===
- Waterloo Dock – 6
- Aigburth People's Hall – 5
- MSB Woolton – 2
- Halewood Apollo – 1
- Liverpool NALGO – 1
- Lower Breck – 1
- Sefton Athletic – 1
- The Grenadier – 1
- West Everton Xaviers – 1
