= Liverpool County Football Combination =

Defunct association football league (1908–2006)

The Liverpool County Football Combination was a football league based in Merseyside, England. It was founded in 1908 and had its first season in 1909–10. A second division was quickly formed, and the league ran with two divisions for the majority of its existence.

The league had a knockout competition, the George Mahon Cup, for the entire duration of its existence.

The league's last season was 2005–06, when the league champions were Speke. At the conclusion of the 2005–06 season, the league merged with the I Zingari League to form a new competition – the Liverpool County Premier League, which took the County Combination's former place at step 7 (or level 11) of the English football league system and as a feeder to the North West Counties Football League First Division. The George Mahon Cup is still contested by teams in the new league.

== Season summary ==
Season	Division 1 Champions	Division 1 Runners-Up	Division 2 Champions	Division 2 Runners-Up
1909-10	Garston Gasworks	Prescot Wireworks		
1910-11	Skelmersdale United	Prescot Wireworks	Banks Road	Widnes County Reserves
1911-12	Garston North End	Skelmersdale United	L & N.W.R. Perway	Prescot Swifts
1912-13	Garston Gasworks	Prescot Wireworks		
1913-14	Skelmersdale United	Wallasey Borough		
1914-15	Burscough Rangers	St Helens Town		
1915-16	Competition suspended - World War One			
1916-17	Competition suspended - World War One			
1917-18	Competition suspended - World War One			
1918-19	Competition suspended - World War One			
1919-20	Competition suspended - World War One			
1920-21	Skelmersdale United	Frodsham Athletic		
1921-22	Burscough Rangers	Frodsham		
1922-23	New Brighton Reserves	Wigan Borough Reserves		
1923-24	New Brighton Reserves	Ormskirk		
1924-25	Port Sunlight Athletic	Everton 'A'		
1925-26	Burscough Rangers	Whiston Parish Church		
1926-27	Burscough Rangers	New Brighton Reserves		
1927-28	Marine	Whiston		
1928-29	Whiston	Marine		
1929-30	Liverpool 'A'	Bootle Celtic		
1930-31	Marine	Everton 'A'		
1931-32	Everton 'A'	Whiston		
1932-33	Whiston	Everton 'A'		
1933-34	Marine	Everton 'A'		
1934-35	Marine	Everton 'A'		
1935-36	Everton 'A'	Skelmersdale United		
1936-37	Everton 'A'	Earlestown Bohemians		
1937-38	Everton 'A'	Hoylake Athletic		
1938-39	Skelmersdale United	Everton 'A'		
1939-40	Competition suspended - World War Two			
1940-41	Competition suspended - World War Two			
1941-42	Competition suspended - World War Two			
1942-43	Competition suspended - World War Two			
1943-44	Competition suspended - World War Two			
1944-45	Competition suspended - World War Two			
1945-46	Skelmersdale United	Marine	Marlborough	Skelmersdale United Reserves
1946-47	Liverpool 'A'	Skelmersdale United	Castner Kellner	Napiers
1947-48	Earlestown F.C.	Formby	Everton 'B'	Ellesmere Port Town Reserves
1948-49	Formby	Everton 'A'	Everton 'B'	Runcorn Athletic
1949-50	Burscough	Skelmersdale United	Skelmersdale United Reserves	Burscough Reserves
1950-51	Skelmersdale United	Everton 'A'	Everton 'B'	Earlestown Reserves
1951-52	Skelmersdale United	Formby	Fleetwood Hesketh	Everton 'B'
1952-53	Everton 'A'	Formby	Everton 'B'	Brenka
1953-54	Skelmersdale United	Everton 'A'	Burscough Reserves	Liverpool 'B'
1954-55	Everton 'A'	Liverpool 'A'	Aintree S.S.	Everton 'B'
1955-56	Liverpool 'A'	Marine Reserves		
1956-57	Unit Construction	South Liverpool Reserves		
1957-58	Dunlop (Speke)	Marine Reserves		
1958-59	Guinness Exports	Burscough Reserves		
1959-60	Guinness Exports	Unit Construction		
1960-61	Rylans Recreation	Guinness Exports		
1961-62	Guinness Exports	Langton	Guinness Exports Reserves	Waterloo Ramblers
1962-63	Guinness Exports	Langton	Guinness Exports Reserves	Unit Construction Reserves
1963-64	Guinness Exports	Unit Construction	Guinness Exports Reserves	Liverpool Transport
1964-65	Langton	Formby	Dunlop (Speke) Reserves	Lucas Sports
1965-66	Lucas Sports	Maghull		
1966-67	Aintree S.S Prescot B.I			
1967-68				
1968-69	Langton	Guinness Exports Reserves		
1969-70	Langton	Lucas Sports		
1970-71	Langton	Lucas Sports		
1971-72	Langton	Dunlop (Speke)		
1972-73	Langton	Waterloo Dock		
1973-74	Bootle	Lucas Sports		
1974-75	Waterloo Dock	Ainsdale		
1975-76	Waterloo Dock	Aintree S.S.		
1976-77	Aintree S.S.	Waterloo Dock		
1977-78	Waterloo Dock	Prescot B.I.		
1978-79	Waterloo Dock			
1979-80	St Dominics	Garswood United		
1980-81	Waterloo Dock	St Dominics		
1981-82	St Dominics	Earle		
1982-83	St Dominics	Earle		
1983-84	BRNESC	St Dominics	LMT	Littlewoods Ath
1984-85	BRNESC	Waterloo Dock	Speke B C O B	Kirkby Town Reserves
1985-86	St Dominics	Waterloo Dock	Avon Athletic	Evans
1986-87	Waterloo Dock	BRNESC		
1987-88	Uniasco	Waterloo Dock	Stantondale	Derry
1988-89	Waterloo Dock	St Dominics	Bootle Reserves	Ford Motors
1989-90	Waterloo Dock	St Dominics		
1990-91	Stantondale	St Dominics		
1991-92	Yorkshire Copper Tube	St Dominics		
1992-93	St Dominics	Lucas Sports		
1993-94	St Dominics	Lucas Sports		
1994-95	St Dominics	Waterloo Dock		
1995-96	Stockbridge	Waterloo Dock		
1996-97	Waterloo Dock	Stockbridge		
1997-98	St Dominics	Crawford United Biscuits		
1998-99	St Dominics	Manweb		
1999-2000	Waterloo Dock	Yorkshire Copper Tube		
2000-01	Yorkshire Copper Tube	Waterloo Dock		
2001-02	St. Aloysius	Speke		
2002-03	Speke	Waterloo Dock		
2003-04	Waterloo Dock	Speke		
2004-05	Waterloo Dock	St Dominics		
2005-06	Speke	Waterloo Dock		
