= Marine A.F.C. =

Association football club in England

Coordinates: 53.485157°N 3.03363°W

Marine
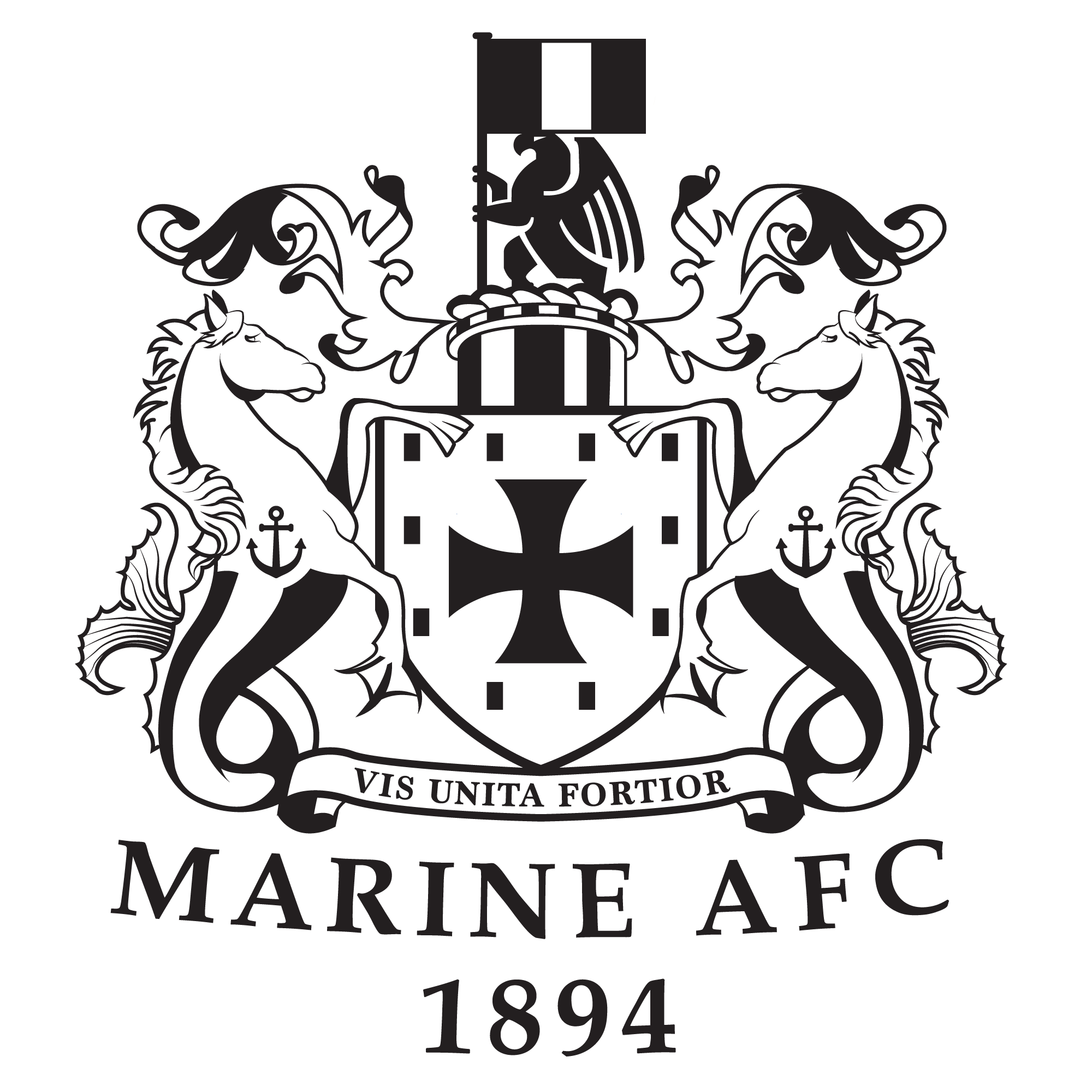
- Marine AFC Crest
- Full name: Marine Association Football Club
- Nicknames: The Mariners, The Lilywhites
- Founded: 1894
- Ground: Rossett Park, Crosby
- Capacity: 3,058 (519 seated)
- Chairman: Paul Leary
- Manager: Bobby Grant
- League: National League North
- 2025–26: National League North, 12th of 24
- Website: http://www.marinefc.com
Home colours	Away colours

Marine Association Football Club is a football club based in Crosby, Merseyside, England. The club, which was founded in 1894, is a member of both the Liverpool County and Lancashire County Football Associations, and currently plays in the National League North, the sixth tier of the English football league system.

Marine is also notable for having the longest-serving manager in postwar English football. Roly Howard occupied the post from 1972 to 2005 and oversaw a total of 1,975 games.

== History ==
=== 1894–1970 ===
The club was formed in 1894 by a group of local businessmen and former college students. Marine takes its name from a hotel on the River Mersey sea front at Waterloo, seven miles to the north of Liverpool city centre, where the founders of the club met. Marine moved to its present ground, Rossett Park, in 1903.

In 1923, a Marine player won international honours for the first time when Robert Idwal Davies was selected in the Wales team to face Scotland. Davies was one of four debutants.

Marine quickly won multiple titles in the I Zingari League and the Liverpool Combination. The club's greatest success as an amateur team in this period culminated in an FA Amateur Cup Final appearance in 1931–32, where they lost 7–1 to Dulwich Hamlet in front of a crowd of 22,000 fans at the Boleyn Ground.

In 1935–36, the club moved to the all-professional Lancashire Combination and enjoyed limited success before moving to the Cheshire County League in 1969–70.

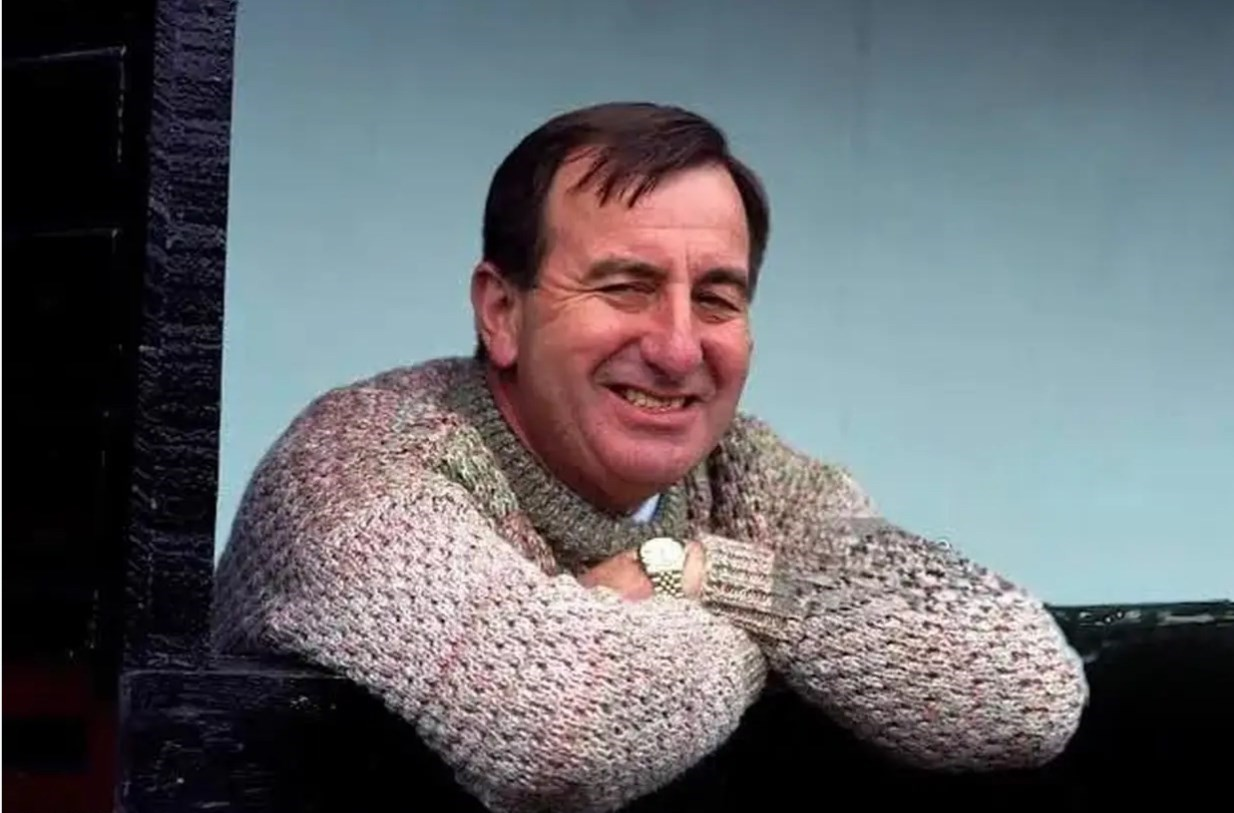
Marine Manager Roly Howard

=== 1970–2010 ===
In 1972, Roly Howard was appointed first team manager. Over a 33-year period he completed 1,975 competitive games, before being forced out at the end of the 2004–05 season. He was recognised by the Guinness Book of Records as the longest serving manager in world football as Marine enjoyed their most successful period, winning 30 trophies.

The club relinquished its amateur status and became professional in 1974. Following this, three Cheshire League Championships were won in five seasons before Marine progressed to the Northern Premier League in 1979–80, where they remained continuously until the end of the 2023–24 season. They were Champions twice in the 1993–94 and 1994–95 seasons as well as finishing as runners-up on two occasions. Marine have also won the League Challenge Cup on four occasions in 1984–85, 1991–92, 2002–03 and 2015–16.

In 1999, the magazine FourFourTwo included a monthly feature on the club, sending Michael Hann to follow them for an entire season. In 2001, Marine were the subject of a six-part television series for Granada TV, titled Marine Lives. The series included footage of former player Jason McAteer returning to visit the club.

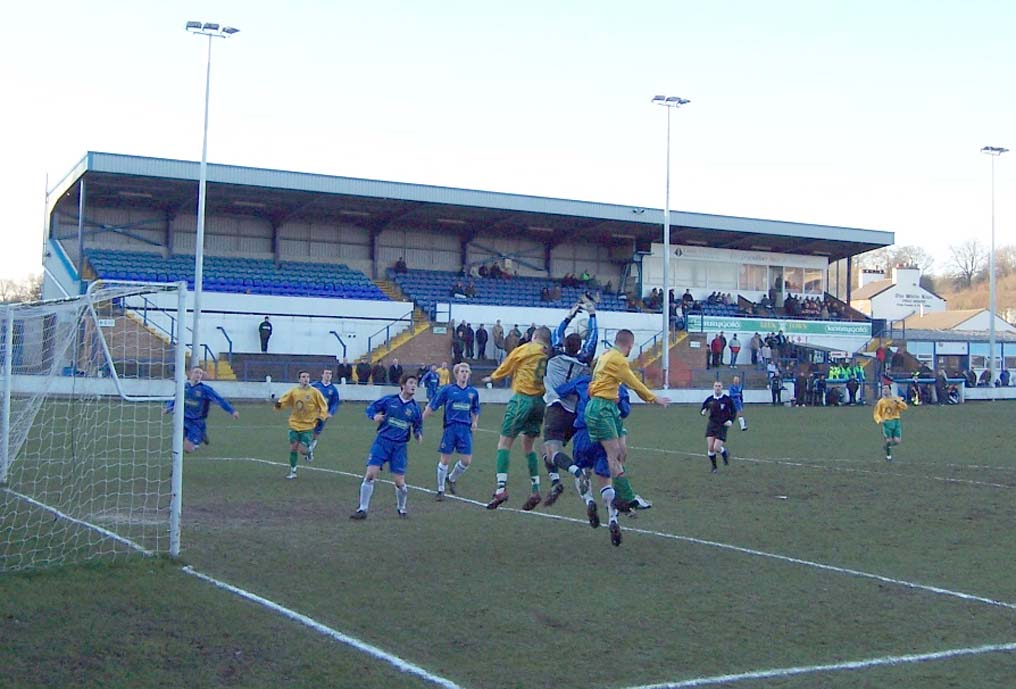
Marine (yellow shirts) playing away against Leek Town in 2006

Under the new management team of Alvin McDonald and assistant Peter Carroll, Marine qualified for the Northern Premier Division play-offs twice in succession (2005–06 and 2006–07), losing to the eventual winners each time. In the 2007–08 season, the club won the Liverpool Senior Cup. McDonald left the club partway through the 2008–09 season with players Kevin Lynch and Phil Brazier being appointed caretakers. At the end of the season, Lynch was appointed permanent manager with Brazier as his assistant.

=== 2010–present ===
Lynch departed the club at the end of the 2012–13 season to become first team coach at Chesterfield, and was replaced by Brazier. However, Brazier was sacked at the end of the following season with the club having narrowly avoided relegation.

Carl Macauley took over at the beginning of the 2014–15 season, but a poor run of form saw the club in the relegation zone, 11 points from safety, and he was sacked. Defender Sean Hessey was placed in temporary charge until the end of the season, and guided the club to a remarkable escape from relegation, with only one defeat in their final twelve games. The club were reprieved from relegation despite finishing in 21st place, due to having the highest average points per game of clubs in the highest relegation spots across the three equivalent divisions. This meant that the club continued to hold their record as the longest-serving members of the Northern Premier League. Hessey was confirmed as the club's permanent manager prior to the end of the 2014–15 season.

In the 2015–16 season, Marine secured a 15th-place finish. They beat Glossop North End, Ramsbottom United, Workington, Ossett Town and Colwyn Bay en route to the League Cup final against Scarborough Athletic, held at Throstle Nest, home of Farsley Celtic. Going 0–1 down in the 58th minute, it wasn't until Hessey subbed himself on for Willis in the 80th minute that Marine looked dangerous, and Warren Bellew scored in the 87th minute. At 1–1, in the fourth minute of added time, that season's highest club goalscorer Danny Mitchley curled in an effort from the edge of the box to win the game for Marine. This was the fourth time that Marine FC won the league cup, a record for this competition.

Towards the end of a dismal 2016–17 season. Hessey left the club and was replaced by Tommy Lawson. A mass walk-out of players didn't help Lawson but he managed to assemble a squad at short notice. He then guided the club away from the relegation zone after 5 wins in 11 games. Marine finished in 18th place in the table.

The 2017–18 season was once again a disappointment with Marine finishing in 19th place in the table. However, the team reached the final of the Liverpool Senior Cup where 750 fans saw them beaten 4–0 at home to Prescot Cables. They also went on a good run in the FA Trophy beating Whitby Town and Atherton Collieries. They then saw off teams from the division above in FC United and Chorley before a first ever visit to Dover Athletic saw them lose 3–4 against the Conference National team.

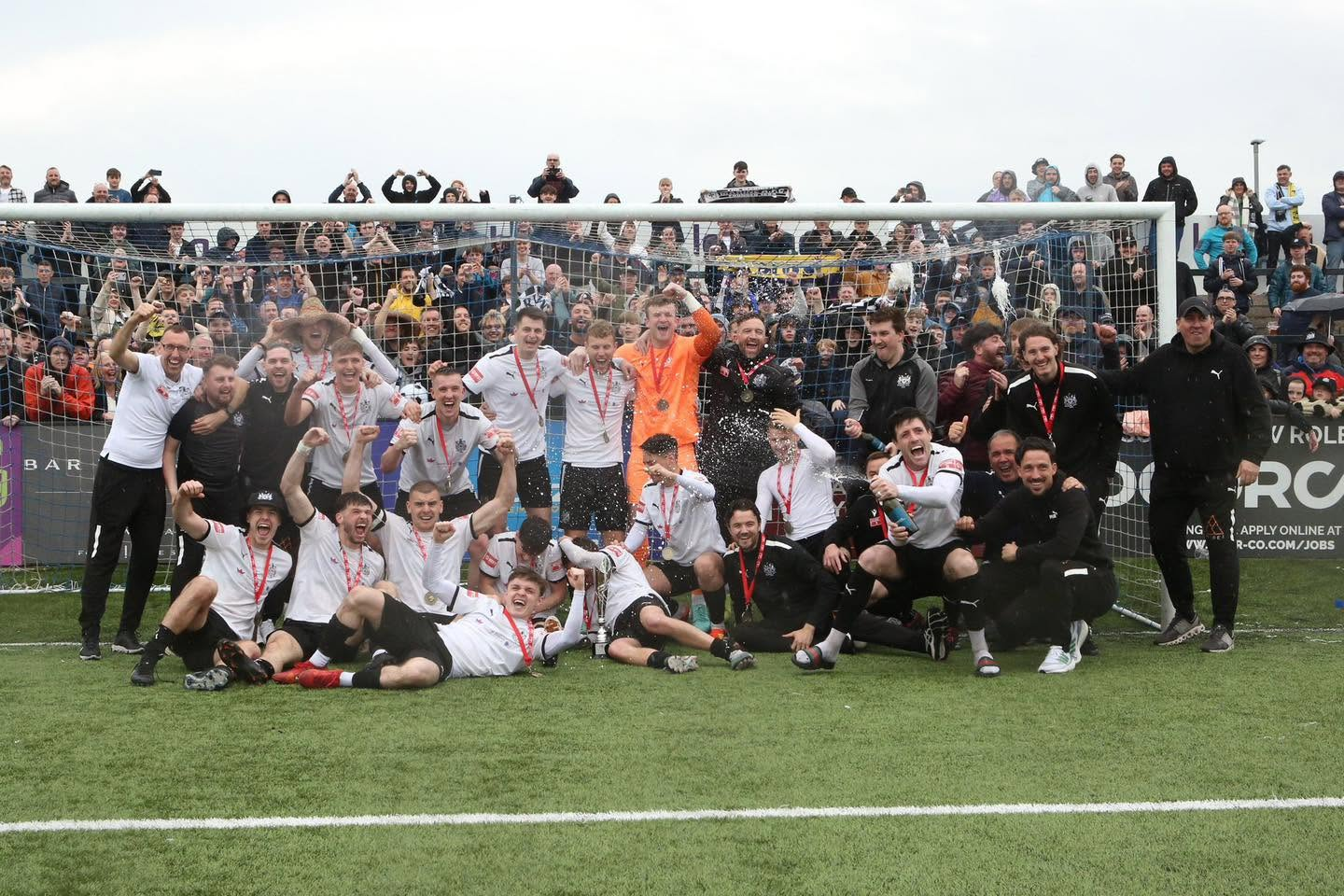
Playoff Winners 2024

In the 2018–19 season, after only five games Marine found themselves second from bottom of the league. A 2–0 defeat at home to Grantham Town on 1 September saw manager Tommy Lawson resign the following day. His assistant Ian Johnson was given temporary charge whilst the club looked for a replacement. On 13 September 2018, Marine announced the appointment of former Chester manager Neil Young. He was joined by Alan Morgan as assistant manager on 21 September 2018. Young started his tenure with a 1–0 defeat at Warrington Town on 15 September 2018. In 2019, Marine were relegated to the Northern Premier League Division One North West. It was the first relegation in their history, and followed 40 consecutive seasons at the highest level of the Northern Premier League.

In 2021, Marine reached the third round of the FA Cup, which they lost 5–0 to Tottenham Hotspur. With Marine 161 places below Tottenham, the gap between the two teams was the biggest in FA Cup history. The match raised over £300,000 for the club from the selling of 32,202 "virtual tickets" to fans of Tottenham and other clubs who wished to support Marine but were unable to attend the match due to the COVID-19 pandemic. After the FA Cup run in the 2020/21 season, Marine opened the 1894 Bar and Bistro at their ground.

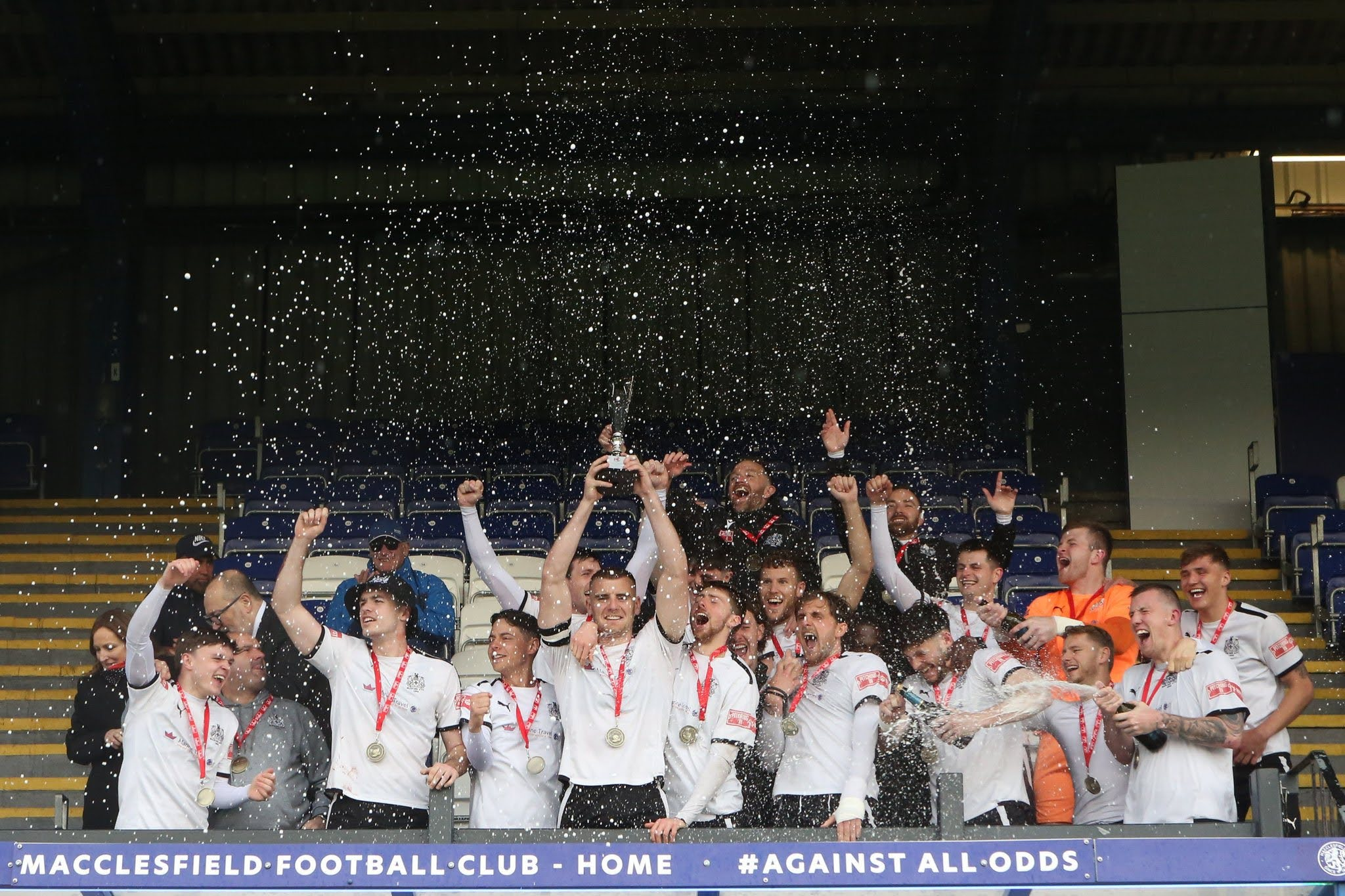
playoff final on Monday, 6 May 2024, defeating Macclesfield FC 2–1 to win the Northern Premier League Premier Division Playoff Final.

Marine finished 5th in the 2021/22 season. They played Workington in the playoff semi final which they won 3–2 after extra time and a Neil Kengni hat-trick. They then won the playoffs after coming from behind to beat Runcorn Linnets which earned them promotion to the Northern Premier League Premier Division. In the 2022/23 season Marine won the Liverpool Senior Cup beating Runcorn Linnets in the final at the DCBL Stadium 4–2 on penalties. The following year, Marine repeated their success in the Liverpool Senior Cup, and earned a second promotion in three years; being promoted to the National League North following a 2–1 victory away to Macclesfield F.C..

== FA Cup ==
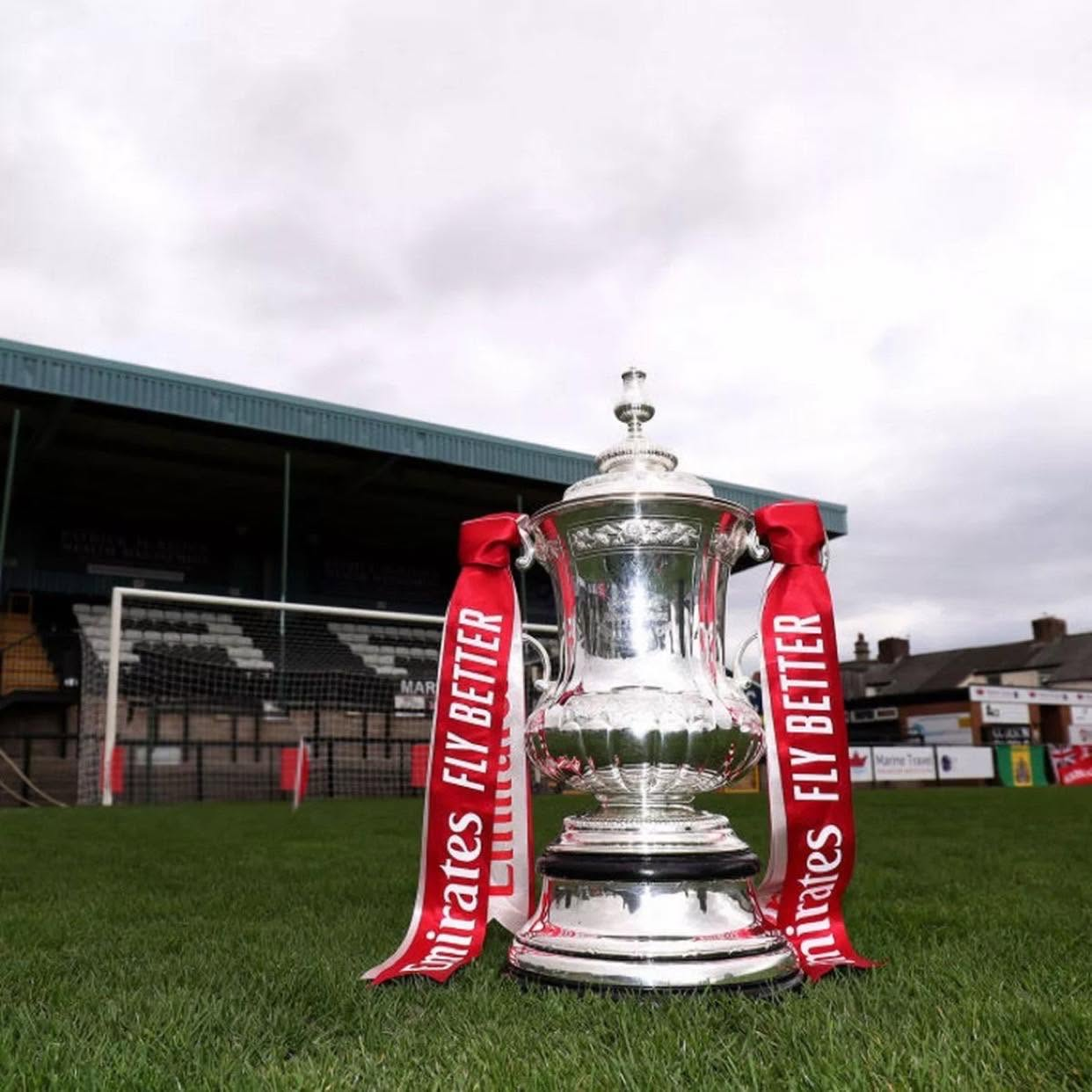
The FA Cup at Rossett Park

The club have twice reached the third round of the FA Cup.

In 1992–93 they lost 3–1 to Crewe Alexandra, and in 2020–21 they lost 5–0 to Tottenham Hotspur.

Marine have beaten three Football League clubs (Barnsley, Halifax Town, and Colchester United) in the competition.

== FA Trophy ==
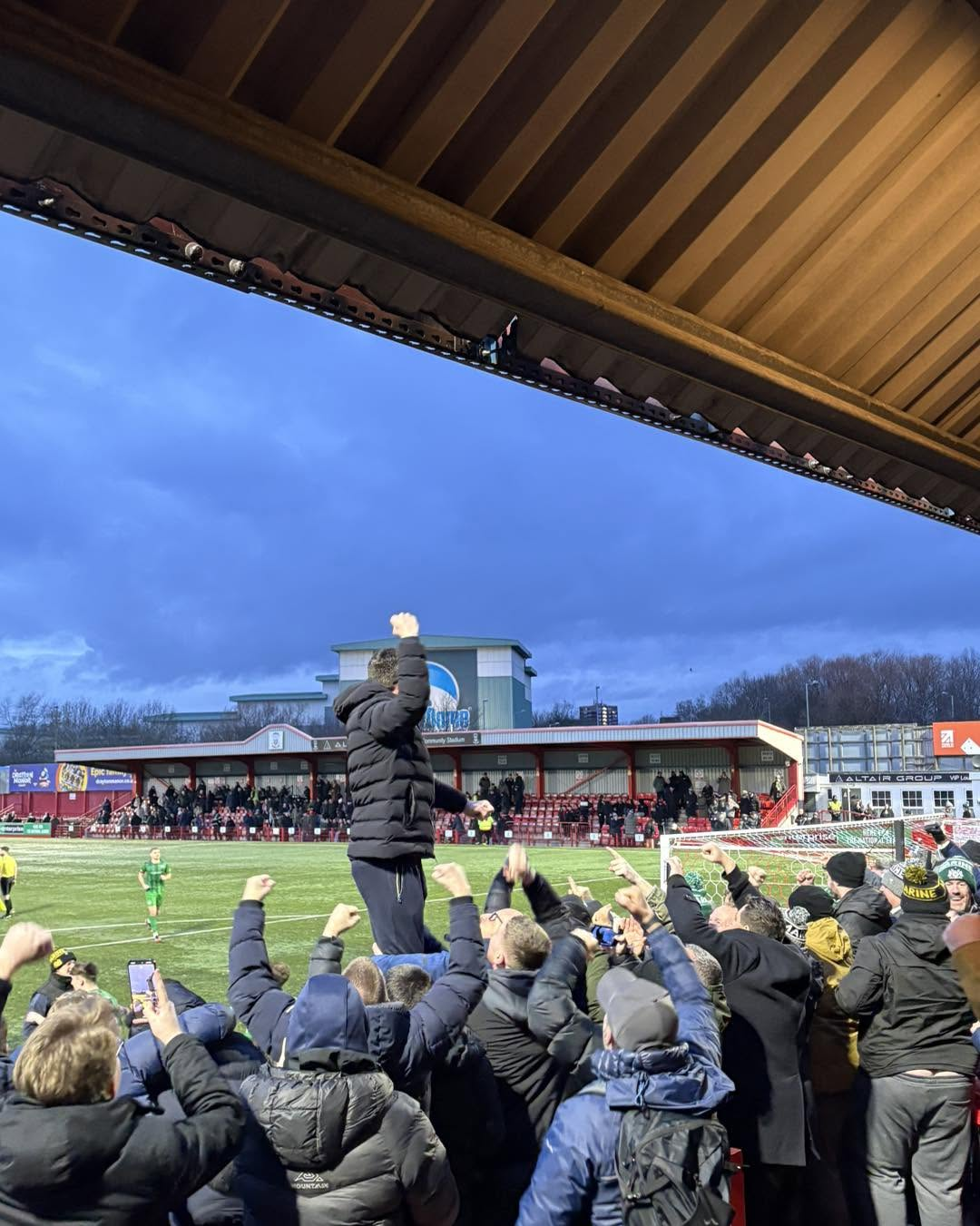
Marine Manager Bobby Grant Celebrates with Fans

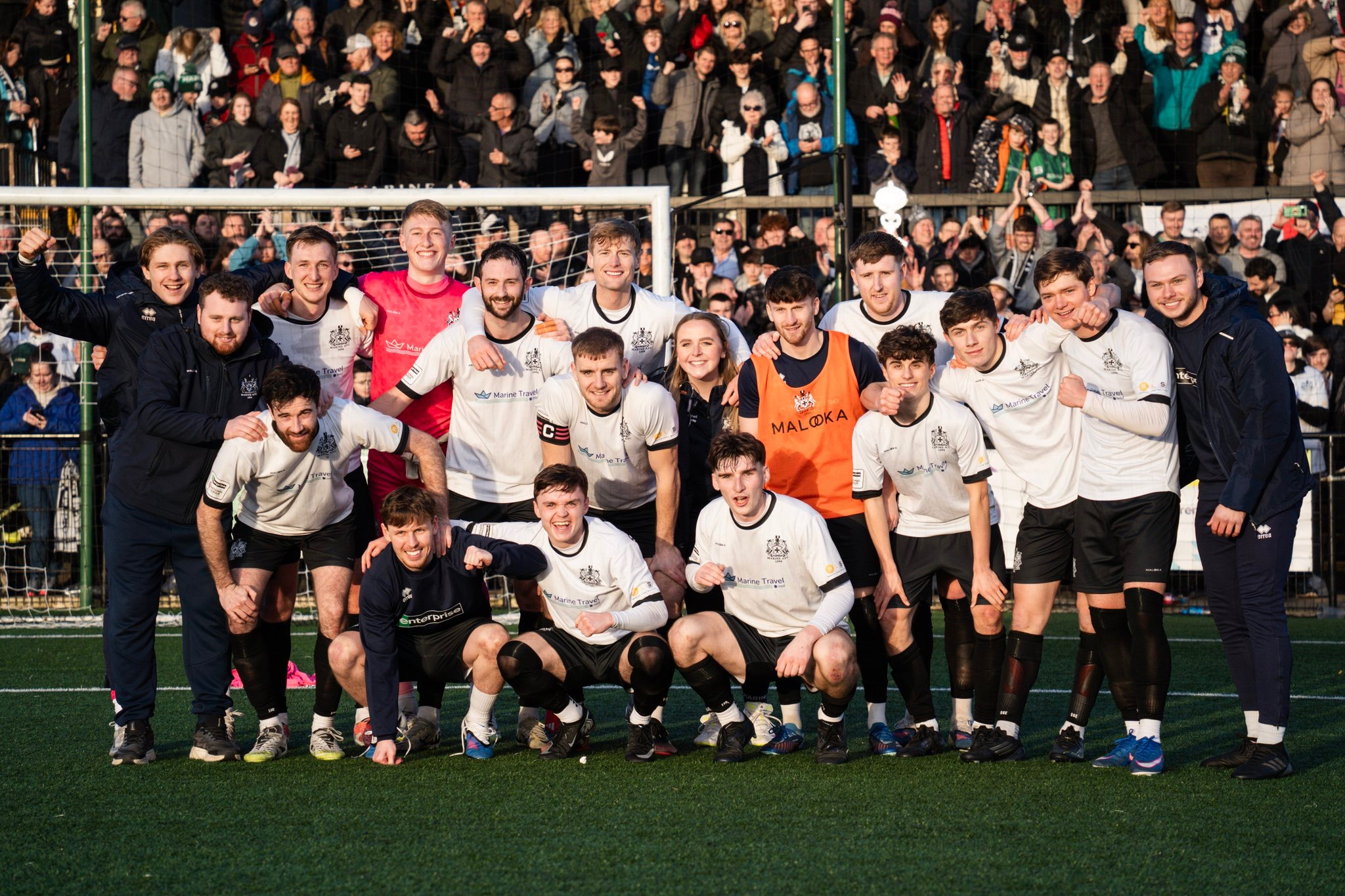
Getting to the Semi Final of the FA Trophy 2025-26

Marine have three times reached the semi-finals of the FA Trophy, in 1983–84, 1991–92, and 2025–26. The first two times, they played a team from the Northwich area and they drew away, 1–1 and 2–2 respectively, before losing at home.

In 1983–84, they lost 1–3 on aggregate to Northwich Victoria.

In 1991–92, they lost 3–6 on aggregate to Witton Albion.

In 2025–26, they lost 1–0 to Wealdstone.

== Northern Premier League Challenge Cup ==
Marine have appeared in six finals, winning the cup a record four times.

Runners Up 1980–81, 3–4 vs Runcorn

Winners 1984–85 3–2, vs Goole Town

Runners Up 1985–86, 0–1 Hyde United

Winners 1991–92, 1–0 Frickley Athletic

Winners 2002–03, 3–0 (on aggregate) vs Gateshead

Winners 2015–16, 2–1 vs Scarborough Athletic

Marine have also been winners of 13 senior county cups.

== Stadium ==
The club play at Rossett Park, located on College Road in Crosby. It is believed that the ground has been in use since at least 1884 when rugby union was played there. Marine have played at the ground since 1903, when they moved from their previous ground at Waterloo Park, Crosby. In 1949, Marine played host to Nigeria at Rossett Park – all but one of whom played without boots – with the visitors winning 5–2. The crowd was officially given as 4,000 with some considering it to be 6,000.

Between 2006 and 2015, the ground was known as the Arriva Stadium due to a sponsorship deal.

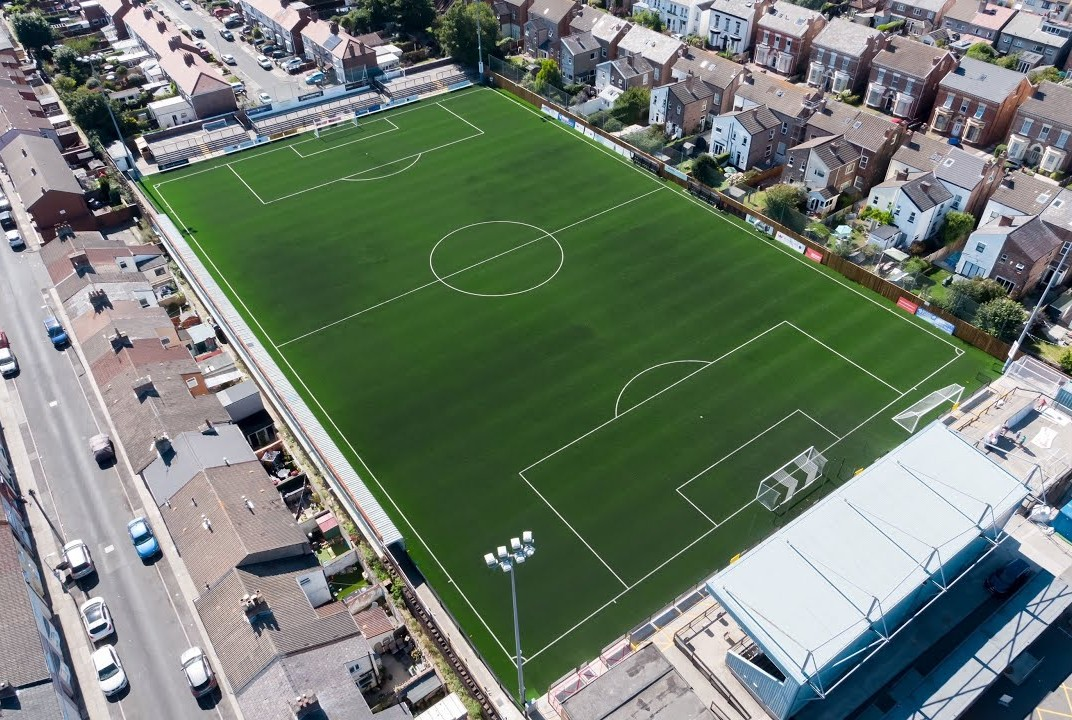
Drone Image of Rossett Park

On 24 January 2011, the club announced plans to develop the Arriva Stadium. The outdated floodlights were replaced in the summer of 2012 with a new eco friendly four corner system. The 20m high masts have a total of 28 lamps and these generate in excess of 350 lux, which was the Football League lighting requirement at the time of installation. Further to these plans, the club planned to build a 130-seat covered stand at the Crosender Road end of the ground. The total cost of all the improvements was estimated at £150,000.

On 25 January 2014, the club announced a two-year ground share agreement with North West Counties Premier Division side A.F.C. Liverpool. This has now extended to the 2021–22 season.

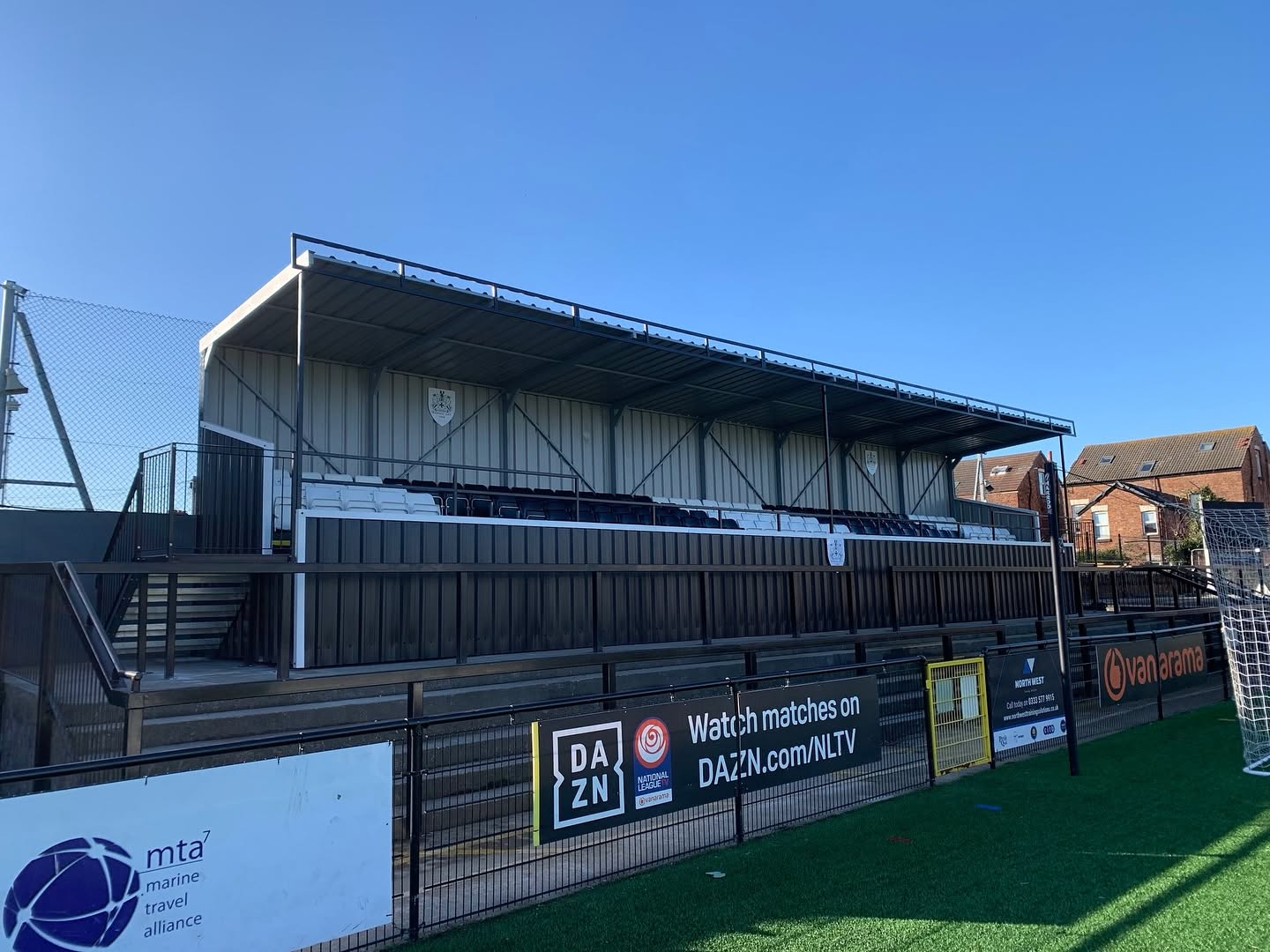
New Crosender Stand at Rossett Park

In August 2015, Rossett Park was renamed the Marine Travel Arena as a result of a sponsorship deal with the club's existing shirt sponsors, Marine Travel. The deal will continue until 2024.

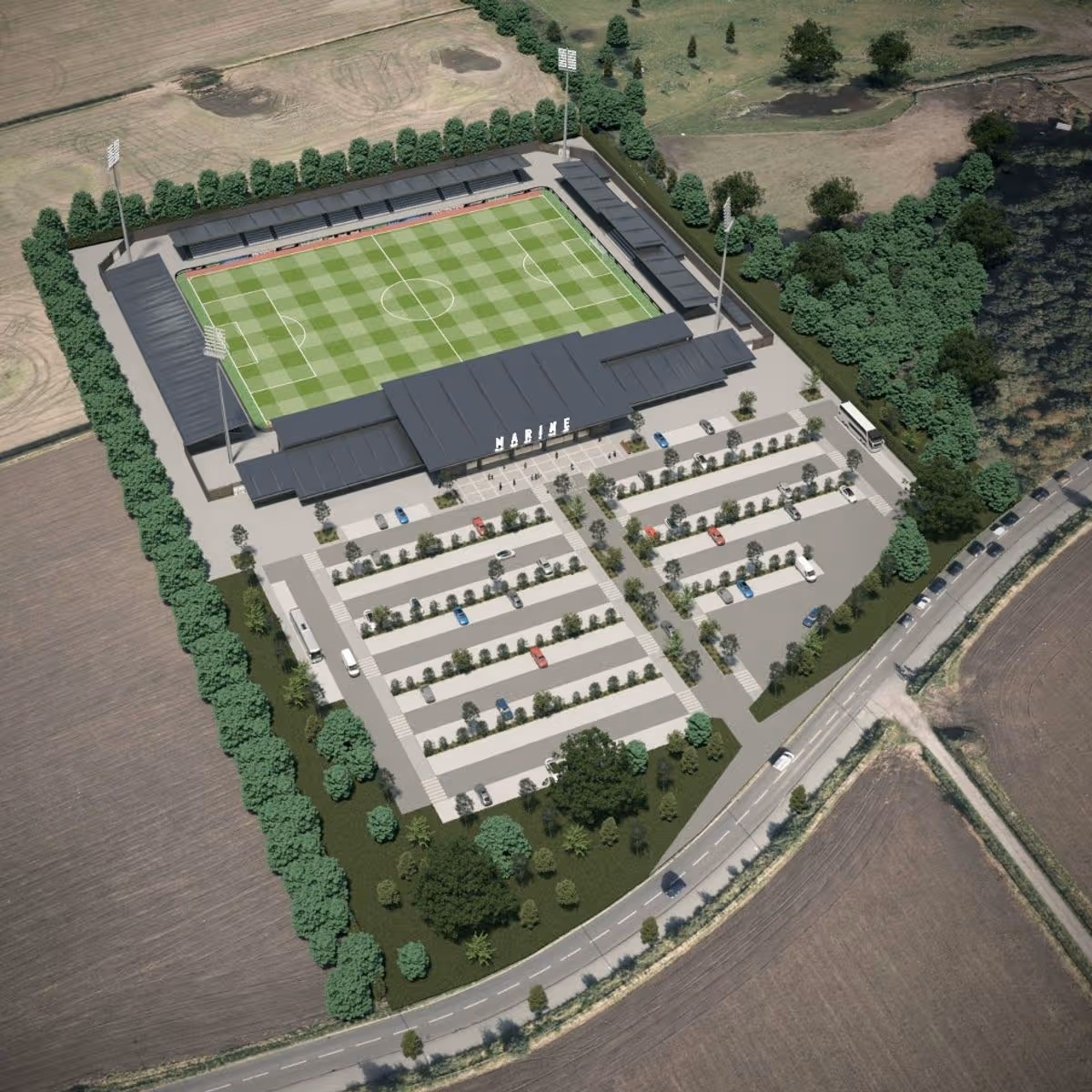
Marine's New Stadium Plan

On 3 May 2022, the club began to dig up the pitch to install a new 4G pitch, after delaying it from the previous summer. This again was funded with the income from the FA Cup run in the 20–21 season. This project was finalised on 12 July.

In May 2024, the club announced plans to build a new stadium, with a fundraising target of £5 million to enable this to happen. In December 2024, it was revealed that Marine had signed an option agreement on a plot of land for the new stadium, subject to planning and funding. In February 2025, the club revealed plans for a new 5,000 capacity stadium in Thornton.

== Colours and badge ==
Marine's traditional home kit consists of white shirts with black trim, complemented by black shorts and socks. The traditional away kit was yellow and green however, the away colours have been blue in recent years. For the 2025/26 season, a fan vote was held, with supporters choosing an all-green kit.

The club badge is a black and white coat of arms, featuring design elements that pay homage to the town of Crosby where the club is based. The crest incorporates two seahorses, which were part of the previous design and the old Crosby council badge. The year the club was founded, 1894, is also prominently displayed. The motto, "Vis Unita Fortior," which translates from Latin to "United in Strength," remains a key feature of the badge.

== Supporters ==
=== Marine Supporters Association (MSA) ===
The club had a supporters association known as the MSA (Marine Supporters Association) that was formed in the late 1980s. The supporters association raises funds for the club, arranges away coach travel to many games, and operates the club's merchandise shop. The MSA was disbanded in November 2021.

=== The Crosender Way (TCW) ===
The Crosender Way is an independent supporters' group for the football club. The group was originally founded in January 2017 by Marine supporters Mark Wilcock and Phil Riding. The name is a tribute to the area around the club's stadium, specifically Crosender Road.

The group's primary goal is to support the club and its fans. They are known for actively promoting the team on social media and for organising away travel for all supporters.

== Current squad ==
As of 18 October 2026

Note: Flags indicate national team as defined under FIFA eligibility rules; some limited exceptions apply. Players may hold more than one non-FIFA nationality.

No.	Pos.	Nation	Player
1	GK	ENG	Jack McIntyre
2	DF	IRL	Isaac Abankwah
3	DF	ENG	Jack Doyle
4	MF	IRL	Leigh Whelan
5	DF	ENG	James Butler
6	DF	ENG	Declan Drysdale
7	FW	ENG	Finlay Sinclair-Smith
8	MF	ENG	Harvey Gregson (Vice Captain)
9	FW	ENG	George Newell
10	MF	ENG	Matty McDonald
11	FW	ENG	Conor McAleny
12	DF	ENG	Adam Anson
14	FW	ENG	Tom Lawless

No.	Pos.	Nation	Player
17	FW	ENG	Charlie Jolley
19	FW	ENG	George Kattah
20	MF	ENG	Harry Huby
21	DF	ENG	Josh Wardle (Captain)
22	DF	ENG	Ben Darby
23	GK	ENG	Connor Timmins
24	MF	ENG	Will McNulty
26	MF	ENG	Arjan Raikhy (on loan from Boston United)
28	MF	ENG	Matty Whittingham
29	FW	ENG	Cole Simms (on loan from Wigan Athletic)
30	FW	ENG	James Potter

== Technical and medical staff ==
Manager	Bobby Grant
Assistant manager	Paul Bowes
1st Team coach	Chris Stammers
Goalkeeping coach	Dean Baker
Kit Manager & Team Analyst	Sean O Dochartaigh
Physiotherapist	Niamh Milburn
Assistant Physiotherapist	Alex Whittle

== Club officials and directors ==
President	Brian Lawlor
Director of Football	Jimmy Holmes
CEO	James Leary
Non-Executive Director	Alf Mangor Johannessen
Non-Executive Director	Dave Thompson
Non-Executive Director	Tina Vale
Chairman	Paul Leary
Vice Chairman	David McMillan
Secretary	Richard Cross
Commercial Director	Rob Armes

== Management team ==
Head of Operations	Vacant
Head Treasurer	Beckie Eustace
Head of Memberships	Mark Prescott
Commercial Development Manager	Darren Court
Head of Bar & Events	Jack Barton

== Media team ==
Head of Media	David McMillan
Social & Digital Media	Mark Wilcock
Photographer	Nick Parris
Photographer	Luke Reynolds
Matchday Media	Adam Yates
Matchday Media	Danny Stewart
Matchday Media	Fallon Davies
Matchday Media	Lydia Durband
Matchday Media	Matthew Swinnerton

== Shirt sponsors and manufacturers ==
Season	Kit Manufacturer	Shirt Sponsor
2002–2004	EN-S	Johnsons Apparelmaster
2004–2006	Macron	02
2006–2010	Macron	Ascol
2010–2011	Adidas	Maghull
2011–2013	Adidas	Beckie-L
2014–2015	Adidas	Marine Travel
2015–2021	Macron	Marine Travel
2021–2022	Puma	Cancer Research UK
2022–2023	Puma	Focus Travel
2023–2024	Puma	Marine Travel
2024–present	Malooka	Marine Travel

== Managers ==
Name	Years
(England) Roly Howard	1972–2005
(England) Alvin McDonald	2005–2009
(England) Kevin Lynch	2009–2013
(England) Phil Brazier	2013–2014
(England) Carl Macauley	2014–2015
(England) Sean Hessey	2015–2017
(England) Tommy Lawson	2017–2018
(England) Neil Young	2018–2025
(England) Bobby Grant	2025–present

== International appearances ==
The following table shows players who have received an international cap while playing for the club (including substitutions) arranged alphabetically by nation in descending order:

Time at Club	Player	Nation	Appearances	Goals	Ref.
2010–2012	(Barbados) Neil Harvey	Barbados	2	0	
1992–1996	(England) Brian Ross	England C	6	0	
1994–1997	(England) Liam Watson	England C	2	0	
2019–2023	(Saint Lucia) Josh Solomon-Davies	Saint Lucia	1	0	
1921–1923	(Wales) Idwal Davies	Wales	1	0	

== Records ==
- Best league finish: 12th of 24 in National League North, 2025–26
- Best FA Cup performance: Third round, 1992–93, 2020–21
- Best FA Trophy performance: Semi-finals, 1983–84, 1991–92, 2025–26
- Best FA Amateur Cup performance: Runners-up, 1931–32

== Honours ==
- FA Amateur Cup
  - Runners-up: 1931–32
- I Zingari League
  - First Division champions: 1902–03, 1903–04, 1909–10, 1919–20, 1920–21, 1922–23
  - Second Division champions: 1901–02
  - League Cup winners: 1919–20, 1920–21, 1922–23
  - Combination Cup winners: 1919–20, 1920–21, 1921–22
- Liverpool Amateur Cup
  - Winners: 1909–10, 1919–20, 1922–23, 1926–27, 1927–28, 1928–29, 1930–31, 1952–53, 1970–71
- Liverpool County Combination
  - First Division champions: 1927–28, 1930–31, 1933–34, 1934–35, 1943–44
- Liverpool County Medal Competition
  - Winners: 1920–21
- Liverpool Challenge Cup
  - Winners: 1942–43, 1944–45, 1971–72
- Lancashire Amateur Cup
  - Winners: 1921–22, 1925–26, 1930–31, 1931–32, 1932–33, 1933–34
- George Mahon Cup
  - Winners: 1930–31, 1943–44, 1944–45
- Lancashire Combination
  - Cup winners: 1946–47
  - League Cup winners: 1963–64, 1968–69
- Liverpool Senior Non-league Cup
  - Winners: 1968–69, 1975–76, 1976–77
- Cheshire County League
  - Champions: 1973–74, 1975–76, 1977–78
  - League Shield winners: 1974–75, 1975–76
- Lancashire Junior Cup / Lancashire FA Challenge Trophy
  - Winners: 1978–79, 1987–88, 1990–91, 1999–2000
- Liverpool Senior Cup
  - Winners: 1978–79, 1984–85, 1987–88, 1989–90, 1993–94, 1999–2000, 2007–08, 2022–23, 2023–24
- Northern Premier League
  - Premier Division champions: 1993–94, 1994–95
  - Premier Division Play Off winners: 2023–24
  - Northern Premier League Challenge Shield winners: 1994–95, 1995–96
  - Challenge Cup winners: 1984–85, 1991–92, 2003–04 and 2015–16.
