= 1993–94 North West Counties Football League =

The 1993–94 North West Counties Football League season (known as the Carling North West Counties League for sponsorship reasons) was the 12th in the history of the North West Counties Football League, a football competition in England.

The league comprised two divisions, Division One and Division Two (at levels 8 and 9 respectively of the English football league system), and there were additionally three cup competitions: the League Challenge Cup knockout competition (known as the Carling League Cup for sponsorship reasons), open to all the league's clubs; the Second Division Trophy (known as the Lamot Pils Trophy for sponsorship reasons), a knockout trophy competition for Division Two clubs only; and the Floodlit Trophy competition (known as the Tennents Floodlit Trophy for sponsorship reasons) for all the league's clubs with floodlights. The league also had a reserves team section.

== Division One ==
North West Counties Football League Division One
- Season: 1993–94
- Teams: 22
- Champions: Atherton Laburnum Rovers
- Promoted: Atherton Laburnum Rovers
- Relegated: Flixton
- Matches: 462
- Goals: 1,395 (3.02 per match)

Division One featured 22 clubs, 20 remaining from the previous season plus 2 additions:

- Rossendale United, relegated from the Northern Premier League Division One
- Bootle, promoted as runners-up from Division Two

At the end of the season the champions for the second successive season Atherton Laburnum Rovers, who had improved their ground facilities since rejection the previous season, were automatically promoted to the Northern Premier League Division One. Third placed Burscough set a Division One record by scoring 107 league goals, the first to exceed 100 goals in a season in the division. As no club was relegated from the Northern Premier League Division One only Flixton were relegated to Division Two.

=== League table ===
Pos	Team	Pld	W	D	L	GF	GA	GD	Pts	Season End Notes
1	Atherton Laburnum Rovers (C, P)	42	25	13	4	83	34	+49	88	Promoted to Northern Premier; League Division One
2	Rossendale United	42	25	9	8	76	46	+30	84	
3	Burscough	42	22	13	7	107	50	+57	79	
4	Nantwich Town	42	22	11	9	80	54	+26	77	
5	Eastwood Hanley	42	22	11	9	75	52	+23	77	
6	Bootle	42	21	10	11	77	61	+16	73	
7	Penrith	42	20	11	11	62	44	+18	71	
8	Blackpool Rovers	42	19	10	13	64	57	+7	67	
9	Clitheroe	42	19	9	14	75	58	+17	66	
10	Kidsgrove Athletic	42	16	10	16	70	61	+9	58	
11	St Helens Town	42	14	13	15	60	55	+5	55	
12	Prescot	42	14	13	15	46	47	−1	55	
13	Maine Road	42	14	13	15	58	64	−6	55	
14	Newcastle Town	42	14	10	18	66	67	−1	52	
15	Bradford Park Avenue	42	12	12	18	54	79	−25	48	
16	Darwen	42	12	8	22	38	61	−23	44	
17	Glossop North End	42	12	8	22	58	86	−28	44	
18	Salford City	42	11	10	21	50	67	−17	43	
19	Chadderton	42	10	8	24	49	85	−36	38	
20	Bacup Borough	42	9	9	24	57	85	−28	36	
21	Skelmersdale United	42	8	8	26	55	92	−37	32	
22	Flixton (R)	42	9	5	28	35	90	−55	32	Relegated to Division Two

Source: NWCFL: Final Tables, Season 1993/94
Rules for classification: 1) points; 2) goal difference; 3) number of goals scored.
(C) Champions; (P) Promoted; (R) Relegated

== Division Two ==
North West Counties Football League Division Two
- Season: 1993–94
- Teams: 18
- Champions: Haslingden
- Promoted: Holker Old Boys; North Trafford
- Relegated: None
- Matches: 306
- Goals: 1,125 (3.68 per match)

Division Two featured 18 clubs, 16 remaining from the previous season plus 2 additions:

- Blackpool Mechanics, relegated from Division One
- Haslingden, joined from the West Lancashire Football League

Over the season a new league record of 3.68 average goals per match was established (fractionally exceeding the 3.64 from Division Two the previous season).

At the end of the season the champions Haslingden established a new league season goalscoring record with 117 goals scored in 34 matches beating the previous best of 110 from 38 matches by Radcliffe Borough eleven years previously in the 1982–83 season. However they were not promoted as their ground did not meet the Division One ground grading requirements; runners-up North Trafford and third placed Holker Old Boys (the latter benefiting from Haslingden's shortcoming) were both were promoted. Two clubs, Ellesmere Port Town and K Chell folded and left the division. Last placed Squires Gate with only one league win equalled the league all time fewest wins in a season.

=== League table ===
Pos	Team	Pld	W	D	L	GF	GA	GD	Pts	Season End Notes
1	Haslingden (C)	34	26	5	3	117	39	+78	83	
2	North Trafford (P)	34	24	2	8	95	36	+59	74	Promoted to Division One
3	Holker Old Boys (P)	34	23	3	8	75	40	+35	72	Promoted to Division One
4	Stantondale	34	20	8	6	88	45	+43	68	
5	Castleton Gabriels	34	19	6	9	55	46	+9	63	
6	Nelson	34	16	8	10	75	52	+23	56	
7	Atherton Collieries	34	15	9	10	58	40	+18	54	
8	Maghull	34	15	8	11	70	46	+24	53	
9	Ellesmere Port Town	34	14	8	12	62	63	−1	50	Club folded
10	Formby	34	12	11	11	59	50	+9	47	
11	Oldham Town	34	13	6	15	61	68	−7	45	
12	Cheadle Town	34	11	9	14	69	62	+7	42	
13	Blackpool Mechanics	34	10	5	19	50	69	−19	35	
14	Westhoughton Town	34	9	3	22	53	100	−47	30	
15	Ashton Town	34	7	8	19	42	91	−49	29	
16	Irlam Town	34	8	4	22	41	73	−32	28	
17	K Chell	34	4	6	24	35	97	−62	18	Club folded
18	Squires Gate	34	1	9	24	20	108	−88	12	

Source: NWCFL: Final Tables, Season 1993/94
Rules for classification: 1) points; 2) goal difference; 3) number of goals scored.
(C) Champions; (P) Promoted

== League Challenge Cup ==
The 1993–94 League Challenge Cup (known as the Carling League Cup for sponsorship reasons) was a knockout competition open to all the league's clubs. The final between Division One clubs, played at Bury F.C., was won by Rossendale United who defeated St Helens Town 1–0.

Semi-finals and Final

The semi-finals were decided on aggregate score from two legs played

Semi-finals
Rossendale United (D1)	3	3	6
Stantondale (D2)	0	0	0
St Helens Town (D1)	2	3	5
Blackpool Rovers (D1)	1	1	2

Final (Note: Played at Bury F.C.)
Rossendale United (D1)	1
St Helens Town (D1)	0

Club's division appended to team name: (D1)=Division One; (D2)=Division Two
sources:

- Semi-finals: "Blackpool Rovers 1 St Helens Town 3". Daily Post. Liverpool. 21 March 1994. p. 28.; "Results Service: Carling North West Counties: Carling Cup semi-finals". Rossendale Free Press. Rochdale. 25 March 1994. p. 54.
- Final: "We did it!". Rossendale Free Press. Rochdale. 6 May 1994. p. 52.

== Second Division Trophy ==
The 1993–94 Second Division Trophy (known as the Lamot Pils Trophy for sponsorship reasons) was a knockout competition for Division Two clubs only. In the final North Trafford won 3–1 over Maghull (their second successive Trophy final loss) in the match played at Skelmersdale United F.C.

Semi-finals and Final

The semi-finals were decided on aggregate score from two legs played

Semi-finals
Ellesmere Port Town	1	2	3
Maghull	2	7	9
Haslingden	2 (Note: Haslingden's pitch unfit, their home tie played at North Trafford)	0	2
North Trafford	3	6	9

Final (Note: Played at Skelmersdale United F.C.)
Maghull	1
North Trafford	3

sources:

- Semi-finals: "Haslingden face cup final battle". Rossendale Free Press. Rochdale. 25 March 1994. p. 54.;"Post Results Service: Local Soccer: Lamot Pils Trophy semi-final". Wigan Evening Post. Preston. 28 March 1994. p. 15.; "Port pounded". The Chronicle (Chester edition). Chester. 1 April 1994. p. 34.
- Final: "Final Blow". Liverpool Echo. Liverpool. 5 May 1994. p. 75.

== Floodlit Trophy ==
The 1993–94 Floodlit Trophy (known as the Tennents Floodlit Trophy for sponsorship reasons) was a competition open to all the league's clubs with floodlights. The all Division One club final was held at Skelmersdale United F.C. and was won by Bootle who defeated Atherton Laburnum Rovers 2–1.

== Reserves Section ==
Main honours for the 1993–94 season:

- Reserves Division
  - Winners: North Trafford Reserves
  - Runners-up: St Helens Town Reserves
- Reserves Division Cup
  - Winners: Darwen Reserves
  - Runners-up: Maghull Reserves
