= 1992–93 North West Counties Football League =

The 1992–93 North West Counties Football League season (known as the Bass North West Counties League for sponsorship reasons for the final occasion after seven seasons) was the 11th in the history of the North West Counties Football League, a football competition in England.

The league comprised two divisions (at levels 8 and 9 of the English football league system) and there were additionally three cup competitions: the League Challenge Cup knockout competition (known as the Bass League Cup for sponsorship reasons), open to all the league's clubs; the Second Division Trophy (known as the Lamot Pils Trophy for sponsorship reasons), a knockout trophy competition for Division Two clubs only; and the Floodlit Trophy competition for all the league's clubs with floodlights (known as the Tennents Floodlit Trophy for sponsorship reasons). The league also had a reserves team section.

== Division One ==
North West Counties Football League Division One
- Season: 1992–93
- Teams: 22
- Champions: Atherton Laburnum Rovers
- Promoted: Bamber Bridge
- Relegated: Blackpool Mechanics
- Matches: 462
- Goals: 1,356 (2.94 per match)

Division One was expanded to 22 clubs (from 18 the previous season) which comprised 14 remaining from the previous season plus 8 additional, all from Division Two: of these Bamber Bridge and Newcastle Town were promoted as champions and runners-up respectively and the 6 others were advanced not solely on the basis of their position in the final table but also having suitable ground grading. The 8 clubs were:

- Bamber Bridge, promoted as champions
- Blackpool Mechanics
- Burscough
- Chadderton
- Glossop North End (who changed their name from Glossop)
- Kidsgrove Athletic
- Newcastle Town, promoted as runners-up
- Salford City

Over the season the champions Atherton Laburnum Rovers with 33 league wins and 106 points from their 42 matches established three records: firstly for league victories in a season; secondly as the first club in the league's history to exceed a century of points, establishing a high of 106 points; and with a total of 2 defeats they established a Division One record for the fewest league defeats over a 42 match season. However as their ground did not meet the grading requirements of the Northern Premier League they were not promoted and in their place Bamber Bridge took the automatic promotion to the Northern Premier League Division One – their second promotion since joining the league in 1990.

Only one club was relegated, one of this season's expansion clubs Blackpool Mechanics: they conceded 137 goals in the season a new league record (eclipsing the 111 by Darwen in the 1982–83 season and by Newton in the 1988–89 season); and with a negative goal difference of 110 established a league record and league first for a negative goal difference of greater than 100 goals; additionally their total of two league wins was the least recorded to date by a Division One club.

=== League table ===
Pos	Team	Pld	W	D	L	GF	GA	GD	Pts	Season End Notes
1	Atherton Laburnum Rovers (C)	42	33	7	2	75	25	+50	106	
2	Bamber Bridge (P)	42	24	11	7	81	37	+44	83	Promoted to Northern Premier; League Division One
3	Chadderton	42	24	11	7	99	64	+35	83	
4	Prescot	42	20	12	10	68	44	+24	72	
5	Newcastle Town	42	20	8	14	70	57	+13	68	
6	Bradford Park Avenue	42	19	8	15	54	43	+11	65	
7	Clitheroe	42	17	8	17	61	40	+21	59	
8	St Helens Town	42	16	11	15	79	62	+17	59	
9	Salford City	42	15	13	14	58	61	−3	58	
10	Burscough	42	16	10	16	58	68	−10	58	
11	Flixton	42	14	15	13	50	42	+8	57	
12	Blackpool Rovers	42	16	9	17	66	64	+2	57	
13	Nantwich Town	42	14	15	13	60	60	0	57	
14	Penrith	42	15	11	16	62	67	−5	56	
15	Bacup Borough	42	14	13	15	66	59	+7	55	
16	Glossop North End	42	16	9	17	70	67	+3	54 (Note: Glossop North End had three points deducted)	
17	Darwen	42	14	10	18	54	61	−7	52	
18	Eastwood Hanley	42	14	10	18	45	57	−12	52	
19	Maine Road	42	12	9	21	55	63	−8	45	
20	Kidsgrove Athletic	42	9	8	25	53	94	−41	35	
21	Skelmersdale United	42	7	10	25	45	84	−39	31	
22	Blackpool Mechanics (R)	42	2	4	36	27	137	−110	10	Relegated to Division Two

Source: NWCFL: Final Tables, Season 1992/93
Rules for classification: 1) points; 2) goal difference; 3) number of goals scored.
(C) Champions; (P) Promoted; (R) Relegated

== Division Two ==
North West Counties Football League Division Two
- Season: 1992–93
- Teams: 18
- Champions: Maghull
- Promoted: Bootle
- Relegated: None
- Matches: 306
- Goals: 1,115 (3.64 per match)

Division Two featured 18 clubs, 10 remaining from the previous season plus 8 additional (only one of whom were league members the previous season):

- Bootle, relegated from Division One
- Burnley Bank Hall, promoted as champions of the West Lancashire League Division One
- Ellesmere Port Town, a newly formed club
- Irlam Town, resigned from the Northern Premier League Division One
- K Chell, promoted as champions of the West Midlands (Regional) League Division Two
- Nelson, from sixteenth in the West Lancashire Football League Division Two – returning to the league following a ground grading related expulsion following the 1987–88 season
- North Trafford, from fourth in the Mid-Cheshire League Division One
- Stantondale, from third in the Liverpool County Combination Division One

Over the season a league record of average goals per match (3.64) was established (exceeding the 3.43 from Division Three ten seasons previously in the league's inaugural 1982–83 season).

At the end of the season the champions Maghull were denied promotion as their ground which lacked floodlights did not meet Division One ground grading requirements; runners-up Bootle (who had been relegated into the division this season) were the only club promoted to Division One. On the eve of the following season Burnley Bank Hall resigned from the league as they had suffered a fire at their ground and were unable to find a suitable alternative.

=== League table ===
Pos	Team	Pld	W	D	L	GF	GA	GD	Pts	Season End Notes
1	Maghull (C)	34	21	9	4	77	26	+51	72	
2	Bootle (P)	34	20	8	6	89	49	+40	68	Promoted to Division One
3	Oldham Town	34	20	6	8	79	47	+32	66	
4	Ellesmere Port Town	34	16	9	9	65	46	+19	57	
5	Stantondale	34	16	9	9	59	49	+10	57	
6	Castleton Gabriels	34	15	10	9	61	48	+13	55	
7	North Trafford	34	14	9	11	67	63	+4	51	
8	Formby	34	14	9	11	49	49	0	51	
9	Atherton Collieries	34	14	7	13	63	67	−4	49	
10	Burnley Bank Hall	34	14	4	16	87	77	+10	46	Resigned
11	Westhoughton Town	34	14	3	17	65	75	−10	42 (Note: Cheadle Town and Westhoughton Town had three points deducted)	
12	Cheadle Town	34	12	7	15	44	48	−4	40	
13	Squires Gate	34	11	5	18	56	73	−17	38	
14	K Chell	34	10	8	16	52	72	−20	38	
15	Holker Old Boys	34	8	13	13	57	60	−3	37	
16	Ashton Town	34	8	8	18	51	74	−23	32	
17	Nelson	34	7	7	20	47	82	−35	28	
18	Irlam Town	34	4	5	25	47	110	−63	17	

Source: NWCFL: Final Tables, Season 1992/93
Rules for classification: 1) points; 2) goal difference; 3) number of goals scored.
(C) Champions; (P) Promoted

== League Challenge Cup ==
The 1992–93 League Challenge Cup (known as the Bass League Cup for sponsorship reasons) was a knockout competition open to all the league's clubs. The all Division One club final, played at Bury F.C., was won by the previous season's losing finalist Burscough who defeated Nantwich Town 2–1.

Semi-finals and Final

The semi-finals were decided on aggregate score from two legs played

Semi-finals
Burscough (D1)	1	2	3
Prescot (D1)	0	2	2
Nantwich Town (D1)	3	2	5
Glossop North End (D1)	1	1	2

Final (Note: Played at Bury F.C.)
Burscough (D1)	2
Nantwich Town (D1)	1

Club's division appended to team name: (D1)=Division One
sources:

- Semi-finals: "Semi-pro results: Saturday: Bass Cup semi-finals 2nd leg". Manchester Evening News. Manchester. 15 March 1993. p. 39.
- Final: Alan Jervis (28 April 1993). "Dabbers dream is Bury'd". Crewe Chronicle. Chester. p. 28.

== Second Division Trophy ==
The 1992–93 Second Division Trophy (known as the Lamot Pils Trophy for sponsorship reasons) was a knockout competition for Division Two clubs only. League newcomers Stantondale defeated Maghull 2–1 in the final played at Burscough F.C.

Semi-finals and Final

The semi-finals were decided on aggregate score from two legs played

Semi-finals
Ellesmere Port Town	0	2	2
Maghull	5	1	6
Atherton Collieries	2	4 (Note: After extra time, score at 90 minutes: 4–1)	6
Stantondale	5	2	7

Final (Note: Played at Burscough F.C.)
Maghull	1
Stantondale	2

sources:

- Semi-finals: "Saturday Amateur: Bass NW Counties: Lamot Pils Trophy semi-finals". Liverpool Echo. Liverpool. 5 April 1993. p. 24.
- Final: Gareth Jawad (1 May 1993). "Roy's green light for a Maghull title". Football Echo. Liverpool. p. 6.

== Floodlit Trophy ==
The 1992–93 Floodlit Trophy (known as the Tennents Floodlit Trophy for sponsorship reasons) was a competition open to all the league's clubs with floodlights. The final which featured clubs from Division One was held at Wigan Athletic F.C. and won by Newcastle Town who defeated Chadderton 2–0.

== Reserves Section ==
Main honours for the 1992–93 season:

- Reserves Division (regionalised competition)
  - North Division
    - Winners: Bamber Bridge Reserves
    - Runners-up: Atherton Laburnum Rovers Reserves
  - South Division
    - Winners: Flixton Reserves
    - Runners-up: North Trafford Reserves
- Reserves Division Cup
  - Winners: Bamber Bridge Reserves
  - Runners-up: Flixton Reserves
