= List of Harrogate Town A.F.C. seasons =

Harrogate Town Association Football Club is a professional association football club based in the spa town of Harrogate, North Yorkshire, England. The club competes in League Two, the fourth tier of English football, after winning the 2019–20 National League play-offs. The club is nicknamed "Town" and also the "Sulphurites" due to Harrogate's famous sulphur springs. The club's colours are black and yellow, and they play their home games at Wetherby Road, though for a short period at the start of the 2020–21 season, the club shared Doncaster Rovers' Keepmoat Stadium while a new pitch was laid.

Harrogate Hotspurs were founded in 1935 and changed their name to Harrogate Town after football returned at the end of World War II, joining the West Yorkshire Association League. They entered the Yorkshire League again in 1957 before becoming founder members of the Northern Counties East League in 1982 and a founding member of the Northern Premier League's First Division in 1987. They won the Northern Premier League Division One title in 2001–02 and became founder members of the Conference North in 2004. They won the National League North play-offs in 2018 and then secured a place in the Football League for the first time with victory in the 2020 National League play-off final.

== Key ==
Key to league record:

- P – Played
- W – Games won
- D – Games drawn
- L – Games lost
- F – Goals for
- A – Goals against
- Pts – Points
- Pos – Final position

Key to colours and symbols:
| Symbol | Meaning |
|---|---|
| 1st or W | Winners |
| 2nd or F | Runners-up |
| * | Play-offs |
| ↑ | Promoted |
| ↓ | Relegated |

Key to rounds:

- Prelim – Preliminary round
- QR1 – First qualifying round
- QR2 – Second qualifying round, etc.
- R1 – First round
- R2 – Second round, etc.
- QF – Quarter-final
- SF – Semi-final
- F – Final
- W – Winners

== Seasons ==
List of seasons, including league division and statistics and cup results
| Season | League | | | | | | | | | FA Cup | League Cup | Other | |
| Season | Division (Note: Divisions are sorted according to their level within the English football league system at the time.) | P | W | D | L | F | A | Pts | Pos | FA Cup | League Cup | Competition | Result |
|---|---|---|---|---|---|---|---|---|---|---|---|---|---|
| 1957–58 | Yorkshire Football League Division Two | 26 | 4 | 7 | 15 | 43 | 62 | 15 | 13th | — | — | — | — |
| 1958–59 | Yorkshire Football League Division Two | 24 | 12 | 4 | 8 | 71 | 61 | 28 | 6th | — | — | — | — |
| 1959–60 | Yorkshire Football League Division Two | 28 | 15 | 6 | 7 | 62 | 34 | 36 | 5th | — | — | — | — |
| 1960–61 | Yorkshire Football League Division Two↑ | 36 | 24 | 6 | 6 | 96 | 42 | 54 | 3rd | — | — | — | — |
| 1961–62 | Yorkshire Football League Division One | 30 | 13 | 6 | 11 | 56 | 45 | 32 | 6th | QR2 | — | — | — |
| 1962–63 | Yorkshire Football League Division One | 30 | 18 | 4 | 8 | 70 | 34 | 40 | 2nd | QR2 | — | — | — |
| 1963–64 | Yorkshire Football League Division One | 30 | 15 | 6 | 9 | 53 | 29 | 36 | 3rd | QR1 | — | — | — |
| 1964–65 | Yorkshire Football League Division One | 30 | 9 | 7 | 14 | 46 | 55 | 25 | 12th | QR1 | — | — | — |
| 1965–66 | Yorkshire Football League Division One | 30 | 8 | 3 | 19 | 49 | 65 | 19 | 14th | QR2 | — | — | — |
| 1966–67 | Yorkshire Football League Division One↓ | 32 | 1 | 6 | 25 | 34 | 110 | 8 | 17th | QR1 | — | — | — |
| 1967–68 | Yorkshire Football League Division Two | 32 | 5 | 4 | 23 | 31 | 83 | 14 | 17th | — | — | — | — |
| 1968–69 | Yorkshire Football League Division Two | 32 | 7 | 2 | 23 | 42 | 85 | 16 | 16th | — | — | — | — |
| 1969–70 | Yorkshire Football League Division Two↓ | 34 | 12 | 10 | 12 | 40 | 54 | 34 | 10th | — | — | — | — |
| 1970–71 | Yorkshire Football League Division Three | 28 | 8 | 6 | 14 | 34 | 45 | 22 | 12th | — | — | — | — |
| 1971–72 | Yorkshire Football League Division Three↑ | 26 | 15 | 6 | 5 | 54 | 27 | 36 | 2nd | — | — | — | — |
| 1972–73 | Yorkshire Football League Division Two | 30 | 16 | 3 | 11 | 55 | 44 | 35 | 6th | — | — | — | — |
| 1973–74 | Yorkshire Football League Division Two | 30 | 9 | 9 | 12 | 37 | 43 | 27 | 9th | — | — | — | — |
| 1974–75 | Yorkshire Football League Division Two | 28 | 8 | 8 | 12 | 41 | 37 | 24 | 10th | — | — | FA Trophy | QR1 |
| 1975–76 | Yorkshire Football League Division Two | 28 | 5 | 8 | 15 | 30 | 51 | 18 | 12th | — | — | FA Vase | R3 |
| 1976–77 | Yorkshire Football League Division Two | 30 | 9 | 12 | 9 | 45 | 50 | 30 | 10th | — | — | FA Vase | Prelim |
| 1977–78 | Yorkshire Football League Division Two↓ | 28 | 7 | 6 | 15 | 38 | 55 | 20 | 13th | — | — | FA Vase | Prelim |
| 1978–79 | Yorkshire Football League Division Three | 28 | 7 | 6 | 15 | 27 | 55 | 20 | 13th | — | — | FA Vase | Prelim |
| 1979–80 | Yorkshire Football League Division Three | 26 | 11 | 6 | 9 | 44 | 36 | 28 | 6th | — | — | FA Vase | R1 |
| 1980–81 | Yorkshire Football League Division Three↑ | 30 | 20 | 4 | 6 | 64 | 31 | 44 | 2nd | — | — | FA Vase | Prelim |
| 1981–82 | Yorkshire Football League Division Two↑ | 30 | 16 | 8 | 6 | 56 | 29 | 40 | 1st | — | — | FA Vase | Prelim |
| 1982–83 | Northern Counties East Football League Division One North | 26 | 12 | 10 | 4 | 42 | 23 | 34 | 4th | QR2 | — | FA Vase | Prelim |
| 1983–84 | Northern Counties East Football League Division One North | 26 | 12 | 4 | 10 | 43 | 31 | 28 | 7th | QR1 | — | FA Vase | R3 |
| 1984–85 | Northern Counties East Football League Division One North | 32 | 17 | 9 | 6 | 61 | 35 | 60 | 2nd | Prelim | — | FA Vase | Prelim |
| 1985–86 | Northern Counties East Football League Division One↑ | 30 | 16 | 6 | 8 | 65 | 42 | 54 | 3rd | QR1 | — | FA Vase | R1 |
| 1986–87 | Northern Counties East Football League Premier Division↑ | 36 | 14 | 10 | 12 | 48 | 48 | 52 | 9th | QR2 | — | FA Vase | R3 |
| 1987–88 | Northern Premier League Division One | 36 | 13 | 9 | 14 | 51 | 50 | 48 | 10th | QR3 | — | FA Vase | R1 |
| 1988–89 | Northern Premier League Division One | 42 | 19 | 7 | 16 | 68 | 61 | 64 | 8th | QR1 | — | FA Vase | R1 |
| 1989–90 | Northern Premier League Division One | 42 | 17 | 9 | 16 | 68 | 62 | 60 | 9th | Prelim | — | FA Vase | R4 |
| 1990–91 | Northern Premier League Division One | 42 | 11 | 13 | 18 | 55 | 73 | 46 | 19th | QR1 | — | FA Vase | R2 |
| 1991–92 | Northern Premier League Division One | 42 | 14 | 16 | 12 | 73 | 69 | 58 | 10th | QR1 | — | FA Vase | R2 |
| 1992–93 | Northern Premier League Division One | 40 | 14 | 12 | 14 | 77 | 81 | 54 | 10th | QR1 | — | FA Vase | Prelim |
| 1993–94 | Northern Premier League Division One | 40 | 8 | 9 | 23 | 40 | 86 | 33 | 20th | QR2 | — | FA Trophy | QR3 |
| 1994–95 | Northern Premier League Division One | 42 | 14 | 8 | 20 | 57 | 78 | 50 | 13th | QR3 | — | FA Trophy | QR2 |
| 1995–96 | Northern Premier League Division One | 40 | 7 | 10 | 23 | 54 | 96 | 31 | 21st | QR1 | — | FA Trophy | QR1 |
| 1996–97 | Northern Premier League Division One | 42 | 13 | 8 | 21 | 55 | 76 | 47 | 17th | QR1 | — | FA Trophy | QR1 |
| 1997–98 | Northern Premier League Division One | 42 | 8 | 14 | 20 | 57 | 80 | 38 | 19th | QR1 | — | FA Trophy | QR3 |
| 1998–99 | Northern Premier League Division One | 42 | 17 | 7 | 18 | 75 | 77 | 58 | 11th | Prelim | — | FA Trophy | R2 |
| 1999–2000 | Northern Premier League Division One | 42 | 14 | 12 | 16 | 65 | 67 | 54 | 11th | Prelim | — | FA Trophy | R3 |
| 2000–01 | Northern Premier League Division One | 42 | 15 | 10 | 17 | 60 | 70 | 55 | 11th | QR1 | — | FA Trophy | R1 |
| 2001–02 | Northern Premier League Division One↑ | 42 | 25 | 11 | 6 | 80 | 35 | 86 | 1st | QR3 | — | FA Trophy | R3 |
| 2002–03 | Northern Premier League Premier Division | 44 | 21 | 8 | 15 | 75 | 63 | 71 | 6th | R1 | — | FA Trophy | R2 |
| 2003–04 | Northern Premier League Premier Division↑ | 44 | 24 | 5 | 15 | 79 | 63 | 77 | 5th | QR2 | — | FA Trophy | R1 |
| 2004–05 | Football Conference North | 42 | 19 | 11 | 12 | 62 | 49 | 68 | 6th | QR3 | — | FA Trophy | R1 |
| 2005–06 | Football Conference North* | 42 | 22 | 5 | 15 | 66 | 56 | 71 | 5th (Note: Lost to Stafford Rangers 1-0 in playoffs.) | R1 | — | FA Trophy | QR3 |
| 2006–07 | Football Conference North | 42 | 18 | 13 | 11 | 58 | 41 | 67 | 6th | QR4 | — | FA Trophy | R1 |
| 2007–08 | Football Conference North | 42 | 21 | 11 | 10 | 55 | 41 | 74 | 6th | QR4 | — | FA Trophy | QR3 |
| 2008–09 | Football Conference North | 42 | 17 | 10 | 15 | 66 | 57 | 61 | 9th | QR3 | — | FA Trophy | R1 |
| 2009–10 | Football Conference North | 40 | 8 | 6 | 26 | 41 | 80 | 30 | 21st | QR2 | — | FA Trophy | R1 |
| 2010–11 | Football Conference North | 40 | 13 | 11 | 16 | 53 | 66 | 50 | 12th | QR3 | — | FA Trophy | R1 |
| 2011–12 | Football Conference North | 42 | 14 | 10 | 18 | 59 | 69 | 52 | 15th | QR2 | — | FA Trophy | R1 |
| 2012–13 | Football Conference North | 42 | 20 | 9 | 13 | 72 | 50 | 69 | 6th | R2 | — | FA Trophy | R1 |
| 2013–14 | Football Conference North | 42 | 19 | 9 | 14 | 75 | 59 | 63 | 9th | QR2 | — | FA Trophy | QR3 |
| 2014–15 | Football Conference North | 42 | 14 | 10 | 18 | 50 | 62 | 52 | 15th | QR2 | — | FA Trophy | R1 |
| 2015–16 | National League North* | 42 | 21 | 9 | 12 | 73 | 46 | 72 | 4th (Note: Lost to AFC Fylde 2-1 in playoffs.) | QR4 | — | FA Trophy | QR3 |
| 2016–17 | National League North | 42 | 16 | 11 | 15 | 71 | 63 | 59 | 11th | QR4 | — | FA Trophy | R1 |
| 2017–18 | National League North*↑ | 42 | 26 | 7 | 9 | 100 | 49 | 85 | 2nd (Note: Promoted through playoffs defeating Brackley Town 3-0.) | QR4 | — | FA Trophy | R3 |
| 2018–19 | National League* | 46 | 21 | 11 | 14 | 78 | 57 | 74 | 6th (Note: Lost to AFC Fylde 3-1 in playoffs.) | QR4 | — | FA Trophy | R3 |
| 2019–20 | National League*↑ | 37 | 19 | 9 | 9 | 61 | 44 | 66 | 2nd (Note: The season was suspended in March 2020 and later concluded prematurely in June 2020 due to the COVID-19 pandemic, with league positions and promotions decided on a points-per-game basis.) (Note: Promoted through playoffs defeating Notts County 3-1.) | R1 | — | FA Trophy | W (Note: Defeated Concord Rangers 1-0 in final.) |
| 2020–21 | League Two | 46 | 16 | 9 | 21 | 52 | 61 | 57 | 17th | R2 | R2 | EFL Trophy | Group (H) |
| 2021–22 | League Two | 46 | 14 | 11 | 21 | 64 | 75 | 53 | 19th | R3 | R1 (Note: Harrogate Town were drawn against Rochdale A.F.C. in the first round, however Rochdale received a bye following the postponement of the match due to COVID-19 cases in the Harrogate squad.) | EFL Trophy | QF |
| 2022–23 | League Two | 46 | 12 | 16 | 18 | 59 | 68 | 52 | 19th | R2 | R1 | EFL Trophy | Group (A) |
| 2023–24 | League Two | 46 | 17 | 12 | 17 | 60 | 69 | 63 | 13th | R2 | R2 | EFL Trophy | Group (C) |
| 2024–25 | League Two | 46 | 14 | 11 | 21 | 43 | 61 | 53 | 18th | R3 | R2 | EFL Trophy | Group (E) |
| 2025–26 | League Two ↓ | 46 | 10 | 9 | 27 | 39 | 68 | 39 | 23rd | R1 | R1 | EFL Trophy | R3 |
