= List of Glossop North End A.F.C. seasons =

Glossop North End A.F.C. is an English football club based in Glossop, Derbyshire. Former members of the Football League (between 1898 and 1915), the club's first team currently play in the North West Counties League Premier Division. Between 1899 and 1992 the club was known as Glossop.

The club play their home matches at Surrey Street, which has a capacity of 1,301 (200 seated). The team colours are blue, and they are known as the "Hillmen".

== Seasons ==
Season	League										FA Cup	FA Trophy (T) / FA Vase (V)	Other	Top scorer(s)
Season	Division	P	W	D	L	F	A	GD	Pts	Pos	FA Cup	FA Trophy (T) / FA Vase (V)	Other	Top scorer(s)
The club was founded in 1886, but initially only played friendly matches.
1890–91	North Cheshire													
1891–92	North Cheshire	19†	10	3	6	63	38	+25	23	6†/14				
1892–93	North Cheshire													
1893–94	North Cheshire	20	15	2	3	89	30	+59	32	1 /11				
1894–95	Combination	20	14	2	4	49	19	+30	30	2 /11	4Q			
1895–96	Combination	14	9	3	2	33	13	+20	21	3 /8	3Q			
1896–97	Midland	27	15	4	8	67	39	+28	36 (+2)	2 /15	R1			
1897–98	Midland	22	8	2	12	41	47	−6	18	9 /12	3Q			
1898–99	Division 2	34	20	6	8	76	38	+38	46	2P/18	R1			
1899–1900	Division 1	34	4	10	20	31	74	−43	18	18R/18	3Q r			
1900–01	Division 2	34	15	8	11	51	33	+18	38	5 /18	Int			
1901–02	Division 2	34	10	12	12	36	40	−4	32	8 /18	R1			
1902–03	Division 2	34	11	7	16	43	58	−15	29	11 /18	R1			
1903–04	Division 2	34	10	6	18	57	64	−7	26	17 /18	2Q			
1904–05	Division 2	34	10	10	14	37	46	−9	30	12 /18	4Q r3			
1905–06	Division 2	38	10	8	20	49	71	−22	28	16 /20	4Q			
1906–07	Division 2	38	13	6	19	53	79	−26	32	15 /20	R1			
1907–08	Division 2	38	11	8	19	54	74	−20	30	17 /20	R1 r			
1908–09	Division 2	38	15	8	15	57	53	+4	38	8 /20	QF r			
1909–10	Division 2	38	17	7	15	64	57	+7	43	6 /20	R1			
1910–11	Division 2	38	13	8	17	48	62	−14	34	14 /20	R1			
1911–12	Division 2	38	8	12	18	42	56	−14	28	18 /20	R1			
1912–13	Division 2	38	12	8	18	49	68	−19	32	18 /20	R1			
1913–14	Division 2	38	11	6	21	51	67	−16	28	17 /20	R2			
1914–15	Division 2	38	6	6	26	31	87	−56	18	20R/20	R2			
1915–1919 no football played – World War I
1919–20	Lanc Comb	34	15	2	17	59	74	−15	32	13 /18	1Q r			
1920–21	Manchester	21†	12	2	7	33	27	+6	26	2†/13	PR			
1921–22	Manchester	28	12	5	11	49	42	+7	29	5 /15	ExP			
1922–23	Manchester	24†	16	4	4	52	21	+31	36	2†/14	PR		GC: W	
1923–24	Manchester	24†	6	7	11	47	55	−8	19	11†/16	PR			
1924–25	Manchester	30	15	6	9	62	34	+28	36	3 /16	3Q			
1925–26	Manchester	34	18	5	11	97	66	+31	41	7 /18	1Q			
1926–27	Manchester	30	15	5	10	86	83	+3	35	7 /16	1Q			
1927–28	Manchester	32	24	5	3	107	39	+68	53	1 /18	PR			
1928–29	Manchester	28†	18	1	9	73	63	+10	37	5†/18	PR			
1929–30	Manchester	30	17	5	8	76	56	+20	39	4 /16	PR			
1930–31	Manchester	26	13	2	11	76	69	+7	28	6 /14	1Q r2		GC: W	
1931–32	Manchester	24 †	11	4	9	68	54	+14	26	8†/15	PR			
1932–33	Manchester	26	15	6	5	68	49	+19	36	2 /14	PR			
1933–34	Manchester	28	17	3	8	70	58	+12	37	2 /15	2Q			
1934–35	Manchester	32†	23	4	5	97	68	+29	50	1†/19	2Q		GC: W	
1935–36	Manchester	25†	18	1	6	77	33	+44	37	2†/19	4Q			
1936–37	Manchester	30	20	5	5	108	58	+50	45	2 /16	1Q			
1937–38	Manchester	26	16	4	6	71	47	+24	36	3 /14	1Q			
1938–39	Manchester	30	19	3	8	103	56	+47	41	4 /16	PR			
1939–1944 no football played – World War II
1945–46	Manchester	28	16	4	8	92	62	+30	36	4 /15	1Q			
1946–47	Manchester	30†	15	9	6	115	72	+43	39	5†/17	1Q			
1947–48	Manchester	36	18	6	12	113	90	+23	42	5 /19	–			
1948–49	Manchester	32	17	2	13	101	87	+14	36	6 /17	PR		GC: W	
1949–50	Manchester	28	8	7	13	51	58	−7	23	11 /15	PR			
1950–51	Manchester	34	14	3	17	66	77	−11	31	10 /18	PR			
1951–52	Withdrew from the League										PR			
1952–53	Manchester	36	9	2	25	55	115	−60	20	19 /19				
1953–54	Manchester	38	7	8	23	65	118	−53	22	17 /20				
1954–55	Manchester	34	5	7	22	56	146	−90	17	17 /18	–			
1955–56	Manchester	24	10	2	12	68	80	−12	22	7 /13	–			
1956–57	Manchester	26	12	6	8	67	78	−11	30	6 /14	–			
1957–58	Lanc Comb Div 2	38	19	6	13	92	81	+11	44	8 /20	–			
1958–59	Lanc Comb Div 2	34	14	6	14	75	64	+11	34	9 /18	–			
1959–60	Lanc Comb Div 2	34	19	3	12	75	57	+18	41	4 /18	–			
1960–61	Lanc Comb Div 2	34	13	5	16	61	86	−25	31	10 /18	–			
1961–62	Lanc Comb Div 2	36	20	5	11	85	62	+20	45	5 /19	–			
1962–63	Lanc Comb Div 2	38	15	9	14	75	73	+2	39	9 /20	–			
1963–64	Lanc Comb Div 2	34	17	5	12	73	61	+12	39	8 /18	–			
1964–65	Lanc Comb Div 2	32	10	2	20	49	80	−31	22	13 /17	–			
1965–66	Lanc Comb Div 2	26	12	5	9	42	40	+2	29	4 /14	–			
1966–67	Manchester Prem Div	28	14	8	6	68	36	+32	36	3 /15	–			
1967–68	Manchester Prem Div	26	12	5	9	55	47	+8	29	5 /14	–			
1968–69	Manchester Prem Div	24	8	4	12	50	48	+2	20	10 /13	–			
1969–70	Manchester Prem Div	26	9	11	6	49	41	+8	29	6 /14	–			
1970–71	Manchester Prem Div	30	12	8	10	55	44	+11	32	7 /16	–			
1971–72	Manchester Prem Div	32	8	10	14	55	67	−12	26	12 /17	1Q	T: 1Q		
1972–73	Manchester Prem Div	32	16	7	9	52	39	+13	39	6 /17	2Q	T: 1Q		
1973–74	Manchester Prem Div	34	15	7	12	61	56	+5	37	8 /18	1Q	T: 1Q		
1974–75	Manchester Prem Div	34	12	10	12	54	53	+1	34	9 /18	1Q	V: 3R		
1975–76	Manchester Prem Div	34	18	5	11	53	41	+12	41	5 /18	1Q	V: PR		
1976–77	Manchester Prem Div	34	12	10	12	51	47	+4	34	10 /18	1Q	V: 2R		
1977–78	Manchester Prem Div	34	10	8	16	45	54	−9	28	13 /18	1Q	V: PR		
1978–79	Cheshire Div 2	34	6	6	22	42	83	−41	18	17 /18	1Q	V: PR	DSC: SF	
1979–80	Cheshire Div 2	34	14	7	13	53	45	+8	35	7 /18	2Q	V: R2		
1980–81	Cheshire Div 2	38	23	9	6	76	38	+38	55	2P/20	1Q	V: R3	C2C:Fnl	
1981–82	Cheshire Div 1	38	13	19	6	52	30	+22	45	6 /20	1Q	V: R2		
1982–83	NWCFL Div 1	38	6	11	21	29	67	−38	23	18 /20	1Q	T: 2Q		
1983–84	NWCFL Div 1	38	11	11	16	38	61	−23	33	15 /20	3Q	T: 1Q		
1984–85	NWCFL Div 1	38	8	11	19	46	70	−24	27	16 /20	PR	T: 1Q		
1985–86	NWCFL Div 1	38	7	10	21	37	69	−32	24	18 /20	PR	T: PR		
1986–87	NWCFL Div 1	38	5	8	25	33	87	−62	18	20 /20	PR	T: 2Q		
1987–88	NWCFL Div 1	34	5	4	25	30	71	−41	14	18R/18	PR	V: PR		Lee Farrar 12
1988–89	NWCFL Div 2	34	10	7	17	42	60	−18	27	13 /18	PR r	V: PR r		Brian Hennegan 15
1989–90	NWCFL Div 2	30	8	3	19	34	58	−24	27	14 /16	PR	V: PR		Steve Halford 6
1990–91	NWCFL Div 2	34	12	10	12	47	42	+5	46	8 /18	1Q	V: R4 r	N2C:W	Paul Higginbotham 21
1991–92	NWCFL Div 2	34	15	9	10	61	44	+17	54	6p/18	PR	V: R1		Keith Ingham, Gary Davenport 13
1992–93	NWCFL Div 1	42	16	9	17	70	67	+3	54	16 /22	1Q	V: PR		Keith Ingham 25
1993–94	NWCFL Div 1	42	12	8	22	58	86	−28	44	17 /22	1Q r	V: R4		Steve Morgan 26
1994–95	NWCFL Div 1	42	23	8	11	88	59	+29	77	6 /22	1Q r2	V: R3	NFC:SF	Trevor Smallwood 22
1995–96	NWCFL Div 1	42	15	15	12	55	48	+7	60	12 /22	PR	V: R1		Kevin Scarborough 9
1996–97	NWCFL Div 1	42	14	11	17	56	67	−11	53	13 /22	PR	V: 2Q r	MC:W	Steve Morgan 23
1997–98	NWCFL Div 1	42	19	7	16	78	69	+9	64	8 /22	PR r	V: R1	MC:W	Steve Morgan 23
1997–98	NWCFL Div 1	42	19	7	16	78	69	+9	64	8 /22	PR r	V: R1	NLC:SF	Steve Morgan 23
1998–99	NWCFL Div 1	40	12	6	22	53	81	−28	42	16 /21	3Q	V: R1		Kevin O'Connell 20
1999–00	NWCFL Div 1	42	10	11	21	52	73	−21	41	17 /22	PR	V: R4		Darren Hamilton, Steve Heaton 11
2000–01	NWCFL Div 1	42	9	4	29	41	111	−70	31	18 /22	PR	V: R2	DSC:W	Darren Hamilton 7
2001–02	NWCFL Div 1	44	13	7	24	78	105	−27	46	19 /23	PR	V: R1		Elliot Prest 19
2002–03	NWCFL Div 1	42	10	9	23	55	104	−49	39	20 /22	1Q	V: R1		Robert Radcliffe 12
2003–04	NWCFL Div 1	42	9	9	24	51	95	−44	36	18 /22	PR	V: 2Q		Garry Kharas 19
2004–05	NWCFL Div 1	42	15	10	17	79	75	+4	55	13 /22	PR	V: R2 r		Garry Kharas 40
2005–06	NWCFL Div 1	42	12	11	19	62	78	−16	47	16 /22	ExP	V: R2		Garry Kharas 18
2006–07	NWCFL Div 1	42	19	6	17	71	71	0	63	9 /22	2Q	V: 2Q		Lee Blackshaw 19
2007–08	NWCFL Div 1	42	20	5	13	72	46	+26	65	7 /22	PR	V: R1		Darren Hamilton 21
2008–09	NWCFL Prem	42	25	7	10	83	49	+34	82	5 /22	PR	V: Fnl	–	Rick Bailey, Dave Hodges 20
2009–10	NWCFL Prem	42	19	12	11	74	49	+25	69	7 /22	1Q	V: R3		Darren Hamilton 16
2010–11	NWCFL Prem	42	14	11	17	68	55	+13	53	14 /22	1Q	V: R1		Garry Kharas 20
2011–12	NWCFL Prem	42	22	7	13	76	42	+34	73	6 /22	ExP	V: R1		Sam Hind 21
2012–13	NWCFL Prem	42	14	11	17	73	71	+2	53	13 /22	PR	V: 2Q	–	Mark Battersby 25
2013–14	NWCFL Prem	42	25	8	9	73	33	+40	83	3 /22	1Q	V: R2	DSC: Fnl	Tom Bailey 27
2014–15	NWCFL Prem	40	33	3	4	100	23	+77	102	1P/21	2Q	V: Fnl	NLC:W	Jason Carey 31
2015–16	NPL Divi 1N	42	24	9	9	78	41	+37	81	4 /22	1Q	T: PR		Jamie Rainford 31
2016–17	NPL Div 1N	42	21	6	15	72	70	+2	69	8 /22	PR	T: 1Q		Max Leonard 23
2017–18	NPL Div 1N	42	15	8	19	66	72	−6	53	11 /22	PR	T: 3Q		Ben Deegan 13
2018–19	NPL Div 1W	38	7	10	21	41	74	−33	31	17 /20	PR	T: ExP		Jack Tuohy 10
2019–20	NPL Div 1SE	30 ◊	8	9	13	36	45	−9	33	14◊/20	1Q	T: ExP		Porya Ahmadi 13
2020–21	NPL Div 1SE	9 ◊	2	2	5	7	21	-14	8	16◊/20	PR	T: 3Q		Bevan Burey 3
2021–22	NPL Div 1W	38	9	13	16	36	55	-19	40	17 /20	PR	T: 2Q		Jamie Rainford 15
2022–23	NPL Div 1W	38	10	9	19	44	59	-15	39	18R/20	1Q	T: 1Q		Luke Nock 10
2023–24	NWCFL Prem	46	11	10	25	64	83	-19	21	21 /24	ExP	V: 2Q		Jacques Etia 20
2024–25	NWCFL Prem	46	16	9	21	67	77	-10	57	16 /24	PR	V: R1		Lewis Reilly 24
2025–26	NWCFL Prem	46	18	9	19	76	70	6	63	14 /24	ExP	V: 1Q	DSC: Fnl	Ethan Sutcliffe 20
=== Key to contents and abbreviations ===
League record: P – Played; † - Record incomplete; ◊ - Season not completed; W – Games won; D – Games drawn; L – Games lost; F – Goals for; A – Goals against; Pts – Points; Pos – Final position / Teams in division; P – Promoted; p – Promoted (league reorganisation); R – Relegated; † - Record incomplete; ◊ - Season not completed; Leagues: North Cheshire – North Cheshire League; Combination – The Combination; Midland – Midland Football League; Division 1 – Football League First Division; Division 2 – Football League Second Division; Lanc Comb – Lancashire Combination; Manchester – Manchester League; Cheshire – Cheshire County League; NWCFL – North West Counties League; NPL – Northern Premier League; Knock-out competition rounds: ExP – Extra preliminary round; PR – Preliminary round; 1Q – 1st qualifying round; 2Q – 2nd qualifying round; 3Q – 3rd qualifying round; 4Q – 4th qualifying round; R1 – 1st round; R2 – 2nd round; R3 – 3rd round; R4 – 4th round; QF- Quarter final; SF- Semi final; Fnl – Final (runner-up); W – Winner; r – replay; FA Trophy / FA Vase: T – FA Trophy; V - FA Vase; Other competitions: GC – Gilgryst Cup; DSC – Derbyshire Senior Cup; C2C – Cheshire County League Division 2 Cup; N2C – North West Counties League Division 2 Cup; NFC – North West Counties League Floodlit Cup; MC – Manchester Cup; NLC – North West Counties League League Cup
