= 1991–92 North West Counties Football League =

The 1991–92 North West Counties Football League season (known as the Bass North West Counties League for sponsorship reasons) was the tenth in the history of the North West Counties Football League, a football competition in England.

The league comprised two divisions (at levels 8 and 9 of the English football league system) and there were additionally three cup competitions: the League Challenge Cup knockout competition (known as the Raab Karcher Cup for sponsorship reasons for the final occasion this season), open to all the league's clubs; the Second Division Trophy (known as the Lamot Pils Trophy for sponsorship reasons), a knockout trophy competition for Division Two clubs only; and the Floodlit Trophy competition for all the league's clubs with floodlights (known as the Tennents Floodlit Trophy for sponsorship reasons for the first occasion this season). The league also had a reserves team section.

== Division One ==
North West Counties Football League Division One
- Season: 1991–92
- Teams: 18
- Champions: Ashton United
- Promoted: Ashton United; Great Harwood Town
- Relegated: Bootle
- Matches: 306
- Goals: 907 (2.96 per match)

Division One featured featured 18 clubs, 15 remaining from the previous season plus 3 additional (all promoted from Division Two):

- Blackpool Rovers, promoted as runners-up
- Bradford Park Avenue, promoted from third place
- Great Harwood Town, promoted as champions

At the end of the season the top two clubs were promoted to the Northern Premier League Division One: the champions Ashton United automatically and Great Harwood Town (with their second successive promotion) who won a ballot for the additional club required by the Northern Premier League. Two other clubs left the division: the bottom and only relegated club Bootle; and Vauxhall GM who for organisational reasons stepped back from the league and joined the West Cheshire League.

=== League table ===
Pos	Team	Pld	W	D	L	GF	GA	GD	Pts	Season End Notes
1	Ashton United (C, P)	34	24	5	5	61	30	+31	77	Promoted to Northern Premier; League Division One
2	Great Harwood Town (P)	34	22	8	4	68	38	+30	74	Promoted to Northern Premier; League Division One
3	Eastwood Hanley	34	18	9	7	54	35	+19	63	
4	Blackpool Rovers	34	16	7	11	73	57	+16	55	
5	Prescot	34	15	6	13	48	43	+5	51	
6	Penrith	34	15	5	14	57	58	−1	50	
7	Skelmersdale United	34	11	11	12	48	52	−4	44	
8	Flixton	34	11	9	14	46	50	−4	42	
9	Clitheroe	34	11	9	14	44	55	−11	42	
10	Darwen	34	10	11	13	56	55	+1	41	
11	Atherton Laburnum Rovers	34	11	8	15	38	45	−7	41	
12	Nantwich Town	34	11	10	13	44	49	−5	40 (Note: Nantwich Town had three points deducted)	
13	Vauxhall GM	34	10	10	14	42	51	−9	40	Resigned to West Cheshire League
14	Bacup Borough	34	9	11	14	41	45	−4	38	
15	St Helens Town	34	9	9	16	49	55	−6	36	
16	Maine Road	34	9	9	16	40	60	−20	36	
17	Bradford Park Avenue	34	10	5	19	57	68	−11	35	
18	Bootle (R)	34	9	8	17	41	61	−20	35	Relegated to Division Two

Source: NWCFL: Final Tables, Season 1991/92
Rules for classification: 1) points; 2) goal difference; 3) number of goals scored.
(C) Champions; (P) Promoted; (R) Relegated

== Division Two ==
North West Counties Football League Division Two
- Season: 1991–92
- Teams: 18
- Champions: Bamber Bridge
- Promoted: Bamber Bridge; Blackpool Mechanics; Burscough; Chadderton; Glossop; Kidsgrove Athletic; Newcastle Town; Salford City
- Relegated: None
- Matches: 306
- Goals: 991 (3.24 per match)

Division Two featured 18 clubs, 15 remaining from the previous season plus 3 additional:

- Holker Old Boys, joined from the West Lancashire League
- Salford City, relegated from Division One
- Squires Gate, joined from the West Lancashire League

At the end of the season Bamber Bridge and Newcastle Town as the champions and runners-up respectively were promoted to Division One and to expand the higher division to 22 clubs for the next season six further clubs were advanced not solely on the basis of their position in the final table but also having suitable ground grading; these were: Blackpool Mechanics (who finished third), Burscough (fourth), Glossop (sixth), Salford City (seventh), Kidsgrove Athletic (tenth) and Chadderton (eleventh). Bottom placed clubs Ashton Town and Westhoughton Town both conceded in excess of 100 goals over the season (101 and 106 respectively) – although below the historic league highest of 111 (in the 1982–83 season by Darwen and 1988–89 season by Newton) it was the first occasion that two clubs in the same division in the league had conceded treble digit goals in a single season.

=== League table ===
Pos	Team	Pld	W	D	L	GF	GA	GD	Pts	Season End Notes
1	Bamber Bridge (C, P)	34	25	3	6	97	39	+58	78	Promoted to Division One
2	Newcastle Town (P)	34	23	6	5	69	26	+43	75	Promoted to Division One
3	Blackpool Mechanics (P)	34	20	9	5	75	34	+41	69	Promoted to Division One
4	Burscough (P)	34	19	7	8	82	46	+36	64	Promoted to Division One
5	Formby	34	17	5	12	49	39	+10	56	
6	Glossop (P)	34	15	9	10	61	44	+17	54	Promoted to Division One
7	Salford City (P)	34	14	9	11	57	41	+16	51	Promoted to Division One
8	Castleton Gabriels	34	14	9	11	54	43	+11	51	
9	Cheadle Town	34	15	6	13	53	50	+3	51	
10	Kidsgrove Athletic (P)	34	14	7	13	44	45	−1	49	Promoted to Division One
11	Chadderton (P)	34	14	6	14	50	48	+2	48	Promoted to Division One
12	Oldham Town	34	11	8	15	49	62	−13	41	
13	Atherton Collieries	34	12	4	18	51	64	−13	40	
14	Squires Gate	34	11	5	18	45	60	−15	38	
15	Holker Old Boys	34	10	6	18	37	53	−16	36	
16	Maghull	34	7	2	25	38	90	−52	23	
17	Ashton Town	34	4	7	23	47	101	−54	19	
18	Westhoughton Town	34	5	4	25	33	106	−73	19	

Source: NWCFL: Final Tables, Season 1991/92
Rules for classification: 1) points; 2) goal difference; 3) number of goals scored.
(C) Champions; (P) Promoted

== League Challenge Cup ==
The 1991–92 League Challenge Cup (known as the Raab Karcher Cup for sponsorship reasons for the final occasion this season) was a knockout competition open to all the league's clubs. The final, played at Bury F.C., was won by Division One club Ashton United who, as part of a league and cup double, defeated Burscough of Division Two 1–0.

Semi-finals and Final

The semi-finals were decided on aggregate score from two legs played

Semi-finals
Ashton United (D1)	1	3	4
Castleton Gabriels (D2)	1	0	1
Burscough (D2)	2	1 (Note: After extra time; score at 90 minutes: 1–3)	3 (Note: Burscough won on the away goal rule)
Eastwood Hanley (D1)	0	3	3

Final (Note: Played at Bury F.C.)
Ashton United (D1)	1
Burscough (D2)	0

Club's division appended to team name: (D1)=Division One; (D2)=Division Two
sources:

- Semi-finals: "Castleton legged up by Ashton". Rochdale Observer. Rochdale. 15 April 1992. p. 16.; "Tigger's a wonderful thing". Ormskirk Advertiser. Ormskirk. 16 April 1992. p. 13.
- Final: "(column 5) Ashton Utd 1 Burscough 0". Liverpool Daily Post. Liverpool. 1 May 1992. p. 42.

== Second Division Trophy ==
The 1991–92 Second Division Trophy (known as the Lamot Pils Trophy for sponsorship reasons) was a knockout competition for Division Two clubs only. Newcastle Town defeated Atherton Collieries 2–0 in extra time (0–0 at 90 minutes) in the final played at Ashton United F.C.

Semi-finals and Final

The semi-finals were decided on aggregate score from two legs played

Semi-finals
Cheadle Town	0	1	1
Atherton Collieries	1	1	2
Newcastle Town	0	2	2
Chadderton	0	0	0

Final (Note: Played at Ashton United F.C.)
Atherton Collieries	0 (Note: After extra time, score at 90 minutes: 0–0)
Newcastle Town	2

sources:

- Semi-finals: "Results, scorers, attendences: Saturday: Lamot Pils Trophy semi-final 1st leg". Manchester Evening News: Pink Final. Manchester. 11 April 1992. p. 22.; "Results, scorers, attendences: Saturday:Lamot Pils Trophy semi-final 2nd leg". Manchester Evening News: Pink Final. Manchester. 18 April 1992. p. 22.
- Final: "Newcastle Town win Lamot Pils Trophy". Evening Sentinel. Stoke-on-Trent. 7 May 1992. p. 32.

== Floodlit Trophy ==
The 1991–92 Floodlit Trophy (known as the Tennents Floodlit Trophy for sponsorship reasons for the first occasion) was a competition open to all the league's clubs with floodlights. The first phase took place in groups; the final was held at Wigan Athletic F.C. and was won by Division One club Great Harwood Town who defeated Bamber Bridge of Division Two 1–0.

== Reserves Section ==
Main honours for the 1991–92 season:

- Reserves Division
  - Winners: Flixton Reserves
  - Runners-up: Chadderton Reserves
- Reserves Division Cup
  - Winners: Chadderton Reserves
  - Runners-up: Flixton Reserves
