= 1994–95 North West Counties Football League =

The 1994–95 North West Counties Football League season (known as the Carling North West Counties League for sponsorship reasons for the final occasion) was the 13th in the history of the North West Counties Football League, a football competition in England.

The league comprised two divisions, Division One and Division Two (at levels 8 and 9 respectively of the English football league system), and there were additionally three cup competitions: the League Challenge Cup knockout competition (known as the Carling League Cup for sponsorship reasons), open to all the league's clubs; the Second Division Trophy (known as the Lamot Pils Trophy for sponsorship reasons for the final occasion after six seasons), a knockout trophy competition for Division Two clubs only; and the Floodlit Trophy competition (known for sponsorship reasons as the Tennents Floodlit Trophy) for all the league's clubs with floodlights. The league also had a reserves team section.

== Division One ==
North West Counties Football League Division One
- Season: 1994–95
- Teams: 22
- Champions: Bradford Park Avenue
- Promoted: Bradford Park Avenue
- Relegated: Bacup Borough
- Matches: 462
- Goals: 1,579 (3.42 per match)

Division One featured 22 clubs, 20 remaining from the previous season plus 2 additions, both promoted from Division Two:

- Holker Old Boys, promoted from third place
- Trafford, promoted as runners-up

North Trafford changed their name to Trafford

At the end of the season the champions Bradford Park Avenue were automatically promoted to the Northern Premier League Division One. The season created a divisional record for the highest to date average goals per match at 3.42 (the previous highest for Division One being 3.12 from the 1983–84 season); it was the first occasion that two Division One clubs had scored in excess of 100 goals in a single season, second placed Clitheroe with 104 and eight placed Burscough with 102 – the latter also created a league first in scoring greater than 100 league goals for two successive seasons. As only one club was eligible (owing to ground grading) for promotion into this division next season only one club, Bacup Borough, were relegated.

=== League table ===
Pos	Team	Pld	W	D	L	GF	GA	GD	Pts	Season End Notes
1	Bradford Park Avenue (C, P)	42	30	4	8	96	43	+53	94	Promoted to Northern Premier; League Division One
2	Clitheroe	42	27	9	6	104	49	+55	90	
3	St Helens Town	42	27	8	7	86	42	+44	89	
4	Trafford	42	27	5	10	98	50	+48	86	
5	Newcastle Town	42	24	7	11	75	57	+18	79	
6	Glossop North End	42	23	8	11	88	59	+29	77	
7	Blackpool Rovers	42	22	7	13	81	64	+17	73	
8	Burscough	42	19	15	8	102	65	+37	72	
9	Prescot	42	16	8	18	47	47	0	56	
10	Penrith	42	16	7	19	72	72	0	55	
11	Chadderton	42	15	7	20	56	70	−14	52	
12	Maine Road	42	14	9	19	69	83	−14	51	
13	Eastwood Hanley	42	14	8	20	75	81	−6	50	
14	Holker Old Boys	42	13	11	18	61	69	−8	50	
15	Kidsgrove Athletic	42	14	8	20	66	78	−12	50	
16	Nantwich Town	42	14	7	21	85	83	+2	49	
17	Darwen	42	14	5	23	65	82	−17	47	
18	Rossendale United	42	12	11	19	60	82	−22	47	
19	Bootle	42	11	10	21	46	68	−22	43	
20	Skelmersdale United	42	10	7	25	67	118	−51	37	
21	Salford City	42	9	9	24	45	85	−40	36	
22	Bacup Borough (R)	42	3	6	33	35	132	−97	15	Relegated to Division Two

Source: NWCFL: Final Tables, Season 1994/95
Rules for classification: 1) points; 2) goal difference; 3) number of goals scored.
(C) Champions; (P) Promoted; (R) Relegated

== Division Two ==
North West Counties Football League Division Two
- Season: 1994–95
- Teams: 16
- Champions: Flixton
- Promoted: Flixton
- Relegated: None
- Matches: 240
- Goals: 964 (4.02 per match)

Division Two featured 16 clubs, 14 remaining from the previous season plus 2 additions:

- Flixton, relegated from Division One
- Tetley Walker, joined from the Warrington and District League

For the third successive season there was an increase in the average goals scored per match in Division Two with it increasing from the previous season's 3.68 to a new all time league high of 4.02 per match (the only occasion to exceed 4).

At the end of the season the champions Flixton, who had been relegated into the division this season, were the only club promoted to Division One: neither second placed Oldham Town or third placed Tetley Walker were promoted as their grounds were adjudged not of the required standard for Division One. The other club leaving the division after the season were Irlam Town who folded. For the second successive season Squires Gate finished bottom of the division again conceding in excess of 100 league goals and this season they created a Division Two record for league goals conceded with 114, exceeding the previous high of 111 by Newton in the 1988–89 season.

=== League table ===
Pos	Team	Pld	W	D	L	GF	GA	GD	Pts	Season End Notes
1	Flixton (C, P)	30	21	6	3	98	32	+66	69	Promoted to Division One
2	Oldham Town	30	20	6	4	83	34	+49	66	
3	Tetley Walker	30	18	5	7	75	46	+29	59	
4	Atherton Collieries	30	18	4	8	67	41	+26	58	
5	Stantondale	30	18	3	9	58	43	+15	57	
6	Nelson	30	13	8	9	64	44	+20	47	
7	Haslingden	30	14	4	12	76	64	+12	46	
8	Blackpool Mechanics	30	12	8	10	72	57	+15	44	
9	Maghull	30	11	8	11	58	46	+12	41	
10	Formby	30	11	6	13	57	53	+4	39	
11	Cheadle Town	30	10	7	13	48	52	−4	37	
12	Castleton Gabriels	30	9	9	12	56	75	−19	36	
13	Daisy Hill	30	6	8	16	53	73	−20	26	
14	Ashton Town	30	6	2	22	39	92	−53	20	
15	Irlam Town	30	5	3	22	30	98	−68	18	Club folded
16	Squires Gate	30	2	5	23	30	114	−84	11	

Source: NWCFL: Final Tables, Season 1994/95
Rules for classification: 1) points; 2) goal difference; 3) number of goals scored.
(C) Champions; (P) Promoted

== League Challenge Cup ==
The 1994–95 League Challenge Cup (known as the Carling League Cup for sponsorship reasons) was a knockout competition open to all the league's clubs. The final, played at Bury F.C., between Division One clubs was won by Nantwich Town who defeated Trafford 1–0.

Semi-finals and Final

The semi-finals were decided on aggregate score from two legs played

Semi-finals
Prescot (D1)	0	0	0
Nantwich Town (D1)	0	1	1
Tetley Walker (D2)	0	0	0
Trafford (D1)	0	1	1

Final (Note: Played at Bury F.C.)
Nantwich Town (D1)	1
Trafford (D1)	0

Club's division appended to team name: (D1)=Division One; (D2)=Division Two
sources:

- Semi-finals: "Semi-pro soccer round-up: Carling Lge Cup semi final 2nd leg". Manchester Evening News. Manchester. 10 April 1995. p. 45.
- Final: "Scarlett sparks cup fever". The Chronicle (Nantwich edition). Chester. 3 May 1995. p. 34.

== Second Division Trophy ==
The 1994–95 Second Division Trophy (known as the Lamot Pils Trophy for sponsorship reasons for the final occasion after six seasons) was a knockout competition for Division Two clubs only. The winners were Formby who defeated Flixton (who were therefore denied a Division Two league and cup double) 2–1 in the final played at Burscough F.C.

Semi-finals and Final

The semi-finals were decided on aggregate score from two legs played

Semi-finals
Tetley Walker	0	3	3
Flixton	2	3	5
Stantondale	1	1 (Note: After extra time, score at 90 minutes: 1–0)	2
Formby	2	0	2 (Note: Formby won on the away goal rule)

Final (Note: Played at Burscough F.C.)
Flixton	1
Formby	2

sources:

- Semi-finals: "Last Night's results: Carling NW Co's: Lamot Pils Trophy, Semi-final 2nd leg". Manchester Evening News. Manchester. 15 February 1995. p. 61.; "Defeated Formby go through". Daily Post. Liverpool. 8 April 1995. p. 29.
- Final: Paul Lawler (6 April 1995). "Formby's Trophy triumph". Formby Times. Liverpool. p. 48.

== Floodlit Trophy ==
The 1994–95 Floodlit Trophy (known for sponsorship reasons as the Tennents Floodlit Trophy) was a competition open to all the league's clubs with floodlights. In the final played at Blackpool Mechanics F.C. Division One club Penrith defeated Atherton Collieries of Division Two.

== Reserves Section ==
Main honours for the 1994–95 season:

- Reserves Division
  - Winners: St Helens Town Reserves
  - Runners-up: Oldham Town Reserves
- Reserves Division Cup
  - Winners: Oldham Town Reserves
  - Runners-up: Salford City Reserves
