= 1992–93 Northern Premier League =

The 1992–93 Northern Premier League season was the 25th in the history of the Northern Premier League, a football competition in England. Teams were divided into two divisions; the Premier Division, won by Southport and the First Division, won by Bridlington Town. It was known as the HFS Loans League for sponsorship reasons.

== Premier Division ==
Northern Premier League Premier Division
- Season: 1992–93
- Champions: Southport
- Promoted: Southport
- Relegated: Goole Town; Mossley
- Matches: 462
- Goals: 1,517 (3.28 per match)

The Premier Division featured three new teams:

- Barrow relegated from the Football Conference
- Colwyn Bay promoted as champions from Division One
- Winsford United promoted as runners-up from Division One

=== League table ===
Pos	Team	Pld	W	D	L	GF	GA	GD	Pts	Promotion or relegation
1	Southport (C, P)	42	29	9	4	103	31	+72	96	Promotion to Football Conference
2	Winsford United	42	27	9	6	91	43	+48	90	
3	Morecambe	42	25	11	6	93	51	+42	86	
4	Marine	42	26	8	8	83	47	+36	86	
5	Leek Town	42	21	11	10	86	51	+35	74	
6	Accrington Stanley	42	20	13	9	79	45	+34	73	
7	Frickley Athletic	42	21	6	15	62	52	+10	69	
8	Barrow	42	18	11	13	71	55	+16	65	
9	Hyde United	42	17	13	12	87	71	+16	64	
10	Bishop Auckland	42	17	11	14	63	52	+11	62	
11	Gainsborough Trinity	42	17	8	17	63	66	−3	59	
12	Colwyn Bay	42	16	6	20	80	79	+1	54	
13	Horwich RMI	42	14	10	18	72	79	−7	52	
14	Buxton	42	13	10	19	60	75	−15	49	
15	Matlock Town	42	13	11	18	56	79	−23	47 (Note: Matlock Town were docked 3 points)	
16	Emley	42	13	6	23	62	91	−29	45	
17	Whitley Bay	42	11	8	23	57	96	−39	41	
18	Chorley	42	10	10	22	52	93	−41	40	
19	Fleetwood Town	42	10	7	25	50	77	−27	37	
20	Droylsden	42	10	7	25	47	84	−37	37	
21	Mossley (R)	42	7	8	27	53	95	−42	29	Relegation to NPL Division One
22	Goole Town (R)	42	6	9	27	47	105	−58	27	Relegation to NPL Division One

Updated to match(es) played on May 1993. Source: .
Rules for classification: 1) points; 2) goal difference; 3) number of goals scored.
(C) Champions; (P) Promoted; (R) Relegated

=== Results ===
Home \ Away	ACC	BRW	BIS	BUX	CHO	COL	DRO	EML	FLE	FRK	GAI	GOO	HOR	HYD	LEE	MAR	MAT	MOR	MOS	SOU	WHI	WNS
Accrington Stanley		2–0	0–0	2–2	3–1	3–1	4–1	6–1	1–0	1–1	0–1	3–0	2–1	1–1	2–0	1–1	2–0	1–1	2–2	2–2	2–0	1–3
Barrow	2–0		4–3	3–2	2–1	5–0	3–0	0–1	2–0	1–2	2–2	4–1	1–1	2–1	1–2	3–1	1–0	0–3	2–2	0–2	0–1	0–0
Bishop Auckland	0–0	2–1		0–0	5–0	1–1	2–0	2–1	0–1	0–3	2–2	1–1	1–0	3–0	1–0	1–0	0–1	2–2	4–0	1–3	3–2	2–2
Buxton	0–1	0–4	0–3		2–3	1–0	1–2	3–0	0–3	2–0	2–3	2–1	2–2	2–1	2–1	1–5	1–1	4–1	6–1	0–2	0–0	2–3
Chorley	0–1	1–1	0–0	1–1		4–2	2–0	1–3	2–1	1–2	1–0	1–5	2–2	3–3	2–1	0–6	1–1	1–2	4–2	1–6	1–4	0–4
Colwyn Bay	0–1	2–3	1–2	7–3	1–0		3–0	2–1	3–1	0–1	3–0	4–2	4–2	2–4	2–3	2–2	3–1	0–1	2–1	2–4	4–4	2–3
Droylsden	3–3	1–3	1–1	0–0	2–2	1–1		1–2	1–1	2–1	0–2	1–0	1–3	1–0	0–1	1–3	2–0	0–1	1–4	2–5	1–2	0–4
Emley	0–3	1–1	2–3	1–1	2–1	1–1	1–3		4–3	2–0	0–2	1–2	5–3	1–5	5–5	4–1	2–2	1–2	2–0	0–4	2–1	1–2
Fleetwood Town	0–2	2–2	0–1	0–2	1–1	1–2	1–6	3–1		1–1	1–2	3–1	1–1	1–2	3–0	3–1	2–3	1–2	3–2	1–2	2–2	1–2
Frickley Athletic	3–2	2–1	3–0	2–0	2–1	1–0	0–1	3–1	1–2		4–0	3–0	2–1	1–1	1–2	0–0	1–0	2–0	2–1	2–5	3–0	1–2
Gainsborough Trinity	0–2	1–0	1–1	1–2	1–1	2–1	2–1	1–0	1–0	0–1		3–0	2–2	2–0	1–4	0–1	2–4	2–3	1–1	1–1	7–1	3–1
Goole Town	0–5	1–0	1–0	0–2	0–2	3–1	1–2	0–0	0–0	1–3	1–4		1–2	1–1	0–1	2–3	0–4	2–8	1–1	0–5	5–1	2–4
Horwich RMI	2–2	0–2	2–1	3–0	2–1	0–2	2–1	1–3	2–1	3–1	2–0	3–1		3–5	1–1	0–3	2–4	0–1	5–2	1–1	3–3	2–0
Hyde United	2–6	2–2	3–1	2–2	4–0	3–1	2–1	1–0	3–1	0–0	7–2	3–3	4–1		2–4	1–2	2–0	2–2	4–2	1–1	2–1	3–3
Leek Town	3–1	2–2	2–3	5–1	3–0	1–4	2–1	2–0	4–1	4–0	1–2	6–1	0–0	3–3		0–1	6–0	0–0	3–3	1–0	3–0	0–0
Marine	2–0	2–2	2–0	1–3	1–0	2–1	2–1	2–0	2–0	2–0	2–1	6–3	3–0	3–1	1–1		2–2	0–3	1–0	2–1	3–1	2–0
Matlock Town	1–2	0–1	1–5	1–0	3–1	1–1	2–2	2–1	0–1	2–1	2–1	3–3	3–2	0–1	1–2	1–0		0–6	0–3	1–5	1–2	3–3
Morecambe	2–0	3–1	2–1	2–1	2–0	3–1	2–0	7–4	4–2	3–0	3–4	1–1	3–2	3–3	1–1	1–1	2–2		3–1	0–2	4–2	0–0
Mossley	0–5	1–2	3–1	2–3	1–4	1–4	0–1	1–2	2–0	1–2	2–1	0–0	1–4	1–2	0–4	0–3	0–0	1–0		0–2	5–0	2–4
Southport	2–2	3–0	1–0	2–1	7–1	2–0	3–0	1–2	5–0	2–1	0–0	3–0	3–2	1–0	0–0	0–0	3–0	1–1	3–0		1–0	0–1
Whitley Bay	1–1	1–1	1–4	2–0	2–2	2–4	5–0	2–0	0–1	3–2	3–0	2–0	0–1	1–0	0–2	1–5	2–3	0–3	1–1	1–5		0–3
Winsford United	2–0	1–4	2–0	1–1	0–1	3–2	5–2	5–1	2–0	1–1	1–0	3–0	3–1	1–0	2–0	5–1	0–0	2–0	1–0	1–2	6–0	

Updated to match(es) played on 1 May 1993. Source: Northern Premier Division results grid
Legend: Blue = home team win; Yellow = draw; Red = away team win.

== Division One ==
Northern Premier League Division One
- Season: 1992–93
- Champions: Bridlington Town
- Promoted: Bridlington Town; Knowsley United
- Relegated: Rossendale United; Shepshed Albion
- Matches: 420
- Goals: 1,412 (3.36 per match)

Division One featured four new teams:

- Ashton United promoted as champions of the NWCFL Division One
- Great Harwood Town promoted as runners-up of the NWCFL Division One
- Gretna promoted as champions of the Northern League Division One
- Shepshed Albion relegated from the Premier Division

The Shepshed Charterhouse Renamed to Shepshed Albion before this season.

=== League table ===
Pos	Team	Pld	W	D	L	GF	GA	GD	Pts	Promotion or relegation
1	Bridlington Town (C, P)	40	25	11	4	84	35	+49	86	Promotion to Premier Division
2	Knowsley United (P)	40	23	7	10	86	48	+38	76	Promotion to Premier Division
3	Ashton United	40	22	8	10	81	54	+27	74	
4	Guiseley	40	20	10	10	90	64	+26	70	
5	Warrington Town	40	19	10	11	85	57	+28	67	
6	Gretna	40	17	12	11	64	47	+17	63	
7	Curzon Ashton	40	16	15	9	69	63	+6	63	
8	Great Harwood Town	40	17	9	14	66	57	+9	60	
9	Harrogate Town	40	14	12	14	77	81	−4	54	
10	Alfreton Town	40	15	9	16	80	80	0	54	
11	Worksop Town	40	15	9	16	66	70	−4	54	
12	Radcliffe Borough	40	13	14	13	66	69	−3	53	
13	Workington	40	13	13	14	51	61	−10	52	
14	Eastwood Town	40	13	11	16	49	52	−3	50	
15	Netherfield	40	11	14	15	68	63	+5	47	
16	Caernarfon Town	40	13	8	19	66	74	−8	47	
17	Farsley Celtic	40	12	8	20	64	77	−13	44	
18	Lancaster City	40	10	12	18	49	76	−27	42	
19	Shepshed Albion (R)	40	9	12	19	46	66	−20	39	Relegation to Midland Combination Premier Division
20	Congleton Town	40	10	7	23	58	95	−37	37	
21	Rossendale United (R)	40	5	5	30	50	126	−76	20	Relegation to NWCFL Division One

Updated to match(es) played on May 1993. Source: .
Rules for classification: 1) points; 2) goal difference; 3) number of goals scored.
(C) Champions; (P) Promoted; (R) Relegated

== Promotion and relegation ==
In the twenty-fifth season of the Northern Premier League Southport (as champions) were automatically promoted to the Football Conference. Mossley and Goole Town were relegated to the First Division; these three clubs were replaced by relegated Conference side Boston United, First Division winners Bridlington Town and second placed Knowsley United. In the First Division Shepshed Albion and Rossendale United left the League at the end of the season and were replaced by newly admitted Spennymoor United and Bamber Bridge.

== Cup Results ==
Challenge Cup:

- Winsford United bt. Warrington Town

President's Cup:

- Winsford United bt. Southport

Northern Premier League Shield: Between Champions of NPL Premier Division and Winners of the Presidents Cup.

- Southport bt. Winsford United
