= 1994–95 Northern Premier League =

The 1994–95 Northern Premier League season was the 27th in the history of the Northern Premier League, a football competition in England. Teams were divided into two divisions; the Premier and the First. It was known as the Unibond League for sponsorship reasons.

== Premier Division ==
Northern Premier League Premier Division
- Season: 1994–95
- Champions: Marine
- Promoted: Morecambe
- Relegated: Horwich RMI; Whitley Bay
- Matches: 462
- Goals: 1,475 (3.19 per match)

The Premier Division featured three new teams:

- Guiseley promoted as champions of Division One
- Spennymoor United promoted as runners-up from Division One
- Witton Albion relegated from the Football Conference

=== League table ===
Pos	Team	Pld	W	D	L	GF	GA	GD	Pts	Promotion or relegation
1	Marine (C)	42	29	11	2	83	27	+56	98 (Note: Marine were not promoted due to ground grading standards.)	
2	Morecambe (P)	42	28	10	4	99	34	+65	94	Promotion to Football Conference
3	Guiseley	42	28	9	5	96	50	+46	93	
4	Hyde United	42	22	10	10	89	59	+30	76	
5	Boston United	42	20	11	11	80	43	+37	71	
6	Spennymoor United	42	20	11	11	66	52	+14	71	
7	Buxton	42	18	9	15	65	62	+3	63	
8	Gainsborough Trinity	42	16	13	13	69	61	+8	61	
9	Bishop Auckland	42	16	12	14	68	55	+13	57 (Note: Bishop Auckland were docked 3 points.)	
10	Witton Albion	42	14	14	14	54	56	−2	56	
11	Barrow	42	17	5	20	68	71	−3	56	
12	Colwyn Bay	42	16	8	18	71	80	−9	56	
13	Emley	42	14	13	15	62	68	−6	55	
14	Matlock Town	42	15	5	22	62	72	−10	50	
15	Accrington Stanley	42	12	13	17	55	77	−22	49	
16	Knowsley United	42	11	14	17	64	83	−19	47	
17	Winsford United	42	10	11	21	56	75	−19	41	
18	Chorley	42	11	7	24	64	87	−23	40	
19	Frickley Athletic	42	10	10	22	53	79	−26	40	
20	Droylsden	42	10	8	24	56	93	−37	38	
21	Whitley Bay (R)	42	8	8	26	46	97	−51	32	Relegation to NPL Division One
22	Horwich RMI (Note: From the next season Horwich RMI were renamed as Leigh RMI.) (R)	42	9	4	29	49	94	−45	31	Relegation to NPL Division One

Updated to match(es) played on May 1995. Source: .
Rules for classification: 1) points; 2) goal difference; 3) number of goals scored.
(C) Champions; (P) Promoted; (R) Relegated

=== Results ===
Home \ Away	ACC	BRW	BIS	BOS	BUX	CHO	COL	DRO	EML	FRK	GAI	GUI	HOR	HYD	KNO	MAR	MAT	MOR	SPU	WHI	WNS	WTN
Accrington Stanley		5–2	1–4	0–4	1–0	1–1	1–3	2–1	1–1	1–1	1–2	1–4	3–0	1–0	2–2	1–5	0–2	0–4	0–1	4–1	2–2	1–2
Barrow	2–2		2–1	2–5	4–2	2–1	5–0	1–1	1–0	1–2	1–0	2–3	1–0	1–1	2–3	0–3	3–1	0–1	1–1	4–0	2–1	0–1
Bishop Auckland	2–0	3–0		0–0	2–2	2–2	3–3	0–1	2–2	2–0	1–1	0–1	2–1	0–2	0–2	0–1	3–1	0–3	0–0	2–2	2–1	0–1
Boston United	4–2	3–1	1–2		0–1	2–0	5–2	5–1	1–2	5–0	2–2	2–2	4–0	2–1	6–1	1–1	2–0	0–2	2–3	2–1	0–0	1–1
Buxton	0–1	1–0	2–2	0–0		1–2	4–2	2–2	0–1	3–2	0–4	3–2	4–0	1–2	1–0	0–2	4–0	1–2	3–0	2–1	1–1	1–1
Chorley	1–2	3–1	1–1	0–1	0–1		3–2	2–4	2–3	2–3	0–2	2–4	2–3	1–0	3–1	1–4	0–1	1–4	1–2	1–4	2–0	0–2
Colwyn Bay	3–3	1–2	1–3	0–1	1–2	3–2		3–2	3–0	1–2	0–0	2–4	3–1	1–0	1–1	0–1	0–4	0–0	2–1	5–1	1–0	2–2
Droylsden	1–3	1–0	1–4	1–0	1–2	0–0	1–3		0–0	2–1	2–6	1–3	2–1	3–3	1–3	1–4	3–2	3–2	1–2	0–1	5–1	0–2
Emley	0–0	2–1	1–4	1–4	2–0	1–4	1–0	3–1		2–0	3–2	1–0	1–1	1–3	3–3	0–0	0–1	0–0	5–1	4–0	1–1	0–0
Frickley Athletic	1–1	1–2	2–2	1–1	1–1	3–3	1–2	2–0	3–2		1–2	2–1	1–2	1–2	2–2	0–1	0–1	1–4	0–2	1–5	3–0	2–2
Gainsborough Trinity	0–1	4–3	2–2	2–0	0–2	3–2	6–1	2–2	3–0	1–1		0–1	1–0	1–1	2–1	0–0	3–2	0–0	0–3	2–2	1–1	1–0
Guiseley	4–0	2–1	2–1	2–1	3–1	2–1	3–2	2–0	2–0	2–1	1–0		1–2	3–3	5–0	2–1	3–0	2–2	1–1	6–3	5–1	1–1
Horwich RMI	1–5	1–6	0–2	0–4	4–1	6–0	0–1	2–2	4–4	0–3	2–1	0–2		0–1	1–2	1–4	0–3	0–2	0–0	2–3	1–0	0–1
Hyde United	4–1	3–1	1–0	1–0	4–2	2–3	4–3	5–2	1–1	6–0	5–1	1–2	2–1		3–0	1–2	6–3	1–4	1–1	3–0	1–2	2–1
Knowsley United	0–0	0–2	2–3	2–2	1–3	1–2	2–2	3–0	4–2	0–3	4–2	2–1	2–1	1–2		1–1	0–0	1–1	2–0	3–0	0–5	1–4
Marine	2–1	4–0	2–0	2–1	1–1	3–1	1–0	4–1	2–1	2–0	1–4	1–1	2–0	1–1	1–0		3–0	2–1	1–0	2–0	2–1	4–1
Matlock Town	0–1	1–1	4–0	0–1	2–1	2–2	1–2	3–2	5–1	0–2	2–1	2–3	3–2	0–1	3–3	0–0		0–2	1–2	5–1	0–3	0–1
Morecambe	3–0	1–3	1–0	2–1	1–1	2–0	1–1	4–0	2–1	3–1	4–0	2–2	7–1	1–3	1–1	0–0	5–0		3–2	2–0	6–1	5–2
Spennymoor United	5–1	0–1	1–0	1–1	4–1	2–2	5–2	2–1	2–1	2–0	1–1	1–1	2–1	1–1	2–1	0–3	2–1	1–3		4–0	1–1	2–1
Whitley Bay	0–0	3–1	1–4	0–1	1–3	2–1	0–2	0–1	0–3	2–2	2–2	0–1	0–3	2–2	5–3	0–4	0–2	0–2	1–0		0–1	1–1
Winsford United	2–2	3–0	0–4	1–2	1–2	1–3	0–1	2–1	2–3	2–0	2–0	2–2	2–3	5–1	2–2	2–2	2–4	0–2	1–2	1–1		1–0
Witton Albion	0–0	0–3	1–3	0–0	1–2	1–4	1–4	1–1	2–2	2–0	1–2	1–2	2–1	2–2	1–1	1–1	2–0	1–2	2–1	3–0	2–0	

Updated to match(es) played on 6 May 1995. Source: Northern Premier Division results grid
Legend: Blue = home team win; Yellow = draw; Red = away team win.

== Division One ==
Northern Premier League Division One
- Season: 1994–95
- Champions: Blyth Spartans
- Promoted: Bamber Bridge; Blyth Spartans
- Relegated: Goole Town; Mossley
- Matches: 462
- Goals: 1,521 (3.29 per match)

Division One featured three new teams:

- Atherton Laburnum Rovers promoted as champions of the NWCFL Division One
- Blyth Spartans promoted as runners-up of the Northern League Division One
- Fleetwood relegated from the Premier Division

=== League table ===
Pos	Team	Pld	W	D	L	GF	GA	GD	Pts	Promotion or relegation
1	Blyth Spartans (C, P)	42	26	9	7	95	55	+40	87	Promotion to Premier Division
2	Bamber Bridge (P)	42	25	10	7	101	51	+50	85	Promotion to Premier Division
3	Warrington Town	42	25	9	8	74	40	+34	84	
4	Alfreton Town	42	25	7	10	94	49	+45	82	
5	Lancaster City	42	23	10	9	81	44	+37	79	
6	Worksop Town	42	19	14	9	95	68	+27	71	
7	Radcliffe Borough	42	18	10	14	76	70	+6	64	
8	Ashton United	42	18	8	16	80	70	+10	62	
9	Netherfield	42	17	7	18	54	56	−2	58	
10	Eastwood Town	42	14	13	15	67	61	+6	55	
11	Gretna	42	14	13	15	64	66	−2	55	
12	Atherton Laburnum Rovers	42	14	8	20	60	67	−7	50	
13	Harrogate Town	42	14	8	20	57	78	−21	50	
14	Caernarfon Town	42	13	10	19	59	62	−3	49	Transferred to the League of Wales
15	Curzon Ashton	42	10	16	16	64	80	−16	46	
16	Great Harwood Town	42	11	13	18	66	87	−21	46	
17	Congleton Town	42	11	13	18	52	75	−23	46	
18	Fleetwood	42	12	11	19	51	74	−23	44 (Note: Fleetwood Town were docked 3 points.)	
19	Farsley Celtic	42	12	7	23	66	100	−34	43	
20	Workington	42	12	6	24	61	91	−30	42	
21	Goole Town (R)	42	11	7	24	46	81	−35	40	Relegation to NCEFL Premier Division
22	Mossley (R)	42	11	5	26	52	90	−38	37 (Note: Mossley were docked 1 point.)	Relegation to NWCFL Division One

Updated to match(es) played on May 1995. Source: .
Rules for classification: 1) points; 2) goal difference; 3) number of goals scored.
(C) Champions; (P) Promoted; (R) Relegated

== Promotion and relegation ==
In the twenty-seventh season of the Northern Premier League Marine should have been (as champions) automatically promoted to the Football Conference, but were not as they did not meet the Conference's requirements, so second placed Morecambe took their place. Whitley Bay and Horwich RMI were relegated to the First Division; these two clubs were replaced by readmitted Leek Town (returning from the Southern League), First Division winners Blyth Spartans and second placed Bamber Bridge. In the First Division Caernarfon Town left the League to join the League of Wales while Goole Town and Mossley left the League altogether at the end of the season; they were replaced by newly admitted Lincoln United and Bradford Park Avenue.

== Cup Results ==
Challenge Cup:

- Bamber Bridge bt. Bishop Auckland

President's Cup:

- Lancaster City bt. Witton Albion

Northern Premier League Shield: Between Champions of NPL Premier Division and Winners of the Presidents Cup.

- Marine bt. Lancaster City
