= Neil Murphy =

English footballer

Personal information
- Full name: Neil Anthony Murphy
- Date of birth: 19 May 1980 (age 46)
- Place of birth: Liverpool, England
- Height: 5 ft 10 in (1.78 m)
- Position: Defender

Team information
- Current team: Maghull FC

Youth career
- 199?–1999: Liverpool

Senior career*
Years	Team	Apps	(Gls)
1999–2000	Liverpool	0	(0)
2000	→ Luton Town (loan)	0	(0)
2000–2002	Blackpool	7	(0)
2002	Altrincham	8	(0)
2002–2006	Marine	106	(4)
2006–2007	Kidsgrove Athletic		
2007–2008	Kendal Town		
2010–	Maghull		

International career
- England U17
1999	England U20	2	(0)
- * Club domestic league appearances and goals

Neil Anthony Murphy (born 19 May 1980 in Liverpool) is an English former professional footballer, who plays for Maghull FC, he also still works part-time as a coach for Liverpool's academy. He has represented England at under-17 and under-20 levels.

== Club career ==
Murphy began his career as a trainee with Liverpool, turning professional in August 1999 at Liverpool, previously he had played in the same youth sides as Steven Gerrard, Michael Owen and Jamie Carragher. He joined Luton Town on loan in February 2000, but returned to Liverpool without making his debut. Released by Liverpool at the end of the season, he joined Third Division club Blackpool on a free transfer in July 2000. He made his debut on 12 August 2000 as a substitute for Mike Newell as Blackpool won 3–1 at home to Hull City.

He joined Altrincham in 2002, but played just eight times before joining Northern Premier League rivals Marine in November 2002.

He joined Kidsgrove Athletic in 2006, but broke his leg in a collision with a teammate while warming up in October 2006. He resigned for Kidsgrove in July 2007, but left to join Kendal Town during the following season. His availability became limited during the 2008–09 season due his new job as a fireman.

In June 2010 Neil joined his home town club Maghull FC who play in the West Cheshire League.

== International career ==
Murphy made two appearances for the England national under-20 team at the 1999 FIFA World Youth Championship in Nigeria. He featured in the group stage against the United States and Japan as England failed to progress to the next round.

== Honours ==
Blackpool

- Football League Third Division play-offs: 2001
