= 1993–94 Northern Premier League =

The 1993–94 Northern Premier League season was the 26th in the history of the Northern Premier League, a football competition in England. Teams were divided into two divisions; the Premier and the First. It was known as the HFS Loans League for sponsorship reasons.

== Premier Division ==
Northern Premier League Premier Division
- Season: 1994–95
- Champions: Marine
- Promoted: None
- Relegated: Fleetwood
- Matches: 462
- Goals: 1,505 (3.26 per match)

The Premier Division featured three new teams:

- Boston United relegated from the Football Conference
- Bridlington Town promoted as champions of Division One
- Knowsley United promoted as runners-up of Division One

=== League table ===
Pos	Team	Pld	W	D	L	GF	GA	GD	Pts	Relegation
1	Marine (C)	42	27	9	6	106	62	+44	90 (Note: Marine were not promoted due to ground grading standards.)	
2	Leek Town	42	27	8	7	79	50	+29	89	Transferred to the Southern League Premier Division
3	Boston United	42	23	9	10	90	43	+47	78	
4	Bishop Auckland	42	23	9	10	73	58	+15	78	
5	Frickley Athletic	42	21	12	9	90	51	+39	75	
6	Colwyn Bay	42	18	14	10	74	51	+23	68	
7	Morecambe	42	20	7	15	90	56	+34	67	
8	Barrow	42	18	10	14	59	51	+8	64	
9	Hyde United	42	17	10	15	80	71	+9	61	
10	Chorley	42	17	10	15	70	67	+3	61	
11	Whitley Bay	42	17	9	16	61	72	−11	60	
12	Gainsborough Trinity	42	15	11	16	64	66	−2	56	
13	Emley	42	12	16	14	63	71	−8	52	
14	Matlock Town	42	13	12	17	71	76	−5	51	
15	Buxton	42	13	10	19	67	73	−6	49	
16	Accrington Stanley	42	14	7	21	63	85	−22	49	
17	Droylsden	42	11	14	17	57	82	−25	47	
18	Knowsley United	42	11	11	20	52	66	−14	44	
19	Winsford United	42	9	11	22	50	74	−24	38	
20	Horwich RMI	42	8	12	22	50	75	−25	35 (Note: Horwich RMI were docked 1 point.)	
21	Bridlington Town	42	7	10	25	41	91	−50	28 (Note: Bridlington Town were docked 3 points.)	Club folded at the end of the season
22	Fleetwood (R)	42	7	7	28	55	114	−59	28 (Note: Fleetwood Town was Reform in December 1993 as Fleetwood.)	Relegation to NPL Division One

Updated to match(es) played on May 1994. Source: .
Rules for classification: 1) points; 2) goal difference; 3) number of goals scored.
(C) Champions; (R) Relegated

=== Results ===
Home \ Away	ACC	BRW	BIS	BOS	BRI	BUX	CHO	COL	DRO	EML	FLE	FRK	GAI	HOR	HYD	KNO	LEE	MAR	MAT	MOR	WHI	WNS
Accrington Stanley		0–5	1–2	1–3	2–1	3–1	1–1	5–5	2–0	1–2	3–1	2–4	2–4	1–0	4–1	2–1	0–3	0–2	0–2	3–2	0–1	4–2
Barrow	1–0		0–2	0–2	4–0	4–0	3–1	0–2	2–2	1–2	1–1	1–3	1–1	0–2	1–4	2–1	3–0	2–1	2–1	1–2	1–0	1–1
Bishop Auckland	0–0	2–1		1–1	1–1	2–1	3–1	3–2	3–1	2–1	3–2	3–1	1–0	1–0	1–2	1–2	2–2	1–4	2–0	2–1	2–0	4–2
Boston United	0–1	0–0	1–2		5–0	2–2	4–0	6–1	2–0	4–0	4–1	2–2	4–1	2–1	3–1	4–1	3–3	4–2	2–0	2–0	0–1	1–1
Bridlington Town	1–1	1–2	0–4	0–1		2–3	0–1	2–0	1–1	1–2	4–1	0–3	0–0	0–2	4–0	0–1	1–1	1–2	2–2	0–4	1–1	3–2
Buxton	3–0	3–0	0–2	0–1	3–1		2–3	1–0	0–3	2–2	4–1	1–1	2–5	4–4	3–0	3–1	1–2	2–2	4–1	0–2	5–4	1–0
Chorley	4–1	3–0	2–5	2–0	1–2	0–0		2–2	6–1	1–1	5–2	2–1	1–1	1–1	4–2	4–1	3–1	0–4	1–2	2–2	0–2	1–0
Colwyn Bay	2–2	2–3	6–0	1–1	5–0	3–1	2–0		4–0	1–0	2–2	1–1	1–2	1–0	2–1	0–0	0–1	0–0	3–0	2–3	1–0	0–0
Droylsden	2–1	0–0	4–2	0–2	1–0	2–1	3–1	0–0		3–3	1–1	2–2	1–4	1–2	3–3	2–1	1–3	2–0	2–4	0–3	3–2	0–0
Emley	4–2	0–0	2–2	1–1	1–1	1–4	0–3	3–3	1–1		3–2	0–0	0–2	1–1	2–2	2–1	1–1	6–2	4–4	2–0	3–1	2–0
Fleetwood Town	1–2	2–3	1–2	1–3	1–0	1–2	1–2	0–3	1–1	2–2		1–1	1–2	2–3	1–0	0–3	2–1	2–3	3–1	0–6	0–1	1–3
Frickley Athletic	2–0	0–0	5–0	0–1	5–0	3–1	5–0	0–1	3–0	1–0	2–2		1–0	5–2	4–1	1–0	1–3	5–2	1–0	3–3	6–1	2–2
Gainsborough Trinity	0–1	2–1	0–0	2–2	3–1	1–1	1–1	0–1	1–2	2–0	5–1	2–3		4–0	1–1	2–1	3–5	1–2	2–2	0–1	1–3	3–1
Horwich RMI	2–4	0–2	2–1	0–5	0–1	1–0	2–2	2–3	2–2	1–1	2–3	1–1	1–2		0–1	3–0	0–1	3–5	1–1	1–3	1–1	0–2
Hyde United	1–4	2–1	1–1	2–1	6–1	1–1	2–1	1–2	4–2	2–1	5–2	4–0	4–0	1–1		0–0	5–0	1–3	1–0	2–3	6–0	1–1
Knowsley United	0–0	2–0	1–1	1–2	0–0	1–1	0–1	1–5	2–0	2–0	0–1	0–2	1–1	1–0	2–1		0–0	1–1	5–1	2–3	1–1	3–1
Leek Town	2–1	0–0	2–1	2–1	0–2	2–1	1–0	2–0	4–2	2–0	3–0	1–0	2–0	2–0	3–0	3–2		1–4	2–1	2–0	2–1	3–1
Marine	2–1	2–2	3–1	3–2	3–0	1–0	4–1	1–1	2–1	4–1	4–0	4–1	3–0	1–1	1–1	3–2	3–2		0–0	4–2	6–3	2–2
Matlock Town	3–3	0–2	0–2	2–1	3–0	1–1	2–1	3–1	1–1	2–3	6–1	1–5	5–2	1–0	1–2	2–2	3–3	1–2		3–1	1–1	3–0
Morecambe	5–0	1–2	0–2	1–2	7–1	4–1	0–1	1–1	1–2	1–0	8–0	1–2	3–0	1–1	2–3	5–0	0–0	3–2	2–2		0–0	1–0
Whitley Bay	4–1	0–2	2–1	2–1	4–3	1–0	0–0	1–1	1–1	2–0	4–3	2–2	0–1	3–1	2–0	1–3	0–4	0–4	3–0	3–1		2–1
Winsford United	3–1	1–2	0–0	1–0	2–2	2–1	0–4	0–1	4–1	1–3	1–4	1–0	0–0	1–3	2–2	4–3	1–2	2–3	0–3	0–1	2–0	

Updated to match(es) played on 7 May 1994. Source: Northern Premier Division results grid
Legend: Blue = home team win; Yellow = draw; Red = away team win.

== Division One ==
Northern Premier League Division One
- Season: 1993–94
- Champions: Guiseley
- Promoted: Guiseley; Spennymoor United
- Relegated: None
- Matches: 420
- Goals: 1,354 (3.22 per match)

Division One featured four new teams:

- Bamber Bridge promoted as runners-up from the NWCFL Division One
- Goole Town relegated from the Premier Division
- Mossley relegated from the Premier Division
- Spennymoor United promoted as champions from the NCEFL Premier Division

=== League table ===
Pos	Team	Pld	W	D	L	GF	GA	GD	Pts	Promotion
1	Guiseley (C, P)	40	29	6	5	87	37	+50	93	Promotion to Premier Division
2	Spennymoor United (P)	40	25	6	9	95	50	+45	81	Promotion to Premier Division
3	Ashton United	40	24	7	9	85	41	+44	79	
4	Lancaster City	40	20	10	10	74	46	+28	70	
5	Netherfield	40	20	6	14	68	60	+8	66	
6	Alfreton Town	40	18	10	12	83	70	+13	64	
7	Warrington Town	40	17	11	12	52	48	+4	62	
8	Goole Town	40	16	11	13	72	58	+14	59	
9	Great Harwood Town	40	15	14	11	56	60	−4	59	
10	Gretna	40	16	7	17	64	65	−1	55	
11	Workington	40	14	10	16	70	74	−4	52	
12	Worksop Town	40	14	9	17	79	87	−8	51	
13	Bamber Bridge	40	13	11	16	62	59	+3	50	
14	Curzon Ashton	40	13	8	19	62	71	−9	47	
15	Congleton Town	40	12	9	19	53	68	−15	45	
16	Radcliffe Borough	40	10	14	16	62	75	−13	44	
17	Mossley	40	10	12	18	44	68	−24	39 (Note: Mossley were docked 3 points.)	
18	Caernarfon Town	40	9	11	20	54	88	−34	38	
19	Farsley Celtic	40	6	16	18	42	77	−35	34	
20	Harrogate Town	40	8	9	23	40	86	−46	33	
21	Eastwood Town	40	7	11	22	47	63	−16	32	

Updated to match(es) played on May 1994. Source:
Rules for classification: 1) points; 2) goal difference; 3) number of goals scored.
(C) Champions; (P) Promoted

== Promotion and relegation ==
In the twenty-sixth season of the Northern Premier League Marine should have been (as champions) automatically promoted to the Football Conference, but were not as they did not meet the Conference's requirements. Bridlington Town folded at the end of the season, meaning only Fleetwood were relegated to the First Division, while Leek Town moved to the Southern League Premier Division; these three clubs were replaced by relegated Conference side Witton Albion, First Division winners Guiseley and second placed Spennymoor United. Meanwhile, Blyth Spartans and Atherton Laburnum Rovers were admitted into the First Division.

== Cup Results ==
Challenge Cup:

- Spennymoor United bt. Hyde United

President's Cup:

- Guiseley bt. Leek Town

Northern Premier League Shield: Between Champions of NPL Premier Division and Winners of the Presidents Cup.

- Marine bt. Guiseley
