= 1995–96 Northern Premier League =

The 1995–96 Northern Premier League season was the 28th in the history of the Northern Premier League, a football competition in England. Teams were divided into two divisions; the Premier and the First. It was known as the Unibond League for sponsorship reasons.

== Premier Division ==
Northern Premier League Premier Division
- Season: 1995–96
- Champions: Bamber Bridge
- Relegated: Droylsden; Matlock Town
- Matches: 462
- Goals: 1,350 (2.92 per match)

The Premier Division featured three new teams:

- Bamber Bridge promoted as runners up from Division One
- Blyth Spartans promoted as champions from Division One
- Leek Town transferred from the Southern League Premier Division

=== League table ===
Pos	Team	Pld	W	D	L	GF	GA	GD	Pts	Relegation
1	Bamber Bridge (C)	42	20	16	6	81	49	+32	76 (Note: Bamber bridge were not promoted due to ground standards.)	
2	Boston United	42	23	6	13	86	59	+27	75	
3	Hyde United	42	21	11	10	86	51	+35	74	
4	Barrow	42	20	13	9	69	42	+27	73	
5	Gainsborough Trinity	42	20	13	9	60	41	+19	73	
6	Blyth Spartans	42	17	13	12	75	61	+14	64	
7	Accrington Stanley	42	17	14	11	62	54	+8	62 (Note: Accrington Stanley and Frickley Athletic were docked 3 points.)	
8	Emley	42	17	10	15	57	53	+4	61	
9	Spennymoor United	42	14	18	10	67	61	+6	60	
10	Bishop Auckland	42	16	11	15	60	55	+5	59	
11	Guiseley	42	15	14	13	62	57	+5	59	
12	Marine	42	15	14	13	59	54	+5	59	
13	Witton Albion	42	17	8	17	60	62	−2	59	
14	Chorley	42	14	9	19	67	74	−7	51	
15	Knowsley United	42	14	6	22	61	89	−28	48	
16	Winsford United	42	10	16	16	56	79	−23	46	
17	Leek Town	42	10	15	17	52	55	−3	45	
18	Colwyn Bay	42	8	21	13	43	57	−14	45	
19	Frickley Athletic	42	11	14	17	63	87	−24	44	
20	Buxton	42	9	11	22	43	72	−29	38	
21	Droylsden (R)	42	10	8	24	58	100	−42	38	Relegation to NPL Division One
22	Matlock Town (R)	42	8	11	23	71	86	−15	35	Relegation to NPL Division One

Updated to match(es) played on 7 November 2015. Source: .
Rules for classification: 1) points; 2) goal difference; 3) number of goals scored.
(C) Champions; (R) Relegated

=== Results ===
Home \ Away	ACC	BAM	BRW	BIS	BLY	BOS	BUX	CHO	COL	DRO	EML	FRK	GAI	GUI	HYD	KNO	LEE	MAR	MAT	SPU	WNS	WTN
Accrington Stanley		1–2	1–1	2–1	1–2	0–2	1–0	7–3	3–1	0–2	0–0	2–1	2–1	0–1	1–1	4–2	0–0	0–0	2–1	0–0	1–2	1–2
Bamber Bridge	1–1		2–2	0–2	3–0	1–2	2–0	2–0	5–0	3–2	0–1	2–3	1–1	3–1	3–3	2–2	0–0	4–4	4–1	2–0	2–0	1–1
Barrow	0–3	0–2		0–0	2–1	2–0	1–0	6–2	1–1	3–3	0–0	1–1	0–1	0–2	2–1	7–0	1–0	2–0	3–1	1–1	1–1	3–0
Bishop Auckland	2–2	1–1	1–2		3–0	1–3	1–1	3–1	1–0	3–2	1–0	3–1	1–1	2–2	1–1	1–2	1–1	0–1	2–3	1–2	1–0	1–2
Blyth Spartans	2–2	1–1	1–2	6–0		0–3	1–1	3–2	2–0	2–1	0–0	1–1	0–0	3–3	5–1	4–1	2–1	2–2	3–0	3–1	3–2	2–0
Boston United	4–0	0–3	2–1	1–0	1–0		9–3	2–1	0–0	0–1	1–1	1–3	1–2	4–3	0–3	4–2	2–2	0–1	1–0	4–1	2–2	1–2
Buxton	0–1	1–2	0–0	1–2	2–1	0–3		5–2	0–1	0–3	1–2	1–0	1–2	0–0	0–1	3–2	1–2	1–3	3–1	1–1	1–3	0–4
Chorley	0–0	0–0	2–3	2–0	1–4	0–2	2–1		1–1	6–0	1–0	1–1	0–6	1–0	1–1	1–0	3–1	1–1	3–2	0–3	1–1	4–0
Colwyn Bay	1–2	1–1	0–1	1–3	0–0	3–1	1–1	1–1		0–0	1–0	1–3	0–0	0–0	1–3	0–0	0–0	0–0	3–3	2–3	1–1	1–1
Droylsden	1–2	1–2	0–4	1–4	2–2	2–5	1–3	0–6	0–1		3–0	2–2	1–2	1–2	0–2	5–1	2–1	2–1	3–0	1–1	1–1	2–1
Emley	1–3	1–1	1–2	1–1	1–3	2–0	2–1	0–3	4–1	4–0		5–2	1–0	2–0	1–0	1–3	0–1	2–0	3–2	0–2	1–1	1–0
Frickley Athletic	4–1	0–5	0–0	0–3	1–2	1–2	0–2	1–0	1–1	4–5	2–1		3–0	2–2	3–0	4–3	1–1	1–1	1–4	2–3	3–3	1–1
Gainsborough Trinity	1–1	1–3	2–0	1–0	4–0	2–1	2–2	1–0	2–2	7–1	0–3	0–2		0–2	0–0	2–1	1–0	1–0	2–2	0–1	0–0	1–0
Guiseley	1–3	4–0	1–3	2–0	1–1	4–2	1–0	0–3	1–0	3–0	1–1	3–0	1–3		0–1	1–1	3–1	2–4	4–2	2–2	1–1	0–1
Hyde United	0–0	2–3	0–0	3–1	4–1	2–4	7–0	3–1	5–1	1–1	7–2	4–1	1–2	1–1		5–0	3–2	4–0	1–1	3–2	0–1	1–0
Knowsley United	1–0	2–2	0–2	1–2	1–0	2–4	2–0	1–2	1–3	2–0	1–3	1–2	2–3	1–1	2–1		3–1	2–1	1–0	2–0	4–1	2–2
Leek Town	2–2	2–3	2–0	0–1	1–3	2–2	0–0	2–0	1–1	4–0	2–2	1–1	0–0	1–1	0–1	2–0		0–1	4–2	0–2	5–1	2–1
Marine	1–2	0–0	1–2	2–2	0–0	0–4	1–1	2–1	1–1	6–1	0–1	1–1	3–0	0–1	4–0	2–1	2–1		1–0	2–1	3–1	2–1
Matlock Town	2–0	0–1	0–4	1–1	3–3	0–2	0–1	4–3	1–4	2–2	1–1	6–0	0–2	3–0	1–3	8–0	0–1	3–3		1–1	1–1	5–2
Spennymoor United	3–4	4–2	1–1	1–0	2–1	2–3	0–0	2–2	0–0	2–0	2–0	2–2	1–1	0–0	0–1	1–4	4–2	2–2	1–1		3–3	3–1
Winsford United	2–2	1–4	4–3	0–4	2–4	1–0	1–1	0–2	1–3	3–2	0–4	4–1	1–1	1–2	1–4	0–1	0–0	1–0	3–1	2–2		2–1
Witton Albion	0–2	0–0	1–0	1–2	2–1	1–1	1–3	2–1	2–3	2–1	3–1	5–0	0–2	3–2	1–1	2–1	2–1	2–0	3–2	2–2	2–0	

Updated to match(es) played on 4 May 1996. Source: Northern Premier Division results grid
Legend: Blue = home team win; Yellow = draw; Red = away team win.

== Division One ==
Northern Premier League Division One
- Season: 1995–96
- Champions: Lancaster City
- Promoted: Lancaster City; Alfreton Town
- Relegated: None
- Matches: 420
- Goals: 1,345 (3.2 per match)

Division One featured four new teams:

- Bradford Park Avenue promoted as champions from the NWCFL Division One
- Leigh RMI relegated from the Premier Division
- Lincoln United promoted as champions from the NCEFL Premier Division
- Whitley Bay relegated from the Premier Division

=== League table ===
Pos	Team	Pld	W	D	L	GF	GA	GD	Pts	Promotion
1	Lancaster City (C, P)	40	24	11	5	79	38	+41	83	Promotion to Premier Division
2	Alfreton Town (P)	40	23	9	8	79	47	+32	78	Promotion to Premier Division
3	Lincoln United	40	22	7	11	80	56	+24	73	
4	Curzon Ashton	40	20	7	13	73	53	+20	67	
5	Farsley Celtic	40	19	9	12	66	61	+5	66	
6	Radcliffe Borough	40	17	13	10	70	48	+22	64	
7	Eastwood Town	40	18	9	13	60	47	+13	63	
8	Whitley Bay	40	18	8	14	72	62	+10	62	
9	Ashton United	40	19	7	14	73	65	+8	60 (Note: Ashton United were docked 4 points.)	
10	Atherton Laburnum Rovers	40	15	12	13	60	61	−1	57	
11	Worksop Town	40	16	8	16	84	90	−6	56	
12	Gretna	40	13	13	14	75	65	+10	52	
13	Warrington Town	40	13	10	17	75	72	+3	49	
14	Leigh RMI (Note: From this season onwards Horwich RMI were known as Leigh RMI.)	40	14	7	19	53	59	−6	49	
15	Netherfield	40	13	10	17	64	73	−9	49	
16	Workington	40	11	12	17	50	62	−12	45	
17	Bradford Park Avenue	40	9	14	17	57	72	−15	41	
18	Congleton Town	40	11	11	18	36	59	−23	41 (Note: Congleton Town were docked 3 points.)	
19	Great Harwood Town	40	9	7	24	44	78	−34	33 (Note: Great Harwood Town were docked 1 point.)	
20	Fleetwood	40	7	10	23	41	81	−40	31	Club folded at the end of the season
21	Harrogate Town	40	7	10	23	54	96	−42	31	

Updated to match(es) played on May 1996. Source: .
Rules for classification: 1) points; 2) goal difference; 3) number of goals scored.
(C) Champions; (P) Promoted

== Promotion and relegation ==
In the twenty-eighth season of the Northern Premier League Bamber Bridge should have been (as champions) automatically promoted to the Football Conference, but were not as they did not meet the Conference's requirements. Droylsden and Matlock Town were relegated to the First Division; these two clubs were replaced by relegated Conference side Runcorn, First Division winners Lancaster City and second placed Alfreton Town. In the First Division Fleetwood folded at the end of the season and were replaced by newly admitted Stocksbridge Park Steels and Flixton.

== Cup Results ==
Challenge Cup: Teams from both leagues.

- Hyde United bt. Leek Town

President's Cup: 'Plate' competition for losing teams in the NPL Cup.

- Worksop Town bt. Guiseley

Northern Premier League Shield: Between Champions of NPL Premier Division and Winners of the NPL Cup.

- Hyde United bt. Bamber Bridge
