= 1993–94 Football Conference =

Football Conference
- Season: 1993–94
- Champions: Kidderminster Harriers (2nd Football Conference title)
- Promoted to the Football League: None
- Conference League Cup winners: Macclesfield Town
- FA Trophy winners: Woking
- Relegated to Level 6: Slough Town, Witton Albion
- Matches: 462
- Goals: 1,119 (2.42 per match)
- Top goalscorer: (England) Paul Dobson (Gateshead), 25
- Biggest home win: Halifax Town – Telford United 6–0 (2 October 1993)
- Biggest away win: Woking – Dagenham & Redbridge 1–8 (19 April 1994)
- Highest scoring: Woking – Dagenham & Redbridge 1–8 (19 April 1994)
- Longest winning run: Kidderminster Harriers, 8 matches
- Longest unbeaten run: Runcorn, 15 matches
- Longest losing run: Welling United, Yeovil Town 5 matches
- Highest attendance: Kidderminster Harriers v Bromsgrove Rovers, 4,438 (5 April 1994)
- Lowest attendance: ?
- Average attendance: 1,065

The Football Conference season of 1993–94 was the fifteenth season of the Football Conference, also known as the GM Vauxhall Conference for sponsorship reasons.

== Overview ==
Kidderminster Harriers finished the season as Conference champions, but were unable to gain promotion to the Football League as their stadium failed to meet capacity requirements. As a result, the bottom placed Third Division club Northampton Town avoided relegation to the Conference.

== New teams in the league this season ==
- Halifax Town (relegated from the Football League 1992–93)
- Dover Athletic (promoted 1992–93)
- Southport (promoted 1992–93)

== Final league table ==
Pos	Team	Pld	W	D	L	GF	GA	GD	Pts	Qualification or relegation
1	Kidderminster Harriers (C)	42	22	9	11	63	35	+28	75	No promotion (Note: Kidderminster Harriers were denied promotion to the Football League Third Division due to failing to meet Football League ground requirements.)
2	Kettering Town	42	19	15	8	46	24	+22	72	
3	Woking	42	18	13	11	58	58	0	67	
4	Southport	42	18	12	12	57	51	+6	66	
5	Runcorn	42	14	19	9	63	57	+6	61	
6	Dagenham & Redbridge	42	15	14	13	62	54	+8	59	
7	Macclesfield Town	42	16	11	15	48	49	−1	59	
8	Dover Athletic	42	17	7	18	48	49	−1	58	
9	Stafford Rangers	42	14	15	13	56	52	+4	57	
10	Altrincham	42	16	9	17	41	42	−1	57	
11	Gateshead	42	15	12	15	45	53	−8	57	
12	Bath City	42	13	17	12	47	38	+9	56	
13	Halifax Town	42	13	16	13	55	49	+6	55	
14	Stalybridge Celtic	42	14	12	16	54	55	−1	54	
15	Northwich Victoria	42	11	19	12	44	45	−1	52	
16	Welling United	42	13	12	17	47	49	−2	51	
17	Telford United	42	13	12	17	41	49	−8	51	
18	Bromsgrove Rovers	42	12	15	15	54	66	−12	51	
19	Yeovil Town	42	14	9	19	49	62	−13	51	
20	Merthyr Tydfil	42	12	15	15	60	61	−1	49 (Note: Merthyr Tydfil were deducted 2 points.)	Reprived from relegation (Note: Merthyr Tydfil were reprived from relegation because Northern Premier League champions Marine did not meet Conference ground requirements.)
21	Slough Town (R)	42	11	14	17	44	58	−14	47	Relegation to the Isthmian League Premier Division
22	Witton Albion (R)	42	7	13	22	37	63	−26	34	Relegation to Northern Premier League Premier Division

(C) Champions; (R) Relegated

== Results ==
Home \ Away	ALT	BAT	BRO	D&R	DOV	GAT	HAL	KET	KID	MAC	MER	NOR	RUN	SLO	SOU	STA	STL	TEL	WEL	WTN	WOK	YEO
Altrincham		0–2	2–3	1–2	2–0	0–3	0–0	1–1	1–0	0–1	3–0	2–2	2–1	2–0	1–2	0–0	0–0	2–0	2–0	1–3	0–2	1–0
Bath City	0–1		0–1	0–0	0–0	2–3	2–2	0–3	4–0	5–1	0–3	0–0	0–0	3–0	2–1	2–3	1–1	3–0	0–0	1–1	0–1	3–0
Bromsgrove Rovers	1–2	0–1		2–0	1–2	3–0	1–0	0–4	0–3	3–0	3–3	0–0	0–0	0–1	2–2	3–3	2–0	0–5	1–1	3–3	0–0	1–2
Dagenham & Redbridge	3–0	3–0	4–2		2–1	1–1	3–0	2–3	1–1	1–1	0–1	1–1	2–1	1–0	3–3	1–0	0–1	4–1	2–0	2–1	3–4	2–1
Dover Athletic	1–0	0–3	4–3	1–1		3–1	1–2	0–1	3–1	1–2	1–0	2–0	2–3	0–0	0–2	2–0	1–1	0–1	0–1	1–0	5–0	0–2
Gateshead	2–1	1–0	0–1	3–1	1–2		2–1	0–0	0–2	1–0	0–0	1–0	2–2	0–0	1–3	0–0	2–1	0–2	1–0	3–0	1–1	2–1
Halifax Town	0–0	0–0	3–0	0–1	0–1	3–1		0–0	1–0	1–2	2–1	1–2	1–1	1–0	2–2	1–1	2–1	6–0	1–1	0–0	2–3	1–1
Kettering Town	1–0	0–1	0–1	1–1	1–0	0–0	0–1		1–1	0–1	0–0	0–0	2–2	2–0	2–0	2–0	3–2	1–2	2–2	1–0	3–0	1–0
Kidderminster Harriers	0–1	0–0	1–1	2–1	3–0	1–1	2–1	0–2		2–1	2–0	2–0	3–0	0–0	2–0	2–0	1–0	2–0	1–0	0–0	3–1	2–3
Macclesfield Town	1–0	0–0	4–3	3–0	0–2	6–1	0–1	0–0	0–0		1–2	0–0	0–0	2–2	0–1	0–0	1–3	1–0	1–0	2–0	1–1	1–2
Merthyr Tydfil	0–0	1–1	2–1	0–0	0–0	3–0	2–1	0–1	1–4	2–1		5–0	1–1	5–1	2–2	2–0	1–2	0–3	0–1	4–3	2–3	1–1
Northwich Victoria	2–0	3–1	1–1	2–2	0–1	1–2	0–2	1–1	3–0	1–1	1–2		1–1	1–1	2–1	0–0	2–0	1–0	3–1	0–1	0–0	1–1
Runcorn	2–1	0–0	4–1	2–1	2–1	1–1	5–0	0–0	0–5	2–1	1–1	1–2		3–2	3–0	2–2	1–1	3–2	2–4	1–0	2–1	4–0
Slough Town	0–2	0–0	1–1	3–1	1–0	2–1	2–0	0–2	1–5	1–1	3–2	2–2	3–0		0–0	3–0	2–3	0–0	1–1	0–1	0–0	5–2
Southport	3–1	1–1	1–2	0–0	3–2	1–1	2–2	0–1	1–1	1–0	3–2	0–0	1–0	1–0		0–2	0–2	1–0	2–1	2–1	2–1	1–1
Stafford Rangers	0–1	2–0	0–0	2–0	2–2	3–1	1–1	1–0	2–3	2–3	5–1	3–1	2–2	0–0	0–2		2–2	1–1	3–0	1–0	3–0	4–2
Stalybridge Celtic	1–3	1–3	0–2	5–0	0–0	2–1	1–1	1–1	0–2	0–2	2–2	1–1	1–2	0–1	3–1	1–2		1–0	2–1	2–1	2–2	1–2
Telford United	0–2	0–0	0–0	0–0	0–1	0–0	3–2	1–2	1–0	1–3	1–0	2–1	1–1	4–1	1–3	2–1	0–2		2–0	2–2	2–0	1–1
Welling United	2–1	0–0	1–1	0–0	2–0	1–2	0–2	2–0	0–3	0–1	1–1	0–1	1–1	6–2	0–2	2–1	1–2	0–0		2–1	2–2	2–0
Witton Albion	0–1	0–3	4–1	1–1	1–2	1–0	2–2	0–1	2–0	0–2	2–2	1–1	1–1	1–0	0–2	1–1	0–3	0–0	0–5		0–0	1–2
Woking	1–1	4–1	0–0	1–8	3–0	1–0	2–6	0–0	1–0	3–0	2–1	2–1	1–1	2–1	1–0	4–0	3–0	0–0	0–2	3–1		1–2
Yeovil Town	0–0	1–2	2–3	2–1	1–3	0–2	0–0	1–0	0–1	4–0	2–2	0–3	4–2	0–2	3–2	0–1	0–0	1–0	0–1	2–0	0–1	

Updated to match(es) played on unknown. Source: Jack Rollin (ed.), Rothmans Football Yearbook 1994–95. Headline, 1994.
Legend: Blue = home team win; Yellow = draw; Red = away team win.
Locations of the Football Conference 1993–1994 teams
Locations of the Football Conference teams 1993–1994

== Promotion and relegation ==
=== Promoted ===
- Farnborough Town (from the Southern Premier League)
- Stevenage Borough (from the Isthmian League)

=== Relegated ===
- Slough Town (to the Isthmian League)
- Witton Albion (to the Northern Premier League)

== Top scorers in order of league goals ==
Rank	Player	Club	League	FA Cup	FA Trophy	League Cup	Total
1	(England) Paul Dobson	Gateshead	25	3	4	2	34
2	(England) Karl Thomas	Runcorn	23	0	5	2	30
3	(England) Paul Adcock	Bath City	17	4	1	0	22
=	(England) Terry Robbins	Welling United	17	0	2	2	21
5	(England) Mickey Spencer	Yeovil Town	16	0	1	1	18
=	(England) Clive Walker	Woking	16	0	3	0	19
7	(England) David Gamble	Southport	15	2	2	0	19
=	(England) David Leworthy	Dover Athletic	15	1	1	3	20
9	(England) Carl Alford	Macclesfield Town	14	3	2	6	25
=	(England) Paul Davies	Kidderminster Harriers	14	1	0	3	18
=	(Wales) Morrys Scott	Slough Town	14	2	1	0	17
12	(England) Recky Carter	Bromsgrove Rovers	13	3	2	0	18
=	(Scotland) Jamie Paterson	Halifax Town	13	0	2	1	16
=	(England) Delwyn Humphreys	Kidderminster Harriers	13	3	0	1	17
