= A.F.C. Blackpool =

Association football club in England

Coordinates: 53°46′42.77″N 3°01′13.79″W

AFC Blackpool
- Full name: Association Football Club Blackpool
- Nickname: The Mechanics
- Founded: 1947
- Ground: The Mechanics, Jepson Way, Blackpool
- Capacity: 2,000 (250 seated)
- Chairman: Stuart Parker
- Manager: Martin Baird
- League: North West Counties League Division One North
- 2025–26: North West Counties League Division One North, 14th of 18
Home colours	Away colours

A.F.C. Blackpool is a football club based in Blackpool, Lancashire, England. The club currently play in the North West Counties League Division One North. Based at Jepson Way, they are nicknamed The Mechanics or The Mechs, and are full members of the Lancashire County Football Association.

== History ==
Blackpool Mechanics club crest

The club was founded as Blackpool Metal Mechanics in 1947 before changing their name to Blackpool Mechanics. They initially played in local leagues on the Fylde coast. They won the Fylde District League Division Two title in the 1950–51 season and were promoted to Division One, where between 1953–54 and 1957–58 they were champions twice and runners-up three times in five consecutive seasons. They also won a number of local cup competitions, including the Lancashire FA Amateur Shield in 1957–58.

In 1959 the club took the decision move up the leagues and joined the West Lancashire League. In their first season, 1959–60, they were runners-up. In 1960–61 they were champions and also won the Lancashire FA Amateur Shield again. The following season they were again West Lancashire League champions. In 1962 they joined the Lancashire Combination Division Two. The division was disbanded in 1968, with the league becoming a single division. The 1971–72 season saw a third-place finish. In the 1972–73 season they won the Lancashire Combination Bridge Shield and in 1974–75 finished as runners-up in the league, just one point behind champions Darwen.

With the formation of the North West Counties Football League, they were placed in Division Three, finishing sixth in their first season in the new League. They were promoted as champions to Division Two in 1985–86. They were briefly promoted to Division One in 1991–92 before being relegated back to Division Two, renamed Division One in 2006.

In May 2005 Lytham St. Annes FC, who had just won the West Lancashire League Division One title, merged into the Mechanics after resigning from the West Lancashire league. In May 2008 the Mechanics merged with Squires Gate Junior FC, with the club renamed AFC Blackpool. The name change depended upon Blackpool F.C. giving it their full approval, and in July 2008 they confirmed to the Lancashire Football Association that they had no objections and that they were keen to help the club.

As champions of Division One in 2010–11, they were promoted to the Premier Division. On 21 March 2015, some Blackpool F.C. fans boycotted their match with Leeds in protest of chairman Karl Oyston's management of the club, deciding instead to attend AFC Blackpool's match against Bootle. The game saw an attendance of 503 compared with an average of 35 that season; some Leeds fans also attended the match as part of a combined general protest "against the Football League." The club were relegated to the North West Counties League First Division at the end of the 2015–16 season, in which they finished bottom of the table.

=== Season-by-season record ===
Season	Division	Position	Notes
1947–48	Fylde District Football League Division Two		
1948–49	Fylde District Football League Division Two		
1949–50	Fylde District Football League Division Two		
1950–51	Fylde District Football League Division Two	1	Champions
1951–52	Fylde District Football League Division One		
1952–53	Fylde District Football League Division One		
1953–54	Fylde District Football League Division One		
1954–55	Fylde District Football League Division One		
1955–56	Fylde District Football League Division One		
1956–57	Fylde District Football League Division One		
1957–58	Fylde District Football League Division One		
1958–59	Fylde District Football League Division One		
1959–60	West Lancashire League	2	Runners-up
1960–61	West Lancashire League	1	Champions
1961–62	West Lancashire League	1	Champions
1962–63	Lancashire Combination Division Two	11/20	
1963–64	Lancashire Combination Division Two	14/18	
1964–65	Lancashire Combination Division Two	9/17	
1965–66	Lancashire Combination Division Two	11/14	
1966–67	Lancashire Combination Division Two	10/16	
1967–68	Lancashire Combination Division Two	10/17	League reduced to single division
1968–69	Lancashire Combination	9/22	
1969–70	Lancashire Combination	9/20	
1970–71	Lancashire Combination	7/16	
1971–72	Lancashire Combination	3/15	
1972–73	Lancashire Combination	7/20	
1973–74	Lancashire Combination	8/20	
1974–75	Lancashire Combination	2/20	Runners-up
1975–76	Lancashire Combination	4/18	
1976–77	Lancashire Combination	9/18	
1977–78	Lancashire Combination	14/18	
1978–79	Lancashire Combination	9/15	
1979–80	Lancashire Combination	15/17	
1980–81	Lancashire Combination	16/18	
1981–82	Lancashire Combination	8/18	
1982–83	North West Counties League Division Three	6/18	
1983–84	North West Counties League Division Three	7/18	
1984–85	North West Counties League Division Three	5/18	
1985–86	North West Counties League Division Three	1/15	Champions, promoted
1986–87	North West Counties League Division Two	12/18	
1987–88	North West Counties League Division Two	15/22	
1988–89	North West Counties League Division Two	16/18	
1989–90	North West Counties League Division Two	3/16	
1990–91	North West Counties League Division Two	5/18	
1991–92	North West Counties League Division Two	3/18	Promoted
1992–93	North West Counties League Division One	22/22	Relegated
1993–94	North West Counties League Division Two	13/18	
1994–95	North West Counties League Division Two	8/16	
1995–96	North West Counties League Division Two	15/18	
1996–97	North West Counties League Division Two	18/20	
1997–98	North West Counties League Division Two	21/21	
1998–99	North West Counties League Division Two	19/19	
1999–2000	North West Counties League Division Two	15/18	
2000–01	North West Counties League Division Two	6/20	
2001–02	North West Counties League Division Two	8/21	
2002–03	North West Counties League Division Two	14/18	
2003–04	North West Counties League Division Two	14/20	
2004–05	North West Counties League Division Two	10/19	
2005–06	North West Counties League Division Two	9/19	
2006–07	North West Counties League Division Two	13/18	
2007–08	North West Counties League Division Two	9/18	Division Two renamed First Division. Club renamed AFC Blackpool
2008–09	North West Counties League First Division	15/18	
2009–10	North West Counties League First Division	15/17	
2010–11	North West Counties League First Division	1/18	Champions, promoted
2011–12	North West Counties League Premier Division	9/22	
2012–13	North West Counties League Premier Division	10/22	
2013–14	North West Counties League Premier Division	13/22	
2014–15	North West Counties League Premier Division	18/21	
2015–16	North West Counties League Premier Division	22/22	Relegated
2016–17	North West Counties League First Division	19/22	

== Ground ==
The club play at The Mechanics on Jepson Way, having originally played at Stanley Park Arena.

In December 2007, the club announced plans for a £60,000 refurbishment programme, including improvements to the pitch, as well as new crowd barrier fencing and concreting the spectators area right round the pitch. Drainage work began on the pitch in April 2008, as well as levelling and reseeding the pitch. Following the club's name change in May 2008 they leased a further piece of land next to the ground to accommodate the enlarged club. Also investment to improve the facilities was begun. It was also decided that the ground would take the name The Mechanics to maintain the link with the past.

In February 2006 the club had to switch their match against FC United of Manchester to Blackpool's Bloomfield Road ground due to the anticipated large crowd. Around 4,300 spectators saw the Mechanics lose the game 4–2, bringing in £10,000 for the club.

The ground has four stands. On the east side is the main stand which contains the dressing rooms, club offices and clubhouse with two rows of spectator seating. On the West side is a 100 capacity seated stand with the dugouts either side. There are small terraced stands behind each goal.

== Honours ==
- Lancashire Combination
  - Bridge Shield winners 1972
- North West Counties Football League
  - First Division champions 2010–11
  - Third Division champions 1985–86
- West Lancashire Football League
  - Champions 1960–61, 1961–62
- Fylde District League
  - Division One champions twice
  - Division Two champions 1950–51
- Lancashire FA Amateur Shield
  - Winners 1957–58, 1960–61

== Records ==
- Best FA Cup performance: First qualifying round, 2000–01, 2004–05, 2015–16
- Best FA Trophy performance: First qualifying round, 1974–75, 1975–76
- Best FA Vase performance: Second round, 2010–11
- Record attendance: 4,300 vs FC United of Manchester, 18 February 2006 at Bloomfield Road.
  - At The Mechanics: 770 vs Bury AFC, 5 February 2022

== See also ==
- A.F.C. Blackpool players
- A.F.C. Blackpool managers
