= Burnley Bank Hall F.C. =

Burnley Bank Hall
- Full name: Burnley Bank Hall Football Club

Burnley Bank Hall F.C. was an English association football club.

== History ==
The club competed in the North West Counties League during the 1992/3 season.
