= Stantondale F.C. =

English football club

Stantondale Football Club was an English football club based in Orrell Park, Merseyside.

Founded in 1986, they progressed through the Liverpool County Football Combination before joining the North West Counties Football League in 1992. Despite claiming the Second Division Cup during their first season at the higher level, further success within the league was to remain elusive and in 1998 the club folded.

== Honours ==
- North West Counties Football League Second Division Cup
  - Winners: 1992–93
- Liverpool County Football Combination First Division
  - Champions: 1990–91
- Liverpool County Football Combination Second Division
  - Champions: 1987–88
