= K Chell F.C. =

K Chell
- Full name: K Chell Football Club

K Chell F.C. was an English association football club.

== History ==
The club competed in the North West Counties League during the 1990s.
