= Great Harwood Town F.C. =

Great Harwood Town
- Full name: Great Harwood Town Football Club
- Founded: 1966
- Dissolved: 2006
- Ground: The Showground, Great Harwood
- 2006–07: North West Counties League Division Two, 6/19
Home colours

Great Harwood Town F.C. was a football club based in Great Harwood, Lancashire, England. They joined the Lancashire Combination in 1979 and made their way up to the Northern Premier League Division One during the early 1990s. Although, after spending most of the decade in the league they were ultimately relegated down to the North West Counties League Division Two. Despite being promoted to Division One for the 2004–05 season, the team were relegated back down to Division Two for the 2005–06 season, and folded at the end of the season. The folding was mainly attributed to a fire at their home stadium.

== History ==
They were founded in 1966, and were originally known as Harwood Wellington, being named after the Duke of Wellington pub in the town. In 1978 they took on their present name, also taking over as residents of the Showground. They joined the Lancashire Combination in 1979, and in 1982 the team joined the North West Counties Football League. In the 1990–91 season they reached the quarter-finals of the FA Vase. At the same time the club had success in the league, being promoted in successive seasons to the Northern Premier League Division One. After almost a decade in this league, the team was relegated back down to the NWCFL. After a fire at the Showground, they were forced to play some of their home games at Accrington Stanley's Crown Ground.

Great Harwood Town resigned from the North West Counties League in June 2006, when it became clear that the club would be unable to raise the money to buy back the Showground and repair its dressing rooms, which had been destroyed in the fire 18 months earlier. They officially folded in July 2006, but chairman Bill Holden did not rule out the possibility that the club could be re-launched in the future.

Striker Matt Derbyshire started his career with Great Harwood Town, before moving to Blackburn Rovers, and playing for the England U21s.

Great Harwood Town succeeded Great Harwood as the town's premier club. At this time their manager was Eric Whalley, who was the chairman who led Accrington Stanley into the Football League in 2006.

== Colours ==
The club wore all red.

== Honours ==
- North West Counties League Division One
  - Runners-up 1991–92
- North West Counties League Division Two
  - Champions 1990–91

== Records ==
- Highest league finish
  - Northern Premier League Division One, 8th
  - 1992–93
- FA Cup
  - Second Qualifying Round 1998–99, 2002–03, 2005–06
- FA Trophy
  - Second Round Proper 1998–99
- FA Vase
  - Quarter Finals 1990–91
