= Atherton Laburnum Rovers F.C. =

Association football club in Greater Manchester, England

Coordinates: 53.5311°N 2.4840°W

Atherton Laburnum Rovers
- Full name: Atherton Laburnum Rovers
- Nicknames: The Laburnums, The Panthers
- Founded: 1956
- Ground: Crilly Park, Atherton
- Capacity: 3,000 (250 seated)
- Chairman: Shaun Lynch
- Manager: Leighton Mills
- League: North West Counties League Premier Division
- 2025–26: North West Counties League Premier Division, 3rd of 24
Home colours	Away colours

Atherton Laburnum Rovers Football Club is a football club based in Atherton, Greater Manchester, England. Full members of the Lancashire County FA, they are currently members of the North West Counties League Premier Division and play at Crilly Park.

== History ==
The club were established as an under-14 team by Joe Riley in 1956, and were originally named Laburnum Rovers, named after Laburnum Playing Fields of the Laburnum Cotton Mill where they first played. They joined the Briarcroft Junior League in December that year despite the season already having started, as there was an odd number of teams due to other clubs dropping out; their first competitive fixture was a league cup game against Marsh Players A, which they lost 10–0.

As the players exceeded the league's age limit, the club applied to join the Farnworth under-17s League. However it folded before the season started, and so the club applied to join the Leigh & District League instead, an open-age competition. In 1961 they joined the Bolton Combination. They won the Division Two and the Division Two Trophy in 1965–66, and after moving into a new ground in the summer of 1966, were promoted to Division One for the 1966–67 season.

In 1980 the club joined Division Two of the Cheshire County League, but had to change their name as league rules required the name of the town to be included; as a result they became Atherton Laburnum Rovers. Two seasons later the league merged with the Lancashire Combination to form the North West Counties League, with Atherton placed in Division Two. In the 1984–85 season they won the Bolton Hospital Cup, beating Scotts Park United 3–1 in the final.

Despite finishing second-from-bottom of Division Two in 1986–87 the club were promoted to Division One as part of league reorganisation and due to the quality of the facilities at Crilly Park. In 1992–93 the club won the Division One title, and after retaining it the following season, were promoted to Division One of the Northern Premier League. The 1993–94 season also saw them reach the semi-finals of the FA Vase, in which they lost 2–1 to Diss Town in a replay at VS Rugby after the two legs finished 3–3 on aggregate; the quarter-final match against Aldershot saw the setting of the club's record attendance of 1,856.

The club spent three seasons in the Northern Premier League, before finishing bottom of the division in 1996–97, resulting in relegation back to Division One of the North West Counties League. In 1998–99 they won the Goldline Trophy, beating Atherton Town 3–0 in the final Hilton Park in Leigh. In 1999–2000 the club were relegated again, this time to Division Two, after finishing bottom of Division One. However, a third-place finish in Division Two the following season saw them promoted back to Division One at the first attempt. They also won the Bolton Hospital Cup for a second time, beating Ramsbottom United 2–1 in the final.

The 2003–04 season saw Atherton win two trophies; the Goldline Trophy was won when Blackrod Town were beaten 4–1 at the Reebok Stadium, whilst the Bolton Hospital Cup was won with a 3–1 win over Eagley at the same venue. They remained in the division (which was renamed the Premier Division in 2008) until finishing bottom of the table in 2011–12, after which they were relegated to Division One. When the division was split in 2018, the club were placed in Division One North. In 2023–24 they were runners-up in the division, qualifying for the promotion play-offs, in which they lost 1–0 to South Liverpool in the semi-finals. The following season they were Division One North champions and were promoted back to the Premier Division.

== Ground ==
The club play home matches at Crilly Park, which has a capacity of 3,000, of which 250 is seated; three sides of the ground are covered.

They originally played at Laburnum Road Playing Fields, from which they took their name, and used a shed in a nearby allotment as a changing room. Two seasons later they moved to Hag Fold. In order to progress in the Bolton Combination, the club was required to provide better facilities, so obtained a field where they opened their Greendale ground in 1966.

In the early 1980s the ground was renamed Crilly Park in honour of former chairman Jack Crilly who died in 1980. A stand was erected behind one of the goals in 1983, with two more covered areas built in 1986 and further cover in 1991. Floodlights were installed in 1989, with a new clubhouse and changing rooms built two years later.

== Honours ==
- North West Counties Football League
  - Division One champions 1992–93, 1993–94
  - Division One North champions 2024–25
  - Championship Trophy winners 1992–93, 1993–94
- Bolton Combination
  - Division Two A champions 1965–66
  - Division Two Cup winners 1964–65, 1965–66
- Goldline Trophy
  - Winners 1998–99, 2003–04, 2004–05
- Bolton Hospital Cup
  - Winners 1984–85, 2001–02, 2003–04
- Westhoughton Charity Cup
  - Winners 1981–82

== Records ==
- Record attendance: 1,740 vs Aldershot Town 1993–94
- Best FA Cup performance: Third qualifying round, 1996–97
- Best FA Trophy performance: First qualifying round, 1994–95, 1995–96, 1996–97
- Best FA Vase performance: Semi-finals, 1993–94

== See also ==
- Atherton Laburnum Rovers F.C. players
