= Flixton F.C. =

Coordinates: 53°27′16.02″N 2°23′54.09″W

Flixton
- Full name: Flixton Football Club
- Nickname: The Lions
- Founded: 1960
- Ground: Valley Road Stadium, Flixton
- Chairman: Christopher Garcia
- Manager: Alex Mortimer
- League: North West Counties League Division One North

Flixton Football Club is a football club based in Flixton, Greater Manchester, England. Affiliated with the Manchester Football Association, they are currently members of the North West Counties League Division One North and play their home fixtures at Valley Road Stadium.

The club initially played in the South Manchester & Wythenshawe League, before moving up through the Lancashire & Cheshire Amateur League, the Manchester League, the North West Counties League, reaching the Northern Premier League in the mid-1990s. Subsequently relegated back to the North West Counties League in 2000, the club went into abeyance in 2012. In 2026, the club was revived and re-entered the North West Counties League.

== History ==
The club was formed in 1960, playing firstly in the South Manchester and Wythenshawe League, before moving to the Lancashire & Cheshire Amateur League in 1964.

=== South Manchester & Wythenshawe League - 1960-1964 ===
Their time in this league is still unclear, and it is probable that they were not known as Flixton during this time. They possibly played under the St Johns name, a local Flixton club in the South Manchester & Wythenshawe League, and this was the club that many of the first Flixton players came from. It appears that the team only played as Flixton from 1964 onwards.

=== Lancashire & Cheshire Amateur League - 1964-1973 ===
They applied to join the Lancashire & Cheshire Amateur League in 1964 as Flixton Villa but were accepted only on the proviso that they dropped "Villa".

Playing as Flixton for the 1964–65 season in Division Three, their home games were played at Urmston Meadows in Urmston. They won the division in this their first season. In those days, the league didn't have a Premier Division, so Division 3 was the correct division number at the time they won it.

The title was won after finishing level on points with South Manchester, but below them on goal difference. However, the league had a play-off if teams finished on level points where divisional championship, promotion or relegation were concerned. So, the Division Three title was won by winning the Championship play-off against South Manchester.

They finished Division Two runners-up in 1969–70, two points behind Division Two champions - the original Cheadle Heath Nomads. This gained them promotion to Division One for the 1970–71 season.

Their time in Division One was short-lived as a next-to bottom finish in 1970-71 saw them return to Division Two. They returned to the top flight after another second-place finish, five points behind Division Two champions Old Urmstonians. Flixton's final season in the Lancashire & Cheshire Amateur League saw them finish fifth in Division One.

=== Manchester League - 1973-1986 ===
Flixton then moved to the Manchester League in 1973, finishing fourth in Division Two (the third level) in their first season in the league. There was no Division Two the following season, so they were moved to Division One and finished seventh in 1974–75, then third the following season and then fourth in 1976–77.

The 1977–78 season saw Flixton win promotion to the Manchester League Premier Division by winning the Division One title, five points clear of second placed Huntley. In their first Premier Division season, they finished 1978–79 as runners-up to Salford Amateurs. They just avoided relegation the following season 1979–80, finishing 14th of 16 teams, but recovered to finish fifth the following season.

Runners-up spot was achieved again in 1981–82, finishing five points behind Abbey Hey. Finishing third, fourth and seventh the next three seasons, they ended their spell in the Manchester League in 1985–86 with another runners-up spot, this time just two points behind Maine Road.

=== North West Counties League - 1986-1996 ===
In 1986, Flixton joined the North West Counties Football League, playing in Division Three in their first season in 1986–87 when they finished as runners-up. The following season, Division Three was absorbed into Division Two and the club again finished as runners-up, winning promotion to Division One. In their first season in Division One, they finished in seventh place. In 1993–94, they were relegated on goal difference. However, they bounced straight back up when they were Division Two champions the following season. They followed that up in 1995–96 by winning Division One and achieving promotion to the Northern Premier League Division One. They also reached the semi-finals of the FA Vase, where they lost to Brigg Town after starting the competition in the second qualifying round.

=== Northern Premier League - 1996-2000 ===
Flixton finished in 13th in their first season in the Northern Premier League in 1996–97, when they also reached the third qualifying round of the FA Cup. They again reached the third qualifying round of the FA Cup in 1998–99. However, in 1999–2000, they finished in 21st place and were relegated back to the North West Counties Football League Division One.

=== North West Counties League - 2000-2012 ===
Back in the North West Counties League, Flixton struggled in the following season, finishing in 20th place, just avoiding a second successive relegation. After another season of struggle in 2001–02, they were relegated back to Division Two in 2002–03 when the club's main sponsor, the managers and the first team players all left.

In 2003–04, they finished in fifth place in Division Two. The following season though they finished in 18th after having 21 points deducted. In 2005/06, current manager Alex Mortimer was club captain at this time, and they got promoted back to Division One (now called the Premier Division), finishing as runners-up. Along with taking them back up to the NWC Division One, Mortimer also captained the side to the NWC League Cup. In 2006–07, they finished in 13th place and also reached the fourth round of the FA Vase. In 2007–08, they finished in eighth place.

=== Return to competitive play 2026-2027 ===
The team would return to non-league for the 2026/2027 after having been reformed after the team was purchased by Christopher Garcia. The Team will Compete to the North West Counties League, and compete in Division one North.

== Management ==
Following the change in ownership, former club captain Alex Mortimer was appointed as manager, with Rhodri Giggs named assistant manager. Both appointments were seen as a move to strengthen ties between the club and its supporters by bringing in figures with local connections and experience in English football.

== Facilities and development ==
Flixton announced in March of 2025 plans for significant infrastructure improvements at Valley Road Stadium, including the installation of a state-of-the-art playing surface and the renovation of a two-story clubhouse. The development was presented as part of a broader strategy to modernise the club’s facilities while making them accessible to the local community.

== Community engagement ==
Alongside sporting ambitions, the club emphasised its commitment to revitalising local support and fostering grassroots football. Initiatives were outlined to increase youth participation, strengthen partnerships with schools and create a more inclusive matchday experience for residents.

== Stadium ==
Flixton first played at Urmston Meadows in Urmston before moving to Valley Road.

The Valley Road stadium has a capacity of around 2,000. For a time, it was used for home matches by Manchester City Ladies.

Various amateur and Sunday League sides have played home games at Valley Road, including AFC Flixton, Withington Posh, Unicorn Athletic and Broadheath Central, as well as North West Counties side Northwich Flixton Villa before their move to the Manchester Regional Arena. The ground is now once again home to Flixton and all their home games.

== Honours ==
- North West Counties Football League Division One champions: 1995–96
- North West Counties Football League Division Two champions: 1994–95
- Manchester League Division One champions: 1977/78
- Lancashire & Cheshire Amateur League Division Three champions: 1964–65
- FA Cup best performance: third qualifying round – 1996–97, 1998–99
- FA Trophy best performance: first round proper – 1998–99, 1999–00
- FA Vase best performance: semi-finals – 1995–96
