= Maghull F.C. =

Association football club in England

Coordinates: 53°30′30.51″N 2°56′27.78″W

Maghull
- Full name: Maghull Football Club
- Founded: 1921; 105 years ago
- Ground: DT Hughes Community Stadium, Hall Lane, Maghull
- Capacity: 700 (50 seated)
- Chairman: Ron Young
- Manager: Joe Burns
- League: North West Counties League Division One North
- 2025–26: North West Counties League Division One North, 4th of 18
Home colours	Away colours

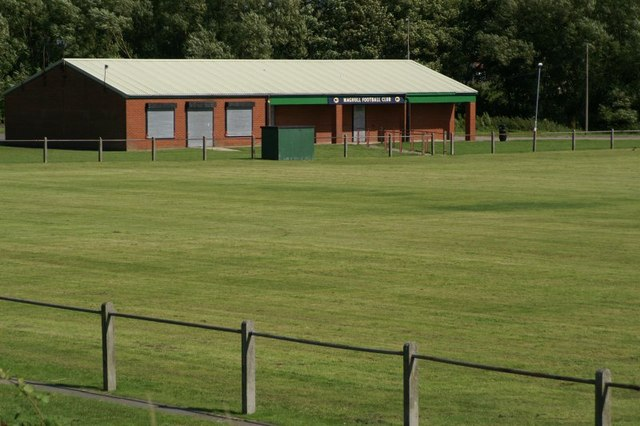
The club's home ground

Maghull Football Club are a football club based in Maghull, Merseyside, England. They are currently members of the North West Counties Football League Division One North, having previously played in the West Cheshire League Division One.

== History ==
Maghull were founded in 1921, and situated 8 miles north of Liverpool on the main A59 Preston Road, they played their home games at Deyes Lane, just one mile away from their present Old Hall Lane ground. They joined the Lancashire Combination in 1972 and then the Cheshire County League six years later. During this time they reached the third round of the FA Vase. In 1984 they became one of the founder members of the North West Counties League and were North West Counties Division 2 Champions in 1993 but were not promoted due to ground grading issues. Maghull joined the West Cheshire League Division One for the 1999–2000 season and played in that league until the 2023/2024 season, when they were promoted to the North West Counties League First Division North. They finished their first season back in the NWCL in a respectable 10th place, recording victories over Droylsden, Darwen and a 7-1 home win against Skelmersdale United during the 2024/25 season.

== Honours ==
- North West Counties League Division Two
  - Champions 1992–93
- West Cheshire League
  - Champions 2013–14
  - Runners-up 2006–07, 2010–11, 2023-24

== Records ==
- FA Vase
  - Third Round 1981–82

== Notable players ==
- Liam Watson (footballer)
- Neil Murphy
- Adam Hammill
- Connor Randall
