= Rochdale Town F.C. =

Coordinates: 53°35′30.80″N 2°11′21.20″W

Rochdale Town
- Full name: Rochdale Town Football Club
- Nickname: The Angels
- Founded: 1924 (as St. Gabriels)
- Dissolved: 2016; 10 years ago
- Ground: Mayfield Sports Centre
- Capacity: 1,500
Home colours	Away colours

Rochdale Town Football Club was an association football club based in Rochdale, Greater Manchester, England. They played home matches at Castleton Sports Centre, in Castleton, Rochdale, which had a capacity of 1,500. They were originally known as St Gabriels and then Castleton Gabriels, before adopting their final name. The club had a number of nicknames including the Angels, the Messengers, the Guardians, the Castlemen and the Garrison. They were full members of the Lancashire County Football Association. The club folded in 2016.

== History ==
The club was founded in Castleton as the church team of St Gabriel & the Angels in 1924, under the name St. Gabriel's F.C. Until the 1960s, the club's players had to be Catholic and regularly attend both church and Sunday school. Once these restrictions were lifted, the club began to win regional trophies. They played in the Rochdale Alliance League and moved to their present ground, Butterworth Park, (since renamed as Castleton Sports Centre) in 1979. They joined the Manchester Football League in 1984.

In 1990, the club's name was changed to Castleton Gabriels and they joined the North West Counties Football League Division Two for the 1990–91 season and finished their first season in the league in 11th place. They spent the next few seasons usually finishing in mid-table, with the 1995–96 season seeing the club achieve their highest league place to date, in 4th place. However, the 2000–01 season saw them finish in 17th out of twenty clubs. By the 2003–04 season they finished in last place, 20th, conceding 128 goals. Results did not improve the following season, when they were again in last place, conceding 111 goals. They were not relegated as the league was under-subscribed and there is no direct promotion to or relegation from the league. There were three spare places in Division Two. However, although there are six feeder leagues, none of the clubs that qualified for promotion were able to meet the ground requirements. They came close to being expelled from the league when their ground was deemed not to be of the required standard. They were though allowed to groundshare with Oldham Town. After improvement work was done they returned to their home ground in December 2005.

The 2005–06 season saw a third consecutive last place, conceding 122 goals, including a 10–2 defeat to FC United of Manchester at Gigg Lane on 10 December 2005. Their first win did not come until the latter part of the season, a 4–3 home victory over Darwen on 28 February 2006. They finished the season on just one point, having had a points deduction for registration irregularities and winning just two games all season.

In 2008 Gabriels changed their name to Rochdale Town to try to attract support and sponsors from the wider Rochdale area, rather than just Castleton. They also formed links with the major club of the town, Rochdale, who gave their blessing to the name change. They also adopted Rochdale's centenary kit of black and white stripes. Their first home game in the league as Rochdale Town was a 4–5 defeat at the start of the 2008–09 season to the newly formed AFC Liverpool on 16 August 2008.

At the end of the 2015–16 season, Rochdale Town were relegated to Step 7 due to ground grading issues. The club appealed against this decision, but the appeal was dismissed. The club then subsequently folded

== Attendances ==
=== Averages ===
The average league-game attendance at Castleton Sports Centre for the 2015–16 season was 28, placing Rochdale Town 18th for the division, and was a 31% decrease from the previous season.

Past averages:

- 2015–16: 27
- 2014–15: 40
- 2013–14: 39
- 2012–13: 34
- 2011–12: 38
- 2010–11: 40
- 2009–10: 33
- 2008–09: 44
- 2007–08: 30
- 2006–07: 37
- 2005–06: 175
- 2004–05: 37
- 2003–04: 31

Source: Tony Kempster's site Non League Matters NW Counties Football League site

== Records ==
- FA Cup
  - Preliminary Round 1994–95, 1995–96, 1996–97, 1997–98, 2000–01, 2001–02
- FA Vase
  - First Round 1997–98, 1999–2000, 2000–01, 2001–02
