= 1996–97 North West Counties Football League =

The 1996–97 North West Counties Football League season was the 15th in the history of the North West Counties Football League, a football competition in England.

The league comprised two divisions, Division One and Division Two (at levels 8 and 9 respectively of the English football league system), and there were additionally three cup competitions: the League Challenge Cup knockout competition, open to all the league's clubs; the Second Division Trophy, a knockout trophy competition for Division Two clubs only; and the Floodlit Trophy competition for all the league's clubs with floodlights. The league also had a reserves team section.

== Division One ==
North West Counties Football League Division One
- Season: 1996–97
- Teams: 22
- Champions: Trafford
- Promoted: Trafford
- Relegated: Bootle
- Matches: 462
- Goals: 1,422 (3.08 per match)

Division One featured featured 22 clubs, 20 remaining from the previous season plus 2 additions, both promoted from Division Two:

- Atherton Collieries, promoted as runners-up
- Vauxhall GM, promoted as champions

At the end of the season the leavers from the division were: the champions Trafford, automatically promoted to the Northern Premier League Division One; Penrith who transferred to the Northern League Division One; Eastwood Hanley who folded and left the league; and Bootle who suffered an enforced relegation to Division Two as their ground did not meet the requirements of Division One. Owing to the latter two departures both the bottom clubs were reprieved from relegation.

=== League table ===
Pos	Team	Pld	W	D	L	GF	GA	GD	Pts	Season End Notes
1	Trafford (C, P)	42	29	7	6	99	38	+61	94	Promoted to Northern Premier; League Division One
2	Newcastle Town	42	27	7	8	71	31	+40	88	
3	Clitheroe	42	23	14	5	75	36	+39	83	
4	Penrith	42	23	10	9	75	49	+26	79	Transferred to the Northern League Division One
5	Burscough	42	22	9	11	68	48	+20	75	
6	Eastwood Hanley	42	20	10	12	64	51	+13	70	Club folded
7	Mossley	42	20	8	14	79	58	+21	68	
8	Blackpool Rovers	42	17	16	9	70	47	+23	67	
9	Prescot Cables	42	17	11	14	68	60	+8	62	
10	Vauxhall GM	42	14	15	13	70	69	+1	57	
11	Nantwich Town	42	14	11	17	74	74	0	53	
12	Glossop North End	42	14	11	17	56	67	−11	53	
13	Bootle (R)	42	15	8	19	61	73	−12	53	Relegated (ground grading) to Division Two
14	St Helens Town	42	14	6	22	65	79	−14	48	
15	Atherton Collieries	42	12	9	21	63	85	−22	45	
16	Kidsgrove Athletic	42	10	14	18	53	73	−20	44	
17	Rossendale United	42	11	9	22	51	76	−25	42	
18	Chadderton	42	10	11	21	49	80	−31	41	
19	Holker Old Boys	42	10	9	23	60	80	−20	39	
20	Maine Road	42	9	11	22	49	85	−36	38	
21	Darwen	42	9	10	23	49	81	−32	37	
22	Salford City	42	8	12	22	53	82	−29	36	

Source: NWCFL: Final Tables, Season 1996/97
Rules for classification: 1) points; 2) goal difference; 3) number of goals scored.
(C) Champions; (P) Promoted; (R) Relegated

== Division Two ==
North West Counties Football League Division Two
- Season: 1996–97
- Teams: 20
- Champions: Ramsbottom United
- Promoted: Haslingden; Ramsbottom United
- Relegated: None
- Matches: 380
- Goals: 1,299 (3.42 per match)

Division Two featured featured 20 clubs, 16 remaining from the previous season plus 4 additions:

- Garswood United, promoted as champions of the Mid-Cheshire League Division One
- Leek CSOB, promoted as champions of the Midland League
- Skelmersdale United, relegated from Division One
- Colne, a newly formed club

At the end of the season the champions Ramsbottom United (who had joined the league the previous season) and runners-up Haslingden (who were denied promotion three seasons previously on ground grading issues) were promoted to Division One. For the first occasion two Division Two clubs, Ramsbottom United with 100 and Tetley Walker with 105, both scored at least a century of goals over the season. The latter club were involved in setting a new league single match total goal record of 17 on 5 May 1997 when they defeated Nelson 15–2. The bottom two clubs, potentially subject to demotion, both remained in the division.

=== League table ===
Pos	Team	Pld	W	D	L	GF	GA	GD	Pts	Season End Notes
1	Ramsbottom United (C, P)	38	27	6	5	100	34	+66	87	Promoted to Division One
2	Haslingden (P)	38	27	6	5	90	32	+58	87	Promoted to Division One
3	Garswood United	38	26	5	7	90	38	+52	83	
4	Tetley Walker	38	24	5	9	105	58	+47	77	
5	Castleton Gabriels	38	22	8	8	78	39	+39	74	
6	Leek County School Old Boys	38	22	7	9	67	49	+18	73	
7	Formby	38	21	6	11	86	57	+29	69	
8	Maghull	38	17	7	14	52	50	+2	58	
9	Cheadle Town	38	15	8	15	59	63	−4	53	
10	Skelmersdale United	38	14	10	14	72	66	+6	52	
11	Nelson	38	14	10	14	64	72	−8	52	
12	Stantondale	38	11	12	15	59	69	−10	45	
13	Middlewich Athletic	38	13	6	19	54	65	−11	45	
14	Squires Gate	38	12	4	22	44	79	−35	40	
15	Daisy Hill	38	10	5	23	47	76	−29	35	
16	Bacup Borough	38	9	6	23	48	83	−35	33	
17	Ashton Town	38	6	14	18	53	77	−24	32	
18	Blackpool Mechanics	38	7	5	26	48	88	−40	26	
19	Oldham Town	38	6	7	25	48	113	−65	25	
20	Colne	38	6	5	27	35	91	−56	23	

Source: NWCFL: Final Tables, Season 1996/97
Rules for classification: 1) points; 2) goal difference; 3) number of goals scored.
(C) Champions; (P) Promoted

== League Challenge Cup ==
The 1996–97 League Challenge Cup was a knockout competition open to all the league's clubs. The final between the two leading Division One clubs, played at Bury F.C., was won 2–1 by Newcastle Town who defeated Trafford the therefore denied them the league and cup double.

Semi-finals and Final

The semi-finals were decided on aggregate score from two legs played

Semi-finals
Newcastle Town (D1)	1	4	5
Penrith (D1)	0	2	2
Nantwich Town (D1)	0	2	2
Trafford (D1)	2	3	5

Final (Note: Played at Bury F.C.)
Newcastle Town (D1)	2
Trafford (D1)	1

Club's division appended to team name: (D1)=Division One
sources:

- Semi-finals: "Semi-pro Results, Scorers and Tables: NWC league Cup: Semi Final 2nd Leg". Manchester Evening News. Manchester. 31 March 1997. p. 37.
- Final: "Tough For Trafford in League Cup Final". Manchester Evening News: Pink Final. Manchester. 26 April 1997. p. 11.

== Second Division Trophy ==
The 1996–97 Second Division Trophy was a knockout competition for Division Two clubs only. The winners were Nelson who defeated league newcomers Garswood United 1–0 in the final played at Darwen F.C.

Semi-finals and Final

The semi-finals were decided on aggregate score from two legs played

Semi-finals
Garswood United	0	1 (Note: After extra time, score at 90 minutes: 0–0)	1
Castleton Gabriels	0	0	0
Nelson	1	3 (Note: After extra time, score at 90 minutes: 2–2)	3 (Note: Nelson won on the away goal rule)
Bacup Borough	1	4	5

Final (Note: Played at Darwen F.C.)
Garswood United	0
Nelson	1

sources:

- Semi-finals: "Semi-pro Soccer – Results, Scorers, Tables: NWCL Div 2 Trophy Semi Finals 2nd Legs". Manchester Evening News. Manchester. 17 March 1997. p. 41.
- Final: George Embley (25 April 1997). "Matt Finish: Shiels goal brings cup glory to Victoria Park". Nelson Leader. Wigan. p. 46.

== Floodlit Trophy ==
The 1996–97 Floodlit Trophy was a competition open to all the league's clubs with floodlights. The final was played at Clitheroe F.C.and featured Division One clubs at the north and south ends of the area covered by the league. The winners were Penrith (who were shortly to transfer away from the league) they defeated Newcastle Town – who were thus denied a League Challenge and Floodlit cup double and a third Floodlit Trophy win. It was Penrith's second win in the competition, having won it two seasons previously.

== Reserves Section ==
Main honours for the 1996–97 season:

- Reserves Division
  - Winners: Trafford Reserves
  - Runners-up: Clitheroe Reserves
- Reserves Division Cup
  - Winners: Trafford Reserves
  - Runners-up: Clitheroe Reserves
