= 1995–96 North West Counties Football League =

The 1995–96 North West Counties Football League season was the 14th in the history of the North West Counties Football League, a football competition in England.

The League which was not sponsored this season comprised two divisions, Division One and Division Two (at levels 8 and 9 respectively of the English football league system). There were additionally three cup competitions: the League Challenge Cup knockout competition, open to all the league's clubs; the Second Division Trophy, a knockout trophy competition for Division Two clubs only; and the Floodlit Trophy competition for all the league's clubs with floodlights. The league also had a reserves team section.

== Division One ==
North West Counties Football League Division One
- Season: 1995–96
- Teams: 22
- Champions: Flixton
- Promoted: Flixton
- Relegated: Skelmersdale United
- Matches: 462
- Goals: 1,422 (3.08 per match)

Division One featured 22 clubs, 20 remaining from the previous season plus 2 additions:

- Flixton, promoted as champions of Division Two (returning to Division One after relegation two seasons previously)
- Mossley relegated from the NPL Division One

At the end of the season the champions Flixton, earning their second promotion in two seasons, were automatically promoted to the Northern Premier League Division One. As no club was relegated into the league from the Northern Premier League Division One only one club, Skelmersdale United, were relegated to Division Two.

=== League table ===
Pos	Team	Pld	W	D	L	GF	GA	GD	Pts	Season End Notes
1	Flixton (C, P)	42	28	8	6	85	30	+55	92	Promoted to Northern Premier; League Division One
2	Newcastle Town	42	26	7	9	88	42	+46	85	
3	Trafford	42	26	5	11	89	45	+44	83	
4	Mossley	42	24	8	10	87	59	+28	80	
5	Burscough	42	23	8	11	77	40	+37	77	
6	Bootle	42	23	5	14	74	55	+19	74	
7	Clitheroe	42	20	12	10	63	44	+19	72	
8	St Helens Town	42	19	13	10	71	53	+18	70	
9	Nantwich Town	42	20	7	15	64	59	+5	67	
10	Prescot Cables	42	17	11	14	70	66	+4	62	
11	Holker Old Boys	42	19	4	19	77	72	+5	61	
12	Glossop North End	42	15	15	12	55	48	+7	60	
13	Kidsgrove Athletic	42	15	9	18	61	64	−3	54	
14	Eastwood Hanley	42	12	15	15	60	57	+3	51	
15	Maine Road	42	12	14	16	60	71	−11	50	
16	Chadderton	42	14	8	20	52	69	−17	50	
17	Blackpool Rovers	42	11	9	22	49	74	−25	42	
18	Penrith	42	9	12	21	57	69	−12	39	
19	Darwen	42	9	10	23	57	77	−20	37	
20	Salford City	42	10	5	27	49	93	−44	35	
21	Rossendale United	42	6	10	26	32	114	−82	28	
22	Skelmersdale United (R)	42	5	3	34	45	121	−76	18	Relegated to Division Two

Source: NWCFL: Final Tables, Season 1995/96
Rules for classification: 1) points; 2) goal difference; 3) number of goals scored.
(C) Champions; (P) Promoted; (R) Relegated

== Division Two ==
North West Counties Football League Division Two
- Season: 1995–96
- Teams: 18
- Champions: Vauxhall GM
- Promoted: Atherton Collieries; Vauxhall GM
- Relegated: None
- Matches: 306
- Goals: 1,136 (3.71 per match)

Division Two featured featured 18 clubs, 14 remaining from the previous season plus 4 additions:

- Bacup Borough, relegated from Division One
- Middlewich Athletic, joined from the Mid-Cheshire Football League
- Ramsbottom United, joined from the Manchester Football League
- Vauxhall GM, joined from the West Cheshire League – returning to the league after stepping down from Division One three years previously.

At the end of the season Vauxhall GM and Atherton Collieries as the champions and runners-up respectively were promoted to Division One. The bottom two clubs, potentially subject to demotion, both remained in the division.

=== League table ===
Pos	Team	Pld	W	D	L	GF	GA	GD	Pts	Season End Notes
1	Vauxhall GM (C, P)	34	28	4	2	112	25	+87	88	Promoted to Division One
2	Atherton Collieries (P)	34	25	5	4	90	43	+47	80	Promoted to Division One
3	Tetley Walker	34	22	7	5	75	35	+40	73	
4	Castleton Gabriels	34	19	5	10	77	52	+25	62	
5	Nelson	34	17	9	8	78	55	+23	60	
6	Cheadle Town	34	17	5	12	67	49	+18	56	
7	Haslingden	34	15	9	10	69	45	+24	54	
8	Maghull	34	16	3	15	55	42	+13	51	
9	Oldham Town	34	14	8	12	75	74	+1	50	
10	Middlewich Athletic	34	12	7	15	45	74	−29	43	
11	Daisy Hill	34	12	4	18	46	66	−20	40	
12	Ramsbottom United	34	11	6	17	60	65	−5	39	
13	Formby	34	10	7	17	59	76	−17	37	
14	Stantondale	34	11	4	19	47	75	−28	37	
15	Blackpool Mechanics	34	8	8	18	56	74	−18	32	
16	Ashton Town	34	8	3	23	53	102	−49	27	
17	Squires Gate	34	5	7	22	37	82	−45	22	
18	Bacup Borough	34	4	3	27	35	102	−67	15	

Source: NWCFL: Final Tables, Season 1995/96
Rules for classification: 1) points; 2) goal difference; 3) number of goals scored.
(C) Champions; (P) Promoted

== League Challenge Cup ==
The 1995–96 League Challenge Cup was a knockout competition open to all the league's clubs. The final featuring Division One clubs, played at Bury F.C., was won by Burscough who defeated Flixton (denying them a league and cup double) 1–0. Burscough were the second club to win the trophy twice (emulating Warrington Town) having won it three seasons previously.

Semi-finals and Final

The semi-finals were decided on aggregate score from two legs played

Semi-finals
Burscough (D1)	3	1	4
Holker Old Boys (D1)	0	3	3
Newcastle Town (D1)	0	0	0
Flixton (D1)	0	3	3

Final (Note: Played at Bury F.C.)
Burscough (D1)	1
Flixton (D1)	0

Club's division appended to team name: (D1)=Division One
sources:

- Semi-finals: "Semi-pro soccer round-up: NW Counties Lge Cup: Semi-finals 2nd Leg". Manchester Evening News. Manchester. 15 April 1996. p. 45.
- Final: John Williams (4 May 1996). "Burscough milestone is marked with final delight". Football Echo. Liverpool. p. 22.

== Second Division Trophy ==
The 1995–96 Second Division Trophy was a knockout competition for Division Two clubs only. The winners were league newcomers Ramsbottom United who defeated Cheadle Town 2–1 in the final played at Darwen F.C.

Semi-finals and Final

The semi-finals were decided on aggregate score from two legs played

Semi-finals
Castleton Gabriels	2	2 (Note: After extra time, score at 90 minutes: 1–2)	4
Cheadle Town	1	4	5
Middlewich Athletic	0	2	2
Ramsbottom United	2	5	7

Final (Note: Played at Darwen F.C.)
Cheadle Town	1
Ramsbottom United	2

sources:

- Semi-finals: "Semi-pro Soccer Round-up: NWCL Div 2 Cup Semi Final 2nd Leg". Manchester Evening News. Manchester. 18 March 1996. p. 41.; "Semi-pro Soccer Round-up: NWCL Div 2 Cup Semi Final 2nd Leg". Manchester Evening News. Manchester. 25 March 1996. p. 41.
- Final: "Rosy for Rammy". Manchester Evening News. Manchester. 19 April 1996. p. 84.

== Floodlit Trophy ==
The 1995–96 Floodlit Trophy was a competition open to all the league's clubs with floodlights. In the all Division One club final Newcastle Town defeated Mossley 2–1 in the match played at Altrincham F.C.

== Reserves Section ==
Main honours for the 1995–96 season:

- Reserves Division
  - Winners: Flixton Reserves
  - Runners-up: St Helens Town Reserves
- Reserves Division Cup
  - Winners: Castleton Gabriels Reserves
  - Runners-up: Nelson Reserves
