= 1996–97 FA Cup =

Tournament details
- Country: England; Wales

Final positions
- Champions: Chelsea (2nd title)
- Runners-up: Middlesbrough

Tournament statistics
- Top goal scorer(s): Ken Charlery; Duane Darby; Bryan Hughes; Fabrizio Ravanelli (6 goals)

The 1996–97 FA Cup (known as the FA Cup sponsored by Littlewoods for sponsorship reasons) was the 116th season of the FA Cup. The tournament started in August 1996 for clubs from non-league football and the competition proper started in October 1996 for teams from the Premier League and the Football League.

Premier League side Manchester United were the defending champions, but were eliminated in the fourth round by Wimbledon.

The tournament was won by Chelsea with a 2–0 victory over Middlesbrough in the final at Wembley stadium.

== Calendar ==
Round	Initial Matches	New Entries	Clubs
Preliminary round	Saturday 31 August 1996	340	574 → 404
First round qualifying	Saturday 14 September 1996	118	404 → 260
Second round qualifying	Saturday 28 September 1996	none	260 → 188
Third round qualifying	Saturday 12 October 1996	none	188 → 152
Fourth round qualifying	Saturday 26 October 1996	20	152 → 124
First round proper	Saturday 16 November 1996	52	124 → 84
Second round proper	Saturday 7 December 1996	none	84 → 64
Third round proper	Saturday 4 January 1997	44	64 → 32
Fourth round proper	Saturday 25 January 1997	none	32 → 16
Fifth round proper	Saturday 15 February 1997	none	16 → 8
Sixth round proper	Saturday 8 March 1997	none	8 → 4
Semi-finals	Sunday 13 April 1997	none	4 → 2
Final	Saturday 17 May 1997	none	2 → 1

== Qualifying rounds ==
Most participating clubs that were not members of the Premier League or Football League competed in the qualifying rounds to secure one of 28 places available in the first round.

The winners from the fourth qualifying round were Kidderminster Harriers, Consett, Stalybridge Celtic, Boston United, Hednesford Town, Newcastle Town, Runcorn, Colwyn Bay, Whitby Town, Southport, Altrincham, Morecambe, Shepshed Dynamo, Merthyr Tydfil, Wisbech Town, Cheltenham Town, Hendon, Bromley, Ashford Town (Kent), St Albans City, Rushden & Diamonds, Welling United, Boreham Wood, Hayes, Farnborough Town, Stevenage Borough, Dagenham & Redbridge and Sudbury Town.

Newcastle Town and Sudbury Town were appearing in the competition proper for the first time while, of the others, Hendon had not featured at this stage since 1988–89, Whitby Town had not done so since 1986-87, Shepshed Dynamo had not done so since 1982-83, Boreham Wood had not done so since 1977-78, Bromley since 1976-77, Consett since 1958-59 and Hednesford Town since 1919-20.

In Hednesford Town's only previous appearance in the competition proper, they became one of the first two clubs to participate in nine rounds of one Cup tournament. This season, they featured in eight rounds of the competition - after defeating Wednesfield, Evesham United, Tamworth and Telford United in the qualifying rounds, they accounted for Southport, Blackpool and York City in the main draw before going out to Premier League side Middlesbrough in the fourth round in a match played at Riverside Stadium despite Hednesford being the designated "home" team.

== First round proper ==
The 48 teams from the Football League Second and Third Division entered in this round along with the 28 non-league qualifiers and Macclesfield Town, Northwich Victoria, Woking and Enfield who were given byes. The draw for this round included four teams from the various competitions at Step 8 of English football: Whitby Town and Consett from the Northern League First Division, Newcastle Town from the North West Counties League First Division and Wisbech Town from the Eastern Counties League Premier Division. This was a rare season in which more clubs from Step 8 than from Step 7 qualified for the first round.

The matches were played on 16 November 1996. There were thirteen replays, with two ties requiring a penalty shootout to settle them. Sudbury Town's shock penalty shootout win over Brighton & Hove Albion capped off the last FA Cup match ever played at the Goldstone Ground.

Tie no	Home team	Score	Away team	Date
1	Ashford Town (Kent) (6)	2–2	Dagenham & Redbridge (6)	16 November 1996
Replay	Dagenham & Redbridge	1–1	Ashford Town (Kent)	25 November 1996
Ashford Town (Kent) won 4–3 on penalties
2	Blackpool	1–0	Wigan Athletic	16 November 1996
3	Chester City	3–0	Stalybridge Celtic (5)	16 November 1996
4	Chesterfield	1–0	Bury	16 November 1996
5	Burnley	2–1	Lincoln City	16 November 1996
6	Preston North End	4–1	Altrincham (5)	16 November 1996
7	Wisbech Town (8)	1–2	St Albans City (6)	16 November 1996
8	Woking	2–2	Millwall	15 November 1996
Replay	Millwall	0–1	Woking (5)	26 November 1996
9	Gillingham	1–0	Hereford United	16 November 1996
10	Boreham Wood (6)	1–1	Rushden & Diamonds (5)	16 November 1996
Replay	Rushden & Diamonds	2–3	Boreham Wood	26 November 1996
11	Northwich Victoria (5)	2–2	Walsall	16 November 1996
Replay	Walsall	3–1	Northwich Victoria	26 November 1996
12	Macclesfield Town (5)	0–2	Rochdale	16 November 1996
13	Crewe Alexandra	4–1	Kidderminster Harriers (5)	16 November 1996
14	Shrewsbury Town	1–1	Scarborough	16 November 1996
Replay	Scarborough	1–0	Shrewsbury Town	26 November 1996
15	Wrexham	1–1	Colwyn Bay (6)	16 November 1996
Replay	Wrexham	2–0	Colwyn Bay	26 November 1996
16	Hednesford Town (5)	2–1	Southport (5)	16 November 1996
17	Stockport County	2–1	Doncaster Rovers	16 November 1996
18	Brentford	2–0	AFC Bournemouth	16 November 1996
19	Bristol Rovers	1–2	Exeter City	16 November 1996
20	Northampton Town	0–1	Watford	17 November 1996
21	Bromley (6)	1–3	Enfield (6)	16 November 1996
22	Plymouth Argyle	5–0	Fulham	16 November 1996
23	Carlisle United	6–0	Shepshed Dynamo (7)	16 November 1996
24	Scunthorpe United	4–1	Rotherham United	16 November 1996
25	Mansfield Town	4–0	Consett (8)	16 November 1996
26	Cardiff City	2–0	Hendon (6)	16 November 1996
27	Runcorn (6)	1–4	Darlington	16 November 1996
28	Torquay United	0–1	Luton Town	16 November 1996
29	Boston United (6)	3–0	Morecambe (5)	16 November 1996
30	Peterborough United	0–0	Cheltenham Town (6)	16 November 1996
Replay	Cheltenham Town	1–3	Peterborough United	27 November 1996
31	Colchester United	1–2	Wycombe Wanderers	16 November 1996
32	Leyton Orient	2–1	Merthyr Tydfil (6)	16 November 1996
33	Sudbury Town (6)	0–0	Brighton & Hove Albion	16 November 1996
Replay	Brighton & Hove Albion	1–1	Sudbury Town	26 November 1996
Sudbury Town won 4–3 on penalties
34	Whitby Town (8)	0–0	Hull City	17 November 1996
Replay	Hull City	8–4	Whitby Town	26 November 1996
35	Cambridge United	3–0	Welling United (5)	16 November 1996
36	Swansea City	1–1	Bristol City	16 November 1996
Replay	Bristol City	1–0	Swansea City	26 November 1996
37	Farnborough Town (5)	2–2	Barnet	16 November 1996
Replay	Barnet	1–0	Farnborough Town	26 November 1996
38	Hartlepool United	0–0	York City	16 November 1996
Replay	York City	3–0	Hartlepool United	26 November 1996
39	Stevenage Borough (5)	2–2	Hayes (5)	16 November 1996
Replay	Hayes	0–2	Stevenage Borough	26 November 1996
40	Newcastle Town (8)	0–2	Notts County	17 November 1996

== Second round proper ==
The second round of the competition featured the winners of the first round ties. The matches were played on 7 December 1996, with four replays and one penalty shootout required. The round included six clubs from Step 6 of the football pyramid: Enfield, St Albans City and Boreham Wood from the Isthmian League Premier Division, Ashford Town (Kent) and Sudbury Town from the Southern League Premier Division and Boston United from the Northern Premier League Premier Division. Similarly to the first round, this was a rare instance in which more teams from Step 6 than from Step 5 qualified for this stage (although all of the Step 5 teams and none of the Step 6 teams progressed through to the next round).

Tie no	Home team	Score	Away team	Date
1	Enfield (6)	1–1	Peterborough United	7 December 1996
Replay	Peterborough United	4–1	Enfield	17 December 1996
2	Blackpool	0–1	Hednesford Town (5)	7 December 1996
3	Chester City	1–0	Boston United (6)	7 December 1996
4	Chesterfield	2–0	Scarborough	7 December 1996
5	Barnet	3–3	Wycombe Wanderers	7 December 1996
Replay	Wycombe Wanderers	3–2	Barnet	17 December 1996
6	Bristol City	9–2	St Albans City (6)	7 December 1996
7	Preston North End	2–3	York City	7 December 1996
8	Watford	5–0	Ashford Town (Kent) (6)	7 December 1996
9	Walsall	1–1	Burnley	7 December 1996
Replay	Burnley	1–1	Walsall	23 December 1996
Burnley won 4–2 on penalties
10	Notts County	3–1	Rochdale	7 December 1996
11	Luton Town	2–1	Boreham Wood (6)	7 December 1996
12	Wrexham	2–2	Scunthorpe United	7 December 1996
Replay	Scunthorpe United	2–3	Wrexham	17 December 1996
13	Plymouth Argyle	4–1	Exeter City	6 December 1996
14	Hull City	1–5	Crewe Alexandra	7 December 1996
15	Carlisle United	1–0	Darlington	7 December 1996
16	Mansfield Town	0–3	Stockport County	7 December 1996
17	Cardiff City	0–2	Gillingham	7 December 1996
18	Leyton Orient	1–2	Stevenage Borough (5)	7 December 1996
19	Sudbury Town (6)	1–3	Brentford	7 December 1996
20	Cambridge United	0–2	Woking (5)	7 December 1996

== Third round proper ==
The 44 teams from the Premier League and the Football League First Division entered the competition at this stage. Due to adverse weather conditions, the initial matches were played on various dates between 4-21 January 1997. There were nine replays, with no penalty shootouts required. Hednesford Town, Stevenage Borough and Woking from the Football Conference (Step 5) were the lowest-ranked teams in the draw.

Tie no	Home team	Score	Away team	Date
1	Chesterfield (3)	2–0	Bristol City (3)	14 January 1997
2	Liverpool (1)	1–0	Burnley (3)	4 January 1997
3	Watford (3)	2–0	Oxford United (2)	21 January 1997
4	Reading (2)	3–1	Southampton (1)	4 January 1997
5	Gillingham (3)	0–2	Derby County (1)	21 January 1997
6	Leicester City (1)	2–0	Southend United (2)	15 January 1997
7	Notts County (3)	0–0	Aston Villa (1)	14 January 1997
Replay	Aston Villa	3–0	Notts County	22 January 1997
8	Nottingham Forest (1)	3–0	Ipswich Town (2)	4 January 1997
9	Blackburn Rovers (1)	1–0	Port Vale (2)	4 January 1997
10	Sheffield Wednesday (1)	7–1	Grimsby Town (2)	4 January 1997
11	Wolverhampton Wanderers (2)	1–2	Portsmouth (2)	4 January 1997
12	Crewe Alexandra (3)	1–1	Wimbledon (1)	14 January 1997
Replay	Wimbledon	2–0	Crewe Alexandra	21 January 1997
13	Middlesbrough (1)	6–0	Chester City (4)	4 January 1997
14	Luton Town (3)	1–1	Bolton Wanderers (2)	21 January 1997
Replay	Bolton Wanderers	6–2	Luton Town	25 January 1997
15	Everton (1)	3–0	Swindon Town (2)	5 January 1997
16	Wrexham (3)	1–1	West Ham United (1)	4 January 1997
Replay	West Ham United	0–1	Wrexham	25 January 1997
17	Hednesford Town (5)	1–0	York City (3)	13 January 1997
18	Wycombe Wanderers (3)	0–2	Bradford City (2)	5 January 1997
19	Queens Park Rangers (2)	1–1	Huddersfield Town (2)	4 January 1997
Replay	Huddersfield Town	1–2	Queens Park Rangers	14 January 1997
20	Barnsley (2)	2–0	Oldham Athletic (2)	14 January 1997
21	Brentford (3)	0–1	Manchester City (2)	25 January 1997
22	Coventry City (1)	1–1	Woking (5)	25 January 1997
Replay	Woking	1–2	Coventry City	4 February 1997
23	Manchester United (1)	2–0	Tottenham Hotspur (1)	5 January 1997
24	Norwich City (2)	1–0	Sheffield United (2)	4 January 1997
25	Plymouth Argyle (3)	0–1	Peterborough United (3)	4 January 1997
26	Carlisle United (4)	1–0	Tranmere Rovers (2)	14 January 1997
27	Crystal Palace (2)	2–2	Leeds United (1)	14 January 1997
Replay	Leeds United	1–0	Crystal Palace	25 January 1997
28	Chelsea (1)	3–0	West Bromwich Albion (2)	4 January 1997
29	Charlton Athletic (2)	1–1	Newcastle United (1)	5 January 1997
Replay	Newcastle United	2–1	Charlton Athletic	15 January 1997
30	Arsenal (1)	1–1	Sunderland (1)	4 January 1997
Replay	Sunderland	0–2	Arsenal	15 January 1997
31	Stoke City (2)	0–2	Stockport County (3)	15 January 1997
32	Birmingham City (2)	2–0	Stevenage Borough (5)	4 January 1997

== Fourth round proper ==
The fourth round ties featured the thirty-two winners from the previous round. The matches were originally scheduled for Saturday, 25 January 1997, although six matches were played on later dates. There was only one replay. Hednesford Town was again the lowest-ranked team in the draw and was, by this stage, the last non-league club left in the competition.

Tie no	Home team	Score	Away team	Date
1	Leicester City	2–1	Norwich City	25 January 1997
2	Blackburn Rovers	1–2	Coventry City	15 February 1997
3	Bolton Wanderers	2–3	Chesterfield	4 February 1997
4	Hednesford Town (5)	2–3	Middlesbrough	25 January 1997
5	Derby County	3–1	Aston Villa	25 January 1997
6	Everton	2–3	Bradford City	25 January 1997
7	Newcastle United	1–2	Nottingham Forest	26 January 1997
8	Manchester City	3–1	Watford	5 February 1997
9	Queens Park Rangers	3–2	Barnsley	25 January 1997
10	Portsmouth	3–0	Reading	25 January 1997
11	Manchester United	1–1	Wimbledon	25 January 1997
Replay	Wimbledon	1–0	Manchester United	4 February 1997
12	Carlisle United	0–2	Sheffield Wednesday	25 January 1997
13	Chelsea	4–2	Liverpool	26 January 1997
14	Arsenal	0–1	Leeds United	4 February 1997
15	Peterborough United	2–4	Wrexham	4 February 1997
16	Birmingham City	3–1	Stockport County	25 January 1997

== Fifth round proper ==
The fifth-round matches were scheduled for Saturday, 15 February 1997. There was, again, only one replay. Chesterfield and Wrexham, from the Second Division, were the lowest-ranked teams in the draw.

Tie no	Home team	Score	Away team	Date
1	Chesterfield	1–0	Nottingham Forest	15 February 1997
2	Leicester City	2–2	Chelsea	16 February 1997
Replay	Chelsea	1–0	Leicester City	26 February 1997
3	Derby County	3–2	Coventry City	26 February 1997
4	Manchester City	0–1	Middlesbrough	15 February 1997
5	Bradford City	0–1	Sheffield Wednesday	16 February 1997
6	Wimbledon	2–1	Queens Park Rangers	15 February 1997
7	Leeds United	2–3	Portsmouth	15 February 1997
8	Birmingham City	1–3	Wrexham	15 February 1997

== Sixth round proper ==
The sixth round ties were scheduled for the weekend of 8–9 March. No replays were required.

Chesterfield defeated Wrexham 1–0 in a rare "all-Third Tier" quarter-final clash, while Middlesbrough's 2–0 win at Derby County moved them a step closer to their first-ever FA Cup final.

9 March 1997
11:30 GMT

Chesterfield	1–0	Wrexham
Beaumont 58'	Report

Saltergate, Chesterfield
Attendance: 8,735
Referee: Mike Riley

9 March 1997
13:30 GMT

Portsmouth	1–4	Chelsea
Burton 82'	Report	M. Hughes 25'; Wise 43' 86'; Zola 56'

Fratton Park, Portsmouth
Attendance: 15,071
Referee: Jeff Winter

9 March 1997
16:10 GMT

Sheffield Wednesday	0–2	Wimbledon
	Report	Earle 74'; Holdsworth 90+1'

Hillsborough, Sheffield
Attendance: 25,032
Referee: Roger Dilkes

8 March 1997
15:00 GMT

Derby County	0–2	Middlesbrough
	Report	Juninho 39'; Ravanelli 90'

Baseball Ground, Derby
Attendance: 17,567
Referee: Graham Poll

== Semi-finals ==
The semi-final ties were played at neutral venues on 13 April 1997. Middlesbrough and Chelsea came through their ties (with Middlesbrough requiring a replay against Second Division side Chesterfield) to reach the final.

Wimbledon, playing the semi-finals for the first time since they were FA Cup winners nine years earlier, had their hopes of FA Cup glory ended by a semi-final defeat at the hands of Chelsea. This came just weeks after Wimbledon had been eliminated from the League Cup semi-finals.

Middlesbrough, on the other hand, reached the FA Cup final for the first time in their history, but only after a 3–0 replay win over a Chesterfield side that had given them a serious run for their money in the first match. Chesterfield narrowly missed out on becoming the first third-tier side to reach the FA Cup final after an exciting match ended in a 3–3 draw. The Spireites took a 2–0 lead in the second half and had a goal controversially ruled out despite the ball appearing to cross the line (video evidence is inconclusive), which would have seen them go 3–1 up.

13 April 1997
12:00 BST

Chelsea	3–0	Wimbledon
Hughes 43' 90'; Zola 64'	Report

Highbury, London
Attendance: 32,674
Referee: Gerald Ashby

13 April 1997
15:00 BST

Middlesbrough	3–3	Chesterfield
Ravanelli 64'; Hignett 70' (pen.); Festa 100'	Report	Morris 54'; Dyche 60' (pen.); Hewitt 119'

Old Trafford, Manchester
Attendance: 49,640
Referee: David Elleray

Replay

22 April 1997
19:45 BST

Chesterfield	0–3	Middlesbrough
	Report	Beck 12'; Ravanelli 57'; Emerson 89'

Hillsborough, Sheffield
Attendance: 30,339
Referee: David Elleray

== Final ==
The 1997 FA Cup Final took place on 17 May 1997 at Wembley Stadium. Chelsea were attempting to win the FA Cup for the first time in 27 years, while Middlesbrough were contesting their first ever FA Cup final, having only just competed in their first ever League Cup final one month earlier. Chelsea took to the field on the back of something of a renaissance under Dutch manager Ruud Gullit, having recorded their best league finish for a decade. Middlesbrough, on the other hand, began the final having been relegated from the Premier League and had also been losing finalists in the League Cup.

Chelsea beat Middlesbrough 2–0, with Roberto Di Matteo scoring the fastest goal in FA Cup Final history, 43 seconds after kick-off. This beat Jackie Milburn's record from the 1955 FA Cup Final, who scored after 45 seconds. Di Matteo's record was then beaten in 2009 (coincidentally against Chelsea) by Everton's Louis Saha (27.9 seconds). Eddie Newton scored the Blues' second goal in the 83rd minute to clinch the match and give Chelsea their first major trophy in 26 years.

17 May 1997
15:00 BST

Chelsea	2–0	Middlesbrough
Di Matteo 1'; Newton 83'	Report

Wembley, London
Attendance: 79,160
Referee: Stephen Lodge (South Yorkshire)

== Media coverage ==
For the ninth consecutive season in the United Kingdom, the BBC were the free to air broadcasters which was their last before ITV took over while Sky Sports were the subscription broadcasters.

The matches shown live on the BBC were:

• Manchester United 2-0 Tottenham Hotspur (R3)

• Chelsea 4-2 Liverpool (R4)

• Leicester City 2-2 Chelsea (R5)

• Sheffield Wednesday 0-2 Wimbledon (QF)

• Chelsea 3-0 Wimbledon (SF)

• Chelsea 2-0 Middlesbrough (Final)

The matches shown live on Sky Sports were:

• Woking 2-2 Millwall (R1)

• Northampton Town 0-1 Watford (R1)

• Millwall 0-1 Woking (R1 Replay)

• Plymouth Argyle 4-1 Exeter City (R2)

• Cardiff City 0-2 Gillingham (R2)

• Wycombe Wanderers 3-2 Barnet (R2 Replay)

• Charlton Athletic 1-1 Newcastle United (R3)

• Sunderland 0-2 Arsenal (R3 Replay)

• Newcastle United 1-2 Nottingham Forest (R4)

• Wimbledon 1-0 Manchester United (R4 Replay)

• Bradford City 0-1 Sheffield Wednesday (R5)

• Chelsea 1-0 Leicester City (R5 Replay)

• Portsmouth 1-4 Chelsea (QF)

• Middlesbrough 3-3 Chesterfield (SF)

• Chesterfield 0-3 Middlesbrough (SF Replay)
