= Geoff Hickson =

English footballer (1939–2026)

Personal information
- Full name: George Geoffrey Hickson
- Date of birth: 26 September 1939
- Place of birth: Crewe, England
- Date of death: c. 2 October 2026 (aged 87)
- Position: Goalkeeper

Youth career
- 1955: Coventry City
- 1956: Liverpool

Senior career*
Years	Team	Apps	(Gls)
1956–1957	Blackburn Rovers	0	(0)
1957	→ Nantwich Town (loan)	5	(0)
1957	Middlewich Athletic	0	(0)
1957–1961	Stoke City	11	(0)
1962–1968	Crewe Alexandra	105	(0)
1968	→ Port Vale (loan)	17	(0)
1968	Southport	3	(0)
1969	→ Shrewsbury Town (loan)	0	(0)
1969	Cape Town City		
Total		141	(0)
- * Club domestic league appearances and goals

George Geoffrey Hickson (26 September 1939 – c. 2 October 2026) was an English football goalkeeper who played in the Football League for Crewe Alexandra, Port Vale, Southport and Stoke City. He won promotion out of the Fourth Division with Crewe in 1962–63. He is one of six post-war players to have played for both the Potteries clubs and Crewe Alexandra.

== Career ==
=== Early career ===
Hickson was born in Crewe and played as an amateur for Coventry City, Liverpool and Blackburn Rovers. He played five Mid-Cheshire League games on loan at Nantwich Town late in the 1956–57 season, having made his debut in a 3–2 home win over Knutsford on 30 March. He signed with Middlewich Athletic in May 1957, though had a trial with Stoke City in August 1957, subsequently joining the club on amateur terms without having featured for Middlewich.

He signed a professional contract at Stoke City in 1959. Long-time regular Bill Robertson sustained an injury in the 1959–60 season, and Hickson was drafted in to provide cover. He played ten Second Division matches in December through to March but was dropped after conceding five away at Liverpool and Tommy Younger took his place for the remainder of the season. He played just once more for Stoke, on the final day of the 1960–61 season in a 3–1 win over Liverpool at the Victoria Ground.

=== Crewe Alexandra ===
Hickson joined his hometown club Crewe Alexandra in 1962, and played 43 of the club's 46 Fourth Division games as promotion was achieved in 1962–63. He then featured 30 times in the 1963–64 season, as Jimmy McGuigan's "Railwaymen" were relegated straight back out of the Third Division. He lost his place at Gresty Road to Willie Maley under new boss Ernie Tagg, and featured just nine times in the 1966–67 campaign and was completely absent in the 1965–66 and 1967–68 campaigns. He was loaned to Fourth Division side Port Vale in August 1968, as manager Gordon Lee needed cover for the injured Stuart Sharratt. Described as a "part-time, pipe-smoking civil servant", he featured for the "Valiants" in the next twenty matches, but was recalled by Crewe in November that year.

=== Later career ===
Hickson joined Southport on trial. He played three Third Division games for the "Sandgrounders". He also had a loan spell with Shrewsbury Town but did not take to the field at Gay Meadow. He later emigrated to South Africa to play for Cape Town City.

== Death ==
On 2 October 2026, it was announced that Hickson had died. He was 87.

== Career statistics ==
Appearances and goals by club, season and competition
Club	Season	League			FA Cup		League Cup		Total	
Club	Season	Division	Apps	Goals	Apps	Goals	Apps	Goals	Apps	Goals
Blackburn Rovers	1956–57	Second Division	0	0	0	0	—		0	0
Nantwich Town (loan)	1956–57	Mid-Cheshire League	5	0	0	0	—		5	0
Stoke City	1959–60	Second Division	10	0	0	0	—		10	0
Stoke City	1960–61	Second Division	1	0	0	0	0	0	1	0
Stoke City	1961–62	Second Division	0	0	0	0	0	0	0	0
Stoke City	Total		11	0	0	0	0	0	11	0
Crewe Alexandra	1962–63	Fourth Division	43	0	3	0	0	0	46	0
Crewe Alexandra	1963–64	Third Division	27	0	2	0	1	0	30	0
Crewe Alexandra	1964–65	Fourth Division	26	0	1	0	0	0	27	0
Crewe Alexandra	1965–66	Fourth Division	0	0	0	0	0	0	0	0
Crewe Alexandra	1966–67	Fourth Division	9	0	0	0	0	0	9	0
Crewe Alexandra	1967–68	Fourth Division	0	0	0	0	0	0	0	0
Crewe Alexandra	Total		105	0	6	0	1	0	112	0
Port Vale (loan)	1968–69	Fourth Division	17	0	0	0	0	0	17	0
Southport	1968–69	Third Division	3	0	0	0	0	0	3	0
Career total			141	0	6	0	1	0	148	0

== Honours ==
Crewe Alexandra

- Football League Fourth Division third-place promotion: 1962–63
