= List of South Shields F.C. seasons =

South Shields Football Club is a professional association football club based in South Shields, Tyne and Wear, England. The team competes in the National League North, the sixth level of the English football league system.

== Early history ==
The club was formed in the same year as the previous club failed, after a second move to Gateshead by the previous club, and the sale of Simonside Hall, given to the club by supporters. The re-formed club under chairman Martin Ford (a director at the club who disagreed with the sale of Simonside Hall and subsequent move to Gateshead International Stadium) was based at the council's Jack Clark Park which was primarily a cricket pitch, and began a 17-year crusade for a home of its own. After two title winning seasons in the Northern Alliance, and an appearance in the quarter-finals of the FA Vase in 1976, Shields joined the Wearside League winning the league at the first attempt in 1977 and completing a league and cup double by winning the Durham Challenge Cup against Consett at Roker Park, the first county cup win for the club since it was reformed.

== Key ==
Key to league record

- Level = Level of the league in the current league system
- Pld = Games played
- W = Games won
- D = Games drawn
- L = Games lost
- GF = Goals for
- GA = Goals against
- GD = Goals difference
- Pts = Points
- Position = Position in the final league table
- Top scorer and number of goals scored shown in bold when he was also top scorer for the division.

Key to cup records

- Res = Final reached round
- Rec = Final club record in the form of wins-draws-losses
- PR = Preliminary round
- QR1 (2, etc.) = Qualifying Cup rounds
- G = Group stage
- R1 (2, etc.) = Proper Cup rounds
- QF = Quarter-finalists
- SF = Semi-finalists
- F = Finalists
- A(QF,SF,F) = Area quarter-, semi-, finalists
- W = Winners

== Seasons ==
Year	League														Cup competitions						Manager
Year	Division	Lvl	Pld	W	D	L	GF	GA	GD	Pts	Position	Leading league scorer		Average attendance	FA Cup		FA Trophy		FA Vase		Manager
Year	Division	Lvl	Pld	W	D	L	GF	GA	GD	Pts	Position	Name	Goals	Average attendance	Res	Rec	Res	Rec	Res	Rec	Manager
Joined the Wearside Football League from the Northern Alliance
1976–77	**Wearside League**		32	23	8	1	109	54	+55	54	1st of 17				—		—		R1	0-0-1	Bobby Elwell
1977–78	**Wearside League**		32	16	8	8	51	39	+12	40	5th of 17				—		—		R1	0-0-1	Tony Cassidy
1978–79	**Wearside League**		32	16	11	5	80	50	+30	43	5th of 17				—		—		—		Tony Cassidy
1979–80	**Wearside League**		38	14	9	15	58	62	-4	37	10th of 20				—		—		—		Bill Robertshaw
1980–81	**Wearside League**		38	17	9	12	97	58	+39	43	8th of 20				—		—		R2	2-0-1	Bill Robertshaw
1981–82	**Wearside League**		38	21	7	10	66	48	+18	49	8th of 20				—		—		R2	2-1-1	Bill Robertshaw
1982–83	**Wearside League**		34	13	8	13	53	58	-5	34	10th of 18				—		—		R2	2-1-1	Bill Robertshaw
1983–84	**Wearside League**		34	17	7	10	61	41	+20	41	6th of 18				—		—		PR	0-0-1	Colin Revel
1984–85	**Wearside League**		38	25	7	6	105	36	+69	57	4th of 20				—		—		PR	0-0-1	Colin Revel
1985–86	**Wearside League**		34	9	8	17	46	60	-14	26	12th of 18				—		—		PR	0-0-1	John Sayer
1986–87	**Wearside League**		38	17	8	13	66	50	+16	59	9th of 20				—		—		PR	0-0-1	John Sayer
1987–88	**Wearside League**		38	17	11	10	78	57	+21	62	5th of 20				—		—		PR	0-0-1	Jim Dixon
Wearside Football League expanded up to two divisions
1988–89	**Wearside League**; **Division One**		32	19	5	8	67	46	+21	62	4th of 17				—		—		R2	3-0-1	Jim Dixon
1989–90	**Wearside League**; **Division One**		28	11	10	7	68	46	+22	43	5th of 15				—		—		PR	1-0-1	Tom Manson
1990–91	**Wearside League**; **Division One**		34	18	5	11	80	51	+29	59	5th of 18				—		—		PR	1-0-1	Tom Manson
1991–92	**Wearside League**; **Division One**		30	21	3	6	90	34	+56	66	3rd of 16				—		—		—		Tom Manson
1992–93	**Wearside League**; **Division One**		28	20	5	3	84	35	+49	65	1st of 15				—		—		R1	2-2-1	Bobby Elwell
1993–94	**Wearside League**; **Division One**		32	18	7	7	79	44	+35	61	4th of 17				PR	0-0-0	—		R2	1-0-1	Bobby Elwell
1994–95	**Wearside League**; **Division One**		34	28	2	4	116	44	+72	86	1st of 18				QR2	2-2-1	—		R4	3-0-1	Peter Feenan
1995–96	**Northern Football League**; **Division Two**	9	36	25	4	7	89	34	+55	79	2nd of 19				PR	0-0-1	—		R1	0-0-1	Peter Feenan
1996–97	**Northern Football League**; **Division One**	8	38	13	11	14	52	63	-11	50	9th of 20				PR	0-0-1	—		R3	3-2-1	Bobby Graham
1997–98	**Northern Football League**; **Division One**	8	38	15	19	4	65	38	+27	61 (Note: Three points deducted)	8th of 20				QR3	3-0-1	—		R1	1-0-1	Bobby Graham
1998–99	**Northern Football League**; **Division One**	8	36	9	16	13	54	66	-12	43	15th of 20				QR1	0-0-1	—		R1	1-0-1	Bobby Graham
1999–2000	**Northern Football League**; **Division One**	8	38	3	7	28	33	95	-62	16	20th of 20				PR	0-0-1	—		QR2	0-0-1	Matt Pearson
2000–01	**Northern Football League**; **Division Two**	9	36	12	9	15	71	81	-10	45	11th of 19				PR	1-0-1	—		R1	1-0-1	John Cullen
2001–02	**Northern Football League**; **Division Two**	9	38	18	8	12	62	41	+21	62	8th of 20				PR	0-0-1	—		QR2	0-0-1	Paul Bennett
2002–03	**Northern Football League**; **Division Two**	9	38	16	11	11	86	70	+16	59	8th of 20				PR	0-0-1	—		QR1	0-0-1	David Clarke
2003–04	**Northern Football League**; **Division Two**	9	38	14	8	16	61	68	-7	50	12th of 20				PR	0-1-1	—		QR2	0-0-1	Tony Gibson
2003–04	**Northern Football League**; **Division Two**	9	Level of the league decreased after the Conference North and South creation.												PR	0-1-1	—		QR2	0-0-1	Tony Gibson
2004–05	**Northern Football League**; **Division Two**	10	38	13	8	17	73	66	+7	44 (Note: Three points deducted)	13th of 20				PR	0-0-1	—		QR2	0-0-1	Tony Gibson
2005–06	**Northern Football League**; **Division Two**	10	38	10	4	24	51	95	-44	28 (Note: Six points deducted)	18th of 20				PR	0-0-1	—		QR2	0-0-1	Colin Potts
2006–07	**Northern Football League**; **Division Two**	10	40	23	7	10	89	58	+31	76	4th of 21				EPR	0-0-1	—		R3	3-0-1	Gary Steadman
2007–08	**Northern Football League**; **Division Two**	10	38	24	5	9	98	52	+36	77	2nd of 20				PR	1-0-1	—		QR1	0-1-1	Gary Steadman
2008–09	**Northern Football League**; **Division One**	9	42	9	10	23	52	79	-27	37	19th of 22				PR	1-0-1	—		QR1	0-0-1	Gary Steadman
2009–10	**Northern Football League**; **Division One**	9	42	19	6	17	83	87	-4	63	11th of 22				EPR	0-0-1	—		R1	1-0-1	Gary Steadman
2010–11	**Northern Football League**; **Division One**	9	42	17	7	18	61	66	-5	58	11th of 22				PR	1-1-1	—		R1	2-0-1	Gary Steadman
2011–12	**Northern Football League**; **Division One**	9	42	15	6	21	81	91	-11	51	13th of 22				PR	1-2-1	—		R1	1-0-1	Jon King
2012–13	**Northern Football League**; **Division One**	9	46	11	5	30	54	117	-63	38	23rd of 24				QR1	2-2-1	—		R1	1-0-1	Jon King
2013–14	**Northern Football League**; **Division Two**	10	42	11	15	16	62	88	-26	48	17th of 22			69	PR	1-2-1	—		R1	1-1-1	Jon King
2014–15	**Northern Football League**; **Division Two**	10	42	16	5	21	78	74	+4	53	15th of 22			70	—		—		QR2	1-0-1	Jon King
2015–16	**Northern Football League**; **Division Two**	10	42	35	2	5	122	31	+91	107	1st of 22			765	—		—		R3	3-1-0	Jon King
2016–17	**Northern Football League**; **Division One**	9	42	34	6	2	127	35	+92	108	1st of 22			1,226	EPR	0-0-1	—		W	10-0-0	Jon King; Lee Picton & Graham Fenton
2017–18	**Northern Premier League**; **Division One North**	8	42	32	7	3	112	37	+75	103	1st of 22	Carl Finnigan	16	1,489	QR4	5-0-1	QR2	2-1-1	—		Lee Picton & Graham Fenton
2018–19	**Northern Premier League**; **Premier Division**	7	40	27	6	7	86	41	+45	87	2nd of 21	Robert Briggs	15	1,546	QR2	1-0-1	QR3	2-0-1	—		Lee Picton & Graham Fenton
2018–19	**Northern Premier League**; **Premier Division**	7	Lost in the **play-off** final												QR2	1-0-1	QR3	2-0-1	—		Lee Picton & Graham Fenton
2019–20	**Northern Premier League**; **Premier Division**	7	33	21	6	6	64	43	+30	69	1st of 22	Jason Gilchrist	15	1,670	QR1	0-1-1	R1	3-2-1	—		Lee Picton & Graham Fenton
2019–20	**Northern Premier League**; **Premier Division**	7	The season was declared null and void due to COVID-19												QR1	0-1-1	R1	3-2-1	—		Lee Picton & Graham Fenton
2020–21	**Northern Premier League**; **Premier Division**	7	9	4	3	2	12	8	+4	15	6th of 22	Jason Gilchrist	6	– (Note: COVID-19 prevented fans from attending games)	R1	2-2-1	R1	1-0-1	—		Graham Fenton
2020–21	**Northern Premier League**; **Premier Division**	7	The season was declared null and void due to COVID-19												R1	2-2-1	R1	1-0-1	—		Graham Fenton
2021–22	**Northern Premier League**; **Premier Division**	7	42	23	9	10	71	40	+31	78	2nd of 22	JJ Hooper	12	2,126	QR2	1–0–1	QR3	0–1–0	—		Graham Fenton; Kevin Phillips
2021–22	**Northern Premier League**; **Premier Division**	7	Lost in the **play-off** semifinal												QR2	1–0–1	QR3	0–1–0	—		Graham Fenton; Kevin Phillips
2022–23	**Northern Premier League**; **Premier Division**	7	42	25	10	7	71	39	+32	85	1st of 22	Darius Osei	12	2,146	R1	4–0–1	R1	1–0–1	—		Kevin Phillips
2023–24	**National League North**	6	46	22	8	16	79	53	+26	74	8th of 24	Paul Blackett	30	2,220	QR3	1–0–1	R2	0–0–1	—		Julio Arca; Elliott Dickman
2024–25	**National League North**	6	46	16	6	24	60	73	-13	54	17th of 24	Paul Blackett	22	1,924	QR2	0–0–1	R2	0–0–1	—		Elliott Dickman

== Notes ==
- South Shields at the Football Club History Database
