= 2009–10 North West Counties Football League =

The 2009–10 North West Counties Football League season (known as the Vodkat League for sponsorship reasons) was the 28th in the history of the North West Counties Football League, a football competition in England.

The league comprised two divisions, the Premier Division and the First Division (at levels 9 and 10 of the English football league system, Steps 5 and 6 of the National League System respectively). Additionally there were two cup competitions: the League Challenge Cup knockout competition (known as the Vodkat League Challenge Cup for sponsorship reasons) open to all the league's clubs; and the First Division Trophy, a knockout trophy competition for First Division clubs only. The league also had a reserves team section.

== Premier Division ==
North West Counties Football League Premier Division
- Season: 2009–10
- Teams: 22
- Champions: Newcastle Town
- Promoted: Newcastle Town
- Relegated: Abbey Hey
- Matches: 462
- Goals: 1,550 (3.35 per match)
- Average attendance: 90

The Premier Division featured 22 clubs, 20 remained from the previous season plus 2 additions (both promoted from the First Division):

- Bootle, promoted as champions
- Padiham, promoted as runners-up

Over the season the champions Newcastle Town with 37 wins from 42 matches and 114 points created new league records for league wins and points (exceeding the 36 wins and 112 points accrued by F.C. United of Manchester in the 2006–07 season) and also a points difference record to the runners-up of 24 points (greater than the 23 of Atherton Laburnum Rovers from the 1992–93 season).

At the end of the season Newcastle Town were promoted to the Northern Premier. League Division One South and two other clubs left the division: bottom placed Abbey Hey were relegated to the First Division; and Nelson resigned having disbanded their team for financial reasons.

=== League table ===
Pos	Team	Pld	W	D	L	GF	GA	GD	Pts	Season End Notes
1	Newcastle Town (P)	42	37	3	2	121	21	+100	114	Promoted to Northern Premier; League Division One South
2	New Mills	42	27	9	6	108	38	+70	90	
3	Bootle	42	26	7	9	92	41	+51	85	
4	Ramsbottom United	42	24	9	9	92	69	+23	81	
5	Congleton Town	42	24	8	10	90	46	+44	80	
6	Maine Road	42	21	7	14	82	59	+23	70	
7	Glossop North End	42	19	12	11	74	49	+25	69	
8	Colne	42	19	10	13	70	65	+5	67	
9	St Helens Town	42	20	6	16	74	75	−1	66	
10	Padiham	42	18	6	18	71	71	0	60	
11	Runcorn Linnets	42	17	6	19	75	78	−3	57	
12	Bacup Borough	42	15	12	15	63	75	−12	57	
13	Squires Gate	42	15	8	19	61	74	−13	53	
14	Silsden	42	13	7	22	53	75	−22	46	
15	Formby	42	14	3	25	57	81	−24	45	
16	Flixton	42	12	8	22	54	85	−31	44	
17	Nelson	42	12	8	22	47	87	−40	44	resigned (disbanded)
18	Alsager Town	42	11	7	24	60	79	−19	40	
19	Winsford United	42	11	7	24	53	79	−26	40	
20	Atherton Laburnum Rovers	42	10	7	25	53	96	−43	37	
21	Ashton Athletic	42	8	8	26	51	101	−50	32	
22	Abbey Hey (R)	42	7	6	29	49	106	−57	27	Relegated to the First Division

Source: "Final Tables, Season 2009/10". nwcfl.com., "North West Counties League 2000-11: 2009–10". nonleaguematters.co.uk.
Rules for classification: 1) points; 2) goal difference; 3) number of goals scored.
(P) Promoted; (R) Relegated

== First Division ==
North West Counties Football League First Division
- Season: 2009–10
- Teams: 17
- Champions: Stone Dominoes
- Promoted: Stone Dominoes; Barnoldswick Town
- Relegated: None
- Matches: 272
- Goals: 910 (3.35 per match)
- Average attendance: 58

The First Division featured 17 clubs, 15 remained from the previous season plus 2 additions:

- Atherton Collieries relegated from the Premier Division
- Barnoldswick Town promoted from the West Lancashire League

During the season in October 2009 Oldham Town changed their name to Oldham Boro

At the end of the season the champions Stone Dominoes and runners-up Barnoldswick Town (who had joined the league this season) were promoted to the Premier Division. No other clubs left the division.

=== League table ===
Pos	Team	Pld	W	D	L	GF	GA	GD	Pts	Season End Notes
1	Stone Dominoes (P)	32	21	6	5	81	37	+44	69	Promoted to Premier Division
2	Barnoldswick Town (P)	32	20	7	5	66	27	+39	67	Promoted to Premier Division
3	Norton United	32	16	6	10	51	41	+10	54	
4	Chadderton	32	14	8	10	54	46	+8	50	
5	A.F.C. Liverpool	32	15	4	13	60	43	+17	49	
6	Atherton Collieries	32	15	4	13	63	66	−3	49	
7	Holker Old Boys	32	13	8	11	50	50	0	47	
8	Leek County School Old Boys	32	13	7	12	50	48	+2	46	
9	Eccleshall	32	13	7	12	43	45	−2	46	
10	Irlam	32	12	7	13	52	45	+7	43	
11	Daisy Hill	32	12	7	13	55	60	−5	43	
12	Wigan Robin Park	32	12	5	15	54	60	−6	41	
13	Ashton Town	32	11	7	14	62	73	−11	40	
14	Cheadle Town	32	9	9	14	46	57	−11	33 (Note: Cheadle Town had 3 points deducted)	
15	A.F.C. Blackpool	32	9	5	18	50	64	−14	32	
16	Oldham Boro	32	7	8	17	37	57	−20	29	
17	Rochdale Town	32	5	5	22	36	91	−55	20	

Source: "Final Tables, Season 2009/10". nwcfl.com., "North West Counties League 2000-11: 2009–10". nonleaguematters.co.uk.
Rules for classification: 1) points; 2) goal difference; 3) number of goals scored.
(P) Promoted

== League Challenge Cup ==
The 2009–10 League Challenge Cup (known as the Vodkat League Challenge Cup for sponsorship reasons) was a knockout competition open to all the league's clubs. The final, played at Curzon Ashton F.C. between two Premier Division clubs, was won by this season's relegated club Abbey Hey who defeated Winsford United 3–0.

Quarter-finals, Semi-finals and Final

Quarter-finals
Abbey Hey (PD)	W (Note: Match awarded to Abbey Hey. New Mills won 3–0 but were disqualified for using an ineligible player)
New Mills (PD)	x
Bootle (PD)	3
Newcastle Town (PD)	2
Winsford United (PD)	5
Glossop North End (PD)	2
St Helens Town (PD) (Note: Played at Wigan Robin Park F.C. following 2 postponements at St Helens)	4
Wigan Robin Park (FD)	2

Semi-finals
Abbey Hey (PD)	1
Bootle (PD)	0
Winsford United (PD)	1
St Helens Town (PD)	0

Final (Note: Played at Curzon Ashton F.C.)
Abbey Hey (PD)	3
Winsford United (PD)	0

Club's division appended to team name: (PD)=Premier Division; (FD)=First Division
source: "League Cup 2009/2010". May 2010. Archived from the original on 13 January 2012.

== First Division Trophy ==
The 2009–10 First Division Trophy was a knockout competition for First Division clubs only. In the final held at Flixton F.C. the winners for the second successive season (and the first two time winners of the trophy) were A.F.C. Liverpool who defeated Cheadle Town 2–1.

Semi-finals and Final

Semi-finals
A.F.C. Liverpool	3
A.F.C. Blackpool	1
Cheadle Town	2
Stone Dominoes	1

Final (Note: Played at Flixton F.C.)
A.F.C. Liverpool	2
Cheadle Town	1

source: "First Division Trophy 2009/2010". April 2010. Archived from the original on 13 January 2012.

== Reserves Section ==
Main honours for the 2009–10 season:

- Reserves Division
  - Winners: Bootle Reserves
  - Runners-up: Glossop North End Reserves
- Reserves Division Cup
  - Winners: Glossop North End Reserves
  - Runners-up: Padiham Reserves
