= 1995–96 Northern Football League =

The 1995–96 Northern Football League season was the 98th in the history of Northern Football League, a football competition in England.

== Division One ==
Northern Football League Division One
- Season: 1995–96
- Champions: Billingham Synthonia
- Relegated: Peterlee Newtown; Eppleton Colliery Welfare; Ferryhill Athletic
- Matches: 380
- Goals: 1,348 (3.55 per match)

Division One featured 17 clubs which competed in the division last season, along with three new clubs, promoted from Division Two:

- Crook Town
- Stockton
- Whickham

=== League table ===
Pos	Team	Pld	W	D	L	GF	GA	GD	Pts	Promotion or relegation
1	Billingham Synthonia	38	24	8	6	78	34	+44	80	
2	Bedlington Terriers	38	22	12	4	90	37	+53	78	
3	Durham City	38	24	6	8	85	35	+50	78	
4	Tow Law Town	38	23	9	6	82	43	+39	78	
5	Whitby Town	38	21	7	10	100	59	+41	70	
6	Guisborough Town	38	20	8	10	80	54	+26	68	
7	Dunston Federation Brewery	38	20	8	10	75	52	+23	68	
8	West Auckland Town	38	19	5	14	66	57	+9	62	
9	Crook Town	38	17	9	12	59	41	+18	60	
10	Consett	38	17	7	14	76	64	+12	58	
11	Stockton	38	16	8	14	88	71	+17	56	
12	Shildon	38	16	3	19	74	74	0	51	
13	Seaham Red Star	38	13	11	14	62	66	−4	50	
14	Murton	38	12	11	15	57	53	+4	47	
15	RTM Newcastle	38	13	7	18	68	58	+10	46	
16	Chester-le-Street Town	38	11	9	18	72	78	−6	42	
17	Whickham	38	11	8	19	43	77	−34	41	
18	Peterlee Newtown	38	5	4	29	40	96	−56	19	Relegated to Division Two
19	Eppleton Colliery Welfare	38	2	3	33	26	153	−127	9	Relegated to Division Two
20	Ferryhill Athletic	38	0	5	33	27	146	−119	5	Relegated to Division Two

Source: fchd
Rules for classification: 1) points; 2) goal difference; 3) number of goals scored.

== Division Two ==
Northern Football League Division Two
- Season: 1995–96
- Champions: Morpeth Town
- Promoted: Morpeth Town; South Shields; Easington Colliery
- Matches: 342
- Goals: 1,256 (3.67 per match)

Division Two featured 16 clubs which competed in the division last season, along with four new clubs.

- Clubs relegated from Division One:
  - Hebburn
  - Northallerton Town
  - Prudhoe Town
- Plus:
  - South Shields, joined from the Wearside Football League

=== League table ===
Pos	Team	Pld	W	D	L	GF	GA	GD	Pts	Promotion or relegation
1	Morpeth Town	36	27	5	4	104	40	+64	86	Promoted to Division One
2	South Shields	36	25	4	7	89	34	+55	79	Promoted to Division One
3	Easington Colliery	36	23	7	6	86	40	+46	76	Promoted to Division One
4	Shotton Comrades	36	22	7	7	72	42	+30	73	
5	Northallerton Town	36	18	9	9	70	45	+25	63	
6	Ashington	36	18	9	9	66	48	+18	63	
7	Billingham Town	36	18	6	12	73	51	+22	60	
8	Evenwood Town	36	16	8	12	70	61	+9	56	
9	Prudhoe Town	36	17	4	15	75	69	+6	55	
10	Brandon United	36	16	6	14	59	55	+4	54	
11	Esh Winning	36	13	7	16	80	75	+5	46	
12	Hebburn	36	13	5	18	50	56	−6	44	
13	Washington	36	14	4	18	71	73	−2	43 (Note: Washington were deducted three points.)	
14	Horden Colliery Welfare	36	13	3	20	64	74	−10	42	
15	Willington	36	11	8	17	53	75	−22	41	
16	Alnwick Town	36	10	6	20	47	65	−18	36	
17	Ryhope Community	36	6	5	25	41	82	−41	23	
18	Norton & Stockton Ancients	36	6	5	25	53	120	−67	17 (Note: Norton & Stockton Ancients were deducted six points.)	
19	Darlington Cleveland Social	36	0	4	32	33	151	−118	4	

Source: fchd
Rules for classification: 1) points; 2) goal difference; 3) number of goals scored.
