= GUAFC =

GUAFC can refer to:

- Garswood United A.F.C.
- Griffith University Australian Football Club

== See also ==
- GUFC (disambiguation)
