= Cheshire League =

Cheshire League can refer to:

- Cheshire County League, a defunct English non-league football competition
- Cheshire Football League, an English non-league football competition
