= Cheshire Football Association =

- Formation: 1878
- Purpose: Football Association
- Headquarters: Hartford House; Hartford Moss Recreation Centre
- Location(s): Northwich Cheshire CW8 4BG
- Chief Executive: Steve Smithies
- Website: CheshireFA.com

The Cheshire Football Association, also simply known as Cheshire FA, is the governing body of football in the county of Cheshire, England. They are responsible for the governance and development of football at all levels in the county.

== About ==
The Cheshire Football Association is the not-for-profit governing body for all football in Cheshire and is responsible for the governance, organisation, education and development of grassroots football.

They have approximately 3,500 teams playing various formats of affiliated football with over 60,000 weekly participants. The game is supported by over 1,000 referees and upwards of 10,000 volunteers running the game.

Cheshire FA works towards a strategic framework that looks to inwardly invest into key aspects of the game. Over £24 million has been invested into facilities supporting the local football infrastructure and over £4 million into revenue projects.

In 2000 the association became incorporated, and seven directors were appointed with responsibility for business and financial matters, leaving the traditionally elected council, through a number of standing committees, to retain full responsibility for all football-related activities.

On 30 October 2003, Cheshire FA Headquarters & Football Development Centre was opened by the chairman of the football association. A year later Cheshire FA celebrated its 125th anniversary and were presented with an address from the FA to record its appreciation of the outstanding services to the game rendered by the officers and members.

Following on from the European Learning Difficulties European Championships in 2008, Cheshire FA was formally recognised by the UEFA grassroots programme for the legacy work that was undertaken for and beyond the championships.

Currently, Cheshire FA employees a professional team of 24 staff.

In May 2018 the association announced plans for a £70m development near Northwich, modelled on St George's Park National Football Centre. The facility would include two FIFA-standard pitches with a 1000-seat stadium, 3G pitches, six grass pitches, full medical facilities and a hotel/spa.

=== District associations ===
Cheshire FA has a sub County structure of nine district football associations who play an integral part in governing and developing Football.

The nine district associations are as follows:

- Altrincham and District Association
- Chester and District Association
- Crewe and District Association
- Macclesfield and District Association
- Mid Cheshire District Association
- Runcorn and District Association
- Stalybridge and Hyde District Association
- Stockport and District Association
- Wirral District Association

== Affiliated Member Clubs ==
Among the notable clubs that are (or have been) affiliated to Cheshire FA are:

- 1874 Northwich
- Alsager Town
- Altrincham
- Barnton
- Cammell Laird
- Cheadle Town
- Chester City (now defunct)
- Chester FC
- Congleton Town
- Crewe Alexandra
- Ellesmere Port Town
- Heswall
- Hyde United
- Knutsford
- Middlewich Town
- Nantwich Town
- New Brighton (now defunct)
- Northwich Victoria
- Runcorn Halton (now defunct)
- Runcorn Linnets
- Runcorn Town
- Sandbach United
- Stalybridge Celtic
- Stockport County
- Stockport Town
- Witton Albion
- Woodley Sports (now defunct)
- Tranmere Rovers
- Vauxhall Motors
- Warrington Town
- Winsford United

The Cheshire FA currently organises nine County Cup competitions. Holders are:

Competition	Holders	Season
Cheshire Senior Cup	Hyde United	2023-24
Cheshire Ladies Cup	Stockport County Ladies	2023-24
Cheshire Amateur Cup	Ashville	2015–16
Cheshire Sunday Cup	Cale Green	2015–16
Cheshire Youth Cup	Altrincham U17s	2015–16
Cheshire Junior Cup	West Kirby & Wasps U15s (Black)	2015–16
Cheshire Minor Cup	Broadheath Central U13s (Avalanche)	2015–16
Cheshire Girls' U13s Minor Cup	Runcorn Linnets U13s (Yellow)	2015–16
Cheshire Girls' U15s Junior Cup	Manor Club Wallasey	2015–16

== List of Cheshire Senior Cup Winners ==
Year	Cheshire Senior Cup Winners
1979–80	Winsford United
1980–81	Hyde United
1981–82	Altrincham
1982–83	Macclesfield Town
1983–84	Northwich Victoria
1984–85	Runcorn
1985–86	Runcorn
1986–87	Runcorn
1987–88	Runcorn
1988–89	Runcorn

Year	Cheshire Senior Cup Winners
1989–90	Hyde United
1990–91	Macclesfield Town
1991–92	Macclesfield Town
1992–93	Winsford United
1993–94	Northwich Victoria
1994–95	Witton Albion
1995–96	Witton Albion
1996–97	Hyde United
1997–98	Macclesfield Town

Year	Cheshire Senior Cup Winners
1998–99	Altrincham
1999–2000	Macclesfield Town
2000–01	Stalybridge Celtic
2001–02	Crewe Alexandra
2002–03	Crewe Alexandra
2003–04	Woodley Sports
2004–05	Altrincham
2005–06	Witton Albion
2006–07	Cammell Laird

Year	Cheshire Senior Cup Winners
2007–08	Nantwich Town
2008–09	Altrincham
2009–10	Northwich Victoria
2010–11	Northwich Victoria
2011–12	Nantwich Town
2012–13	Chester FC
2013–14	Northwich Victoria
2014–15	Macclesfield Town
2015–16	Stockport County

Year	Cheshire Senior Cup Winners
2016–17	Crewe Alexandra
2017–18	Nantwich Town
2018-19	Nantwich Town

== Directors and officials ==
=== Board of directors ===
- D. D. Edmunds (Chairman)
- T. G. Harrop (Vice Chairman)
- P. Cullen
- D. W. Mansfield
- M. J. Pomfret
- P. Ferneyhough
- S. Humphreys
- C. Garlick
- K. Rickett
