= GUFC =

GUFC may refer to the following association football clubs:

- Galway United F.C.
- Garankuwa United F.C.
- Garswood United F.C.
- Gibraltar United F.C.
- Glacis United F.C.
- Glasgow University F.C.
- Gloucester United F.C.
- Gombak United FC
- Gravesend United F.C.
- Gresik United F.C.
- Greystones United F.C.
- Grove United F.C.
- Gunghalin United F.C.

== See also ==
- GUAFC (disambiguation)
