= 2008–09 North West Counties Football League =

The 2008–09 North West Counties Football League season (known as the Vodkat League for sponsorship reasons) was the 27th in the history of the North West Counties Football League, a football competition in England.

The league comprised two divisions (at levels 9 and 10 of the English football league system, Steps 5 and 6 of the National League System) known from this season as the Premier and the First Divisions (having previously been designated Division One and Division Two respectively). Additionally there were two cup competitions: the League Challenge Cup knockout competition (known as the Vodkat League Challenge Cup for sponsorship reasons) open to all the league's clubs; and the First Division Trophy (previously designated the Second Division Trophy), a knockout trophy competition for First Division clubs only. The league also had a reserves team section.

== Premier Division ==
North West Counties Football League Premier Division
- Season: 2008–09
- Teams: 22
- Champions: AFC Fylde
- Promoted: AFC Fylde
- Relegated: Atherton Collieries
- Matches: 462
- Goals: 1,510 (3.27 per match)
- Average attendance: 96

The Premier Division was expanded to 22 clubs (from 20 last season), 18 remained from the previous season plus 4 additions:

- AFC Fylde (renamed from Kirkham & Wesham F.C.), promoted as runners-up of Division Two
- Alsager Town, relegated from the Northern Premier League Division One South
- Ashton Athletic, promoted as third in Division Two
- New Mills, promoted as champions of Division Two

At the end of the season the champions AFC Fylde and runners-up New Mills had equal points with the former clinching the title on goal difference – there had not been a tie on points at the top of the table since 1987–88 (between Colne Dynamoes and Rossendale United). AFC Fylde, who had been promoted to this division this season, earned a second successive promotion to the Northern Premier League Division One North. The bottom placed club Atherton Collieries were relegated to the First Division.

=== League table ===
Pos	Team	Pld	W	D	L	GF	GA	GD	Pts	Season End Notes
1	AFC Fylde (P)	42	33	5	4	122	35	+87	104	Promoted to Northern Premier; League Division One North
2	New Mills	42	34	2	6	92	33	+59	104	
3	Newcastle Town	42	26	9	7	91	33	+58	87	
4	Congleton Town	42	26	8	8	85	44	+41	86	
5	Glossop North End	42	25	7	10	83	49	+34	82	
6	Ashton Athletic	42	18	7	17	67	68	−1	61	
7	Alsager Town	42	18	5	19	66	72	−6	59	
8	Bacup Borough	42	16	10	16	71	71	0	58	
9	Silsden	42	16	10	16	62	67	−5	58	
10	Squires Gate	42	14	15	13	56	56	0	57	
11	Runcorn Linnets	42	16	7	19	64	84	−20	55	
12	Atherton Laburnum Rovers	42	12	15	15	70	77	−7	51	
13	Maine Road	42	14	9	19	60	74	−14	51	
14	Ramsbottom United	42	13	12	17	56	72	−16	50 (Note: Ramsbottom United had 3 points deducted.)	
15	Formby	42	15	3	24	57	67	−10	48	
16	St Helens Town	42	14	4	24	64	97	−33	46	
17	Nelson	42	11	12	19	68	86	−18	45	
18	Colne	42	11	10	21	64	75	−11	43	
19	Flixton	42	9	14	19	58	86	−28	41	
20	Winsford United	42	10	9	23	52	82	−30	39	
21	Abbey Hey	42	11	5	26	60	89	−29	38	
22	Atherton Collieries (R)	42	7	8	27	42	93	−51	29	Relegated to the First Division

Source: "Final Tables, Season 2008/09". nwcfl.com., "North West Counties League 2000-11: 2008–09". nonleaguematters.co.uk.
Rules for classification: 1) points; 2) goal difference; 3) number of goals scored.
(P) Promoted; (R) Relegated

== First Division ==
North West Counties Football League First Division
- Season: 2008–09
- Teams: 18
- Champions: Bootle
- Promoted: Bootle; Padiham
- Relegated: None
- Matches: 306
- Goals: 1,055 (3.45 per match)
- Average attendance: 77

The First Division featured 18 clubs, 15 remaining from the previous season plus 3 additions:

- A.F.C. Liverpool, a newly formed club
- Irlam, from 8th in the Manchester League
- Wigan Robin Park, promoted as champions of the Manchester League

Two member clubs changed their names this season:

- Blackpool Mechanics to AFC Blackpool
- Castleton Gabriels to Rochdale Town

At the end of the season the champions Bootle and runners-up Padiham were promoted to the Premier Division. League founder member club Darwen left the league as they folded after the end of the season

=== League table ===
Pos	Team	Pld	W	D	L	GF	GA	GD	Pts	Season End Notes
1	Bootle (P)	34	25	5	4	78	27	+51	80	Promoted to Premier Division
2	Padiham (P)	34	22	7	5	93	41	+52	73	Promoted to Premier Division
3	Stone Dominoes	34	23	2	9	85	51	+34	71	
4	A.F.C. Liverpool	34	22	3	9	82	39	+43	69	
5	Wigan Robin Park	34	18	5	11	61	49	+12	59	
6	Oldham Town	34	16	5	13	60	54	+6	53	
7	Cheadle Town	34	16	4	14	54	44	+10	52	
8	Irlam	34	13	13	8	51	43	+8	52	
9	Holker Old Boys	34	14	8	12	59	61	−2	50	
10	Chadderton	34	14	6	14	60	54	+6	48	
11	Eccleshall	34	14	5	15	44	44	0	47	
12	Norton United	34	12	6	16	63	60	+3	42	
13	Darwen	34	11	7	16	51	74	−23	40	Club folded after season
14	Leek County School Old Boys	34	7	10	17	51	72	−21	31	
15	A.F.C. Blackpool	34	7	8	19	34	59	−25	29	
16	Rochdale Town	34	6	6	22	55	91	−36	24	
17	Daisy Hill	34	6	4	24	39	101	−62	22	
18	Ashton Town	34	4	8	22	35	91	−56	20	

Source: "Final Tables, Season 2008/09". nwcfl.com., "North West Counties League 2000-11: 2008–09". nonleaguematters.co.uk.
Rules for classification: 1) points; 2) goal difference; 3) number of goals scored.
(P) Promoted

== League Challenge Cup ==
The 2008–09 League Challenge Cup (known as the Vodkat League Challenge Cup for sponsorship reasons) was a knockout competition open to all the league's clubs. The final, played at Curzon Ashton F.C. between two Premier Division clubs, was won by New Mills who defeated Runcorn Linnets 2–0.

Semi-finals and Final

(The semi-finals were decided on aggregate score from two legs played)

Semi-finals
Padiham (FD)	0	0	0
New Mills (PD)	5	1	6
Runcorn Linnets (PD)	1	2	3
Silsden (PD)	2	0	2

Final (Note: Played at Curzon Ashton F.C.)
New Mills (PD)	2
Runcorn Linnets (PD)	0

Club's division appended to team name: (PD)=Premier Division; (FD)=First Division
sources:

- Semi-finals: "Padiham out to silence AFC Liverpool". Lancashire Telegraph. 14 April 2009.; David Bassett (13 April 2009). "Runcorn Linnets reach Vodkat cup final". The Free Library: Daily Post (Liverpool).;
- Final: "May News: Tuesday 12 May 2009: New Mills win the Vodkat League Challenge Cup". 12 May 2009. Archived from the original on 28 June 2009.

== First Division Trophy ==
The 2008–09 First Division Trophy (previously named the Second Division Trophy) was a knockout competition for First Division clubs only. In the final held at Ashton Athletic F.C. newly formed club and league newcomers A.F.C. Liverpool defeated Padiham 1–0.

Semi-finals and Final

(The semi-finals were decided on aggregate score from two legs played)

Semi-finals
A.F.C. Liverpool	2	2	4
Norton United	1	0	1
Oldham Town	1	1	2
Padiham	1	3	4

Final (Note: Played at Ashton Athletic F.C.)
A.F.C. Liverpool	1
Padiham	0

sources:

- Semi-finals: AFC Liverpool, "Norton United v AFC Liverpool," posted on April 6, 2009, YouTube video, 9:50, https://www.youtube.com/watch?v=fq7tI-SRew8; "Padiham 3 Oldham Town 1". Lancashire Telegraph. 16 March 2009.
- Final: "Police called to Padiham v AFC Liverpool final". Lancashire Telegraph. 20 April 2009.

== Reserves Section ==
Main honours for the 2008–09 season:

- Reserves Division
  - Winners: Glossop North End Reserves
  - Runners-up: Bootle Reserves
- Reserves Division Cup
  - Winners: Glossop North End Reserves
  - Runners-up: Ashton Athletic Reserves
