= 1997–98 Northern Premier League =

The 1997–98 Northern Premier League season was the 30th in the history of the Northern Premier League, a football competition in England. Teams were divided into two divisions; the Premier and the First. It was known as the Unibond League for sponsorship reasons.

== Premier Division ==
Northern Premier League Premier Division
- Season: 1997–98
- Champions: Barrow
- Promoted: Barrow
- Relegated: Alfreton Town; Radcliffe Borough
- Matches: 462
- Goals: 1,270 (2.75 per match)

The Premier League featured three new teams:

- Altrincham relegated from the Football Conference
- Leigh RMI promoted as runners up from Division One
- Radcliffe Borough promoted as champions from Division One

=== League table ===
Pos	Team	Pld	W	D	L	GF	GA	GD	Pts	Promotion or relegation
1	Barrow (C, P)	42	25	8	9	61	29	+32	83	Promotion to Football Conference
2	Boston United	42	22	12	8	55	40	+15	78	Transferred to the Southern League Premier Division
3	Leigh RMI	42	21	13	8	63	41	+22	76	
4	Runcorn	42	22	9	11	80	50	+30	75	
5	Gainsborough Trinity	42	22	9	11	60	39	+21	75	
6	Emley	42	22	8	12	81	61	+20	74	
7	Winsford United	42	19	12	11	54	43	+11	69	
8	Altrincham	42	18	11	13	76	44	+32	65	
9	Guiseley	42	16	16	10	61	53	+8	64	
10	Bishop Auckland	42	17	12	13	78	60	+18	63	
11	Marine	42	15	11	16	56	59	−3	56	
12	Hyde United	42	13	16	13	60	55	+5	55	
13	Colwyn Bay	42	15	9	18	53	57	−4	54	
14	Spennymoor United	42	14	11	17	58	72	−14	52 (Note: Spennymoor United were docked 1 point.)	
15	Chorley	42	14	7	21	51	70	−19	49	
16	Frickley Athletic	42	12	12	18	45	62	−17	48	
17	Lancaster City	42	13	8	21	55	74	−19	47	
18	Blyth Spartans	42	12	13	17	52	63	−11	39 (Note: Blyth Spartans were docked 10 points.)	
19	Bamber Bridge	42	9	12	21	51	74	−23	39	
20	Accrington Stanley	42	8	14	20	49	68	−19	38	
21	Radcliffe Borough (R)	42	6	12	24	39	70	−31	30	Relegation to NPL Division One
22	Alfreton Town (R)	42	3	13	26	32	86	−54	22	Relegation to NPL Division One

Updated to match(es) played on 2 May 1998. Source: .
Rules for classification: 1) points; 2) goal difference; 3) number of goals scored.
(C) Champions; (P) Promoted; (R) Relegated

=== Results ===
Home \ Away	ACC	ALF	ALT	BAM	BRW	BIS	BLY	BOS	CHO	COL	EML	FRK	GAI	GUI	HYD	LNC	LEI	MAR	RAD	RUN	SPU	WNS
Accrington Stanley		1–1	1–1	1–1	0–1	1–1	2–0	1–1	0–3	1–2	4–2	3–0	0–2	2–3	1–1	1–1	1–3	1–1	2–2	0–3	3–0	2–1
Alfreton Town	0–1		0–3	1–2	0–3	2–6	0–3	1–2	1–1	1–1	1–1	2–1	2–3	1–1	0–1	1–1	3–2	0–0	0–2	1–3	2–3	0–1
Altrincham	1–0	5–0		5–0	2–2	1–1	3–0	1–2	3–0	3–0	7–1	2–1	0–0	2–0	1–3	1–0	2–2	3–1	3–0	2–1	4–0	0–1
Bamber Bridge	2–1	4–1	0–3		2–2	2–1	1–4	2–2	4–0	0–2	2–3	3–0	0–2	1–2	1–1	0–1	1–1	1–2	1–0	1–3	2–2	2–3
Barrow	2–0	2–0	0–0	2–0		3–1	3–1	1–0	1–0	1–1	1–0	2–1	2–0	0–1	2–2	1–0	0–1	0–1	3–0	1–0	1–2	1–2
Bishop Auckland	2–2	1–1	5–2	1–1	0–2		1–1	0–2	5–2	0–2	4–3	4–1	1–3	1–1	2–1	3–1	3–2	2–4	3–0	1–2	1–1	6–0
Blyth Spartans	2–2	4–2	3–3	1–1	2–1	1–4		0–1	2–1	3–1	0–2	2–3	0–0	1–1	1–1	0–1	0–1	1–0	1–0	0–4	2–3	0–1
Boston United	1–3	2–0	1–0	1–1	0–2	1–0	2–2		1–1	1–0	3–2	3–0	1–0	2–1	1–1	2–0	1–0	1–1	2–2	0–3	1–3	2–1
Chorley	1–1	2–0	1–0	2–1	0–2	1–0	1–3	0–2		2–0	1–2	0–0	1–1	1–0	1–5	2–3	0–1	0–3	1–1	4–2	4–1	2–0
Colwyn Bay	2–1	3–0	0–0	3–1	1–1	0–1	2–0	0–3	3–3		1–3	1–1	1–1	0–1	3–1	5–2	2–3	4–1	2–1	2–1	2–0	0–3
Emley	5–3	2–0	2–1	0–0	3–0	1–2	1–1	0–0	3–1	1–0		1–0	1–0	3–3	2–1	5–3	2–2	2–0	2–0	6–2	3–0	0–2
Frickley Athletic	2–1	2–1	2–1	1–0	0–1	2–3	0–0	1–0	2–0	1–3	2–1		1–1	0–1	2–1	2–1	0–0	1–1	1–0	1–3	2–3	3–0
Gainsborough Trinity	0–0	4–0	2–1	3–2	0–3	1–0	0–0	0–1	2–1	1–0	2–1	3–1		0–1	3–1	2–1	3–0	2–0	3–0	1–0	0–1	0–2
Guiseley	1–0	1–2	2–2	1–1	1–1	3–3	1–3	1–1	2–1	3–1	0–2	4–0	1–3		1–1	2–1	2–1	2–2	4–1	2–2	1–1	0–2
Hyde United	1–1	4–1	0–1	1–1	0–3	1–2	1–0	0–2	0–2	2–0	1–0	1–1	4–1	1–1		4–1	3–3	1–1	0–1	0–2	3–2	4–3
Lancaster City	3–2	1–1	2–2	1–0	0–2	1–0	3–1	3–1	4–1	0–1	2–2	2–2	0–1	3–2	0–1		0–1	3–2	0–1	3–0	3–2	1–1
Leigh RMI	1–0	1–0	2–2	4–0	0–1	1–3	1–1	0–1	2–0	3–0	2–1	1–1	1–0	0–0	2–1	2–0		1–0	0–0	2–2	4–2	2–0
Marine	3–1	2–0	1–0	3–1	1–0	0–0	1–2	1–2	1–2	1–0	3–5	1–1	2–2	0–1	0–2	2–0	1–1		1–2	3–2	0–4	0–0
Radcliffe Borough	1–2	1–1	0–1	3–0	1–2	1–2	1–2	1–1	1–2	1–1	1–2	1–1	1–3	0–2	0–0	6–2	0–1	0–3		0–0	0–2	0–2
Runcorn	3–0	3–1	1–0	4–2	0–1	2–1	1–1	3–0	2–3	0–0	1–0	2–1	2–0	1–1	0–1	3–0	2–2	3–0	6–3		2–0	2–2
Spennymoor United	2–0	1–1	2–1	0–3	3–2	1–1	2–1	1–2	2–0	2–1	2–2	0–0	1–4	1–2	2–2	1–1	0–3	1–2	1–1	0–1		1–1
Winsford United	3–0	0–0	2–1	0–1	0–0	0–0	3–0	0–0	1–0	2–0	0–1	2–1	1–1	2–1	1–1	3–0	0–1	2–4	2–2	1–1	1–0	

Updated to match(es) played on 2 May 1998. Source: Northern Premier Division results grid
Legend: Blue = home team win; Yellow = draw; Red = away team win.

== Division One ==
Northern Premier League Division One
- Season: 1997–98
- Champions: Whitby Town
- Promoted: Whitby Town; Worksop Town
- Relegated: Buxton; Workington
- Matches: 462
- Goals: 1,433 (3.1 per match)

Division One featured five new teams:

- Buxton relegated from the NPL Premier Division
- Belper Town promoted as runners-up from the NCEFL Premier Division
- Trafford promoted as champions from the NWCFL Division One
- Whitby Town promoted as champions from the Northern League Division One
- Witton Albion relegated from the NPL Premier Division

=== League table ===
Pos	Team	Pld	W	D	L	GF	GA	GD	Pts	Promotion or relegation
1	Whitby Town (C, P)	42	30	8	4	99	48	+51	98	Promotion to Premier Division
2	Worksop Town (P)	42	28	7	7	93	44	+49	91	Promotion to Premier Division
3	Ashton United	42	26	9	7	93	43	+50	87	
4	Droylsden	42	24	8	10	70	49	+21	80	
5	Lincoln United	42	20	11	11	76	62	+14	71	
6	Farsley Celtic	42	20	10	12	72	66	+6	70	
7	Witton Albion	42	19	9	14	77	55	+22	66	
8	Eastwood Town	42	18	12	12	68	51	+17	66	
9	Bradford Park Avenue	42	18	11	13	62	46	+16	65	
10	Belper Town	42	18	7	17	68	66	+2	61	
11	Stocksbridge Park Steels	42	17	9	16	68	63	+5	60	
12	Trafford	42	16	6	20	59	61	−2	54	
13	Whitley Bay	42	14	12	16	60	63	−3	54	
14	Matlock Town	42	14	11	17	68	54	+14	53	
15	Gretna	42	13	9	20	58	64	−6	48	
16	Netherfield (Note: From the next season Netherfield were renamed as Netherfield Kendal.)	42	12	11	19	55	75	−20	47	
17	Flixton	42	10	12	20	45	73	−28	42	
18	Congleton Town	42	11	8	23	65	101	−36	41	
19	Harrogate Town	42	8	14	20	57	80	−23	38	
20	Great Harwood Town	42	8	12	22	41	88	−47	36	
21	Workington (R)	42	8	7	27	38	84	−46	31	Relegation to NWCFL Division One
22	Buxton (R)	42	7	3	32	41	87	−46	24	Relegation to NCEFL Premier Division

Updated to match(es) played on 22 February 2011. Source:
Rules for classification: 1) points; 2) goal difference; 3) number of goals scored.
(C) Champions; (P) Promoted; (R) Relegated

=== Results ===
Home \ Away	ASH	BLP	BPA	BUX	CNG	DRO	EAS	FAR	FLX	GHT	GRT	HAR	KEN	LIN	MAT	STO	TRA	WTB	WHI	WTN	WRK	WKS
Ashton United		3–4	0–1	1–0	3–2	4–2	1–0	3–1	2–1	3–0	1–1	3–0	4–1	2–0	5–1	3–3	3–1	2–0	1–4	3–1	1–0	2–1
Belper Town	0–7		0–1	2–1	4–0	0–3	1–3	2–3	4–0	1–2	4–3	2–1	1–0	1–3	1–1	2–1	3–1	0–1	1–1	3–2	5–0	0–4
Bradford Park Avenue	0–0	0–0		4–1	1–0	1–0	0–1	5–2	1–0	1–2	4–0	3–1	3–1	1–1	1–2	2–3	0–1	1–1	3–0	1–2	3–3	2–3
Buxton	1–4	0–2	0–1		4–1	0–1	2–0	1–3	2–2	1–2	1–3	2–0	1–0	1–3	1–3	1–1	0–2	1–2	2–3	1–3	2–3	0–1
Congleton Town	0–3	0–4	2–1	3–1		2–2	1–0	1–3	1–3	1–1	1–0	2–4	2–0	3–3	3–1	2–2	1–4	1–2	2–1	3–3	1–3	0–1
Droylsden	2–1	2–0	2–2	1–0	3–1		0–2	3–0	1–2	2–0	4–1	2–0	0–0	2–3	2–1	2–1	3–1	2–3	1–0	0–4	3–0	1–0
Eastwood Town	1–0	0–1	1–1	2–0	5–0	2–2		3–3	1–1	1–1	3–1	1–0	4–4	0–3	0–0	3–1	2–1	0–0	2–3	1–1	2–0	2–2
Farsley Celtic	2–1	5–2	1–1	2–1	1–1	0–1	2–2		1–0	6–1	3–2	3–3	1–0	2–1	1–1	0–2	5–2	1–2	2–0	0–2	2–1	1–1
Flixton	2–2	1–1	1–3	1–2	0–2	0–1	1–1	1–0		1–0	2–0	0–3	0–0	0–0	1–0	0–4	0–1	1–4	0–1	3–1	6–0	1–1
Great Harwood Town	0–1	3–1	0–2	0–0	2–5	3–3	1–5	1–1	1–1		0–1	1–1	0–0	1–2	3–1	2–2	2–2	0–7	1–1	1–2	0–3	2–3
Gretna	1–1	4–3	1–0	4–0	4–0	3–2	0–2	2–3	1–1	1–2		2–2	0–0	2–1	0–0	2–1	0–1	1–2	0–1	1–1	1–0	2–3
Harrogate Town	1–1	2–0	2–4	2–0	0–3	0–0	0–2	0–1	1–3	1–2	1–1		2–4	2–3	2–2	2–1	4–1	1–1	2–2	0–0	1–1	0–2
Kendal Town	1–3	0–2	1–1	2–1	3–2	0–1	1–3	1–2	5–1	4–0	0–3	1–4		0–3	1–1	0–3	2–1	0–1	4–3	3–1	1–0	2–6
Lincoln United	0–2	1–0	0–0	0–1	3–3	1–2	3–0	2–0	4–1	1–1	2–1	2–1	2–2		4–3	3–0	1–2	2–5	3–0	1–0	1–1	1–0
Matlock Town	1–4	0–3	2–0	3–0	3–0	2–3	1–0	4–0	1–1	1–2	1–1	6–0	2–3	2–3		1–0	2–1	3–3	1–1	4–1	3–0	1–3
Stocksbridge Park Steels	1–4	2–0	0–1	2–1	2–1	1–2	0–3	2–2	1–1	4–1	3–0	4–2	0–1	5–1	2–2		2–1	1–4	2–2	3–0	0–0	1–0
Trafford	2–1	1–1	1–1	4–0	1–3	2–0	1–0	0–1	3–1	1–0	1–0	2–4	4–1	1–1	0–1	1–2		1–3	0–1	0–1	2–1	1–2
Whitby Town	1–1	2–2	5–2	4–3	2–1	1–0	2–0	2–1	6–1	3–0	2–0	1–0	1–1	3–5	1–0	3–0	2–1		3–2	4–1	2–3	2–3
Whitley Bay	1–1	0–2	1–0	3–1	4–4	1–2	0–2	1–2	1–2	2–0	2–0	1–1	2–2	2–2	1–0	5–0	0–0	1–3		0–3	3–0	1–3
Witton Albion	1–1	2–0	1–2	4–0	5–3	2–2	5–1	1–1	4–1	5–0	0–2	4–0	0–2	3–0	0–1	1–0	2–0	1–1	0–0		2–1	1–2
Workington	0–3	0–2	0–1	0–2	4–0	0–1	1–4	1–2	2–0	1–0	0–4	1–1	0–0	1–1	4–2	0–1	1–5	0–1	1–2	1–4		0–4
Worksop Town	1–2	0–0	1–0	3–2	5–1	2–2	3–1	2–0	3–0	3–0	3–2	4–1	4–1	3–0	3–1	1–2	1–1	1–3	2–0	2–0	3–0	

Updated to match(es) played on 2 May 1998. Source: Northern Premier League First Division results grid
Legend: Blue = home team win; Yellow = draw; Red = away team win.

== Promotion and relegation ==
In the thirtieth season of the Northern Premier League Barrow (as champions) were automatically promoted to the Football Conference. Radcliffe Borough and Alfreton Town were relegated to the First Division; these two clubs were replaced by relegated Conference sides Gateshead and Stalybridge Celtic, First Division winners Whitby Town and second placed Worksop Town. In the First Division Workington and Buxton left the League at the end of the season and were replaced by newly admitted Hucknall Town and Burscough.

== Cup results ==
Challenge Cup: Teams from both leagues.

- Altrincham bt. Gainsborough Trinity

President's Cup: 'Plate' competition for losing teams in the NPL Cup.

- Runcorn bt. Guiseley

Peter Swales Shield: Between Champions of NPL Premier Division and Winners of the NPL Cup.

- Altrincham bt. Barrow
