= SDFC =

SDFC may refer to:

- San Diego FC, American professional soccer club
- Salthill Devon F.C., Irish association football club
- Shepshed Dynamo F.C., English football club
- Sime Darby F.C., Malaysian football club
- Stone Dominoes F.C., English football club
- Suzhou Dongwu F.C., Chinese football club
- Swan Districts Football Club, Australian rules football club
