= Charlie Woollett =

English footballer

Personal information
- Full name: Charles Woollett
- Date of birth: 25 November 1920
- Place of birth: Murton, England
- Date of death: 16 July 2011 (aged 90)
- Place of death: Peterlee, England
- Position: Left winger

Senior career*
Years	Team	Apps	(Gls)
- Eppleton Colliery Welfare
1942–1946	Newcastle United	75	(13)
- → Middlesbrough (war guest)
1945	→ Hartlepools United (war guest)	1	(1)
1946–1949	Bradford City	43	(5)
1949	Murton Colliery Welfare		
1949–1950	York City	4	(0)
- Blyth Spartans
Total		123	(19)
- * Club domestic league appearances and goals

Charles Woollett (25 November 1920 – 16 July 2011) was an English professional footballer who played as a left winger.

== Career ==
Born in Murton, Woollett played for Eppleton Colliery Welfare, Newcastle United, Bradford City, Murton Colliery Welfare, York City and Blyth Spartans.

While at Newcastle he was a guest for Middlesbrough and Hartlepools United during World War II.

He joined Bradford City in August 1946, leaving the club in February 1949. For Bradford he made 43 appearances in the Football League, and one in the FA Cup.

== Sources ==
- Frost, Terry (1988). Bradford City A Complete Record 1903-1988. Breedon Books Sport. ISBN 0-907969-38-0.
