= 1996–97 Northern Premier League =

The 1996–97 Northern Premier League season was the 29th in the history of the Northern Premier League, a football competition in England. Teams were divided into two divisions; the Premier and the First. It was known as the Unibond League for sponsorship reasons.

== Premier Division ==
Northern Premier League Premier Division
- Season: 1996–97
- Champions: Leek Town
- Promoted: Leek Town
- Relegated: Buxton; Witton Albion
- Matches: 506
- Goals: 1,458 (2.88 per match)

The Premier League featured three new teams:

- Alfreton Town promoted as runners-up from Division One
- Lancaster City promoted as champions from Division One
- Runcorn relegated from the Football Conference

=== League table ===
Pos	Team	Pld	W	D	L	GF	GA	GD	Pts	Promotion or relegation
1	Leek Town (C, P)	44	28	9	7	71	35	+36	93	Promotion to Football Conference
2	Bishop Auckland	44	23	14	7	88	43	+45	83	
3	Hyde United	44	22	16	6	93	46	+47	82	
4	Emley	44	23	12	9	89	54	+35	81	
5	Barrow	44	23	11	10	71	45	+26	80	
6	Boston United	44	22	13	9	74	47	+27	79	
7	Blyth Spartans	44	22	11	11	74	49	+25	77	
8	Marine	44	20	15	9	53	37	+16	75	
9	Guiseley	44	20	11	13	63	54	+9	71	
10	Gainsborough Trinity	44	18	12	14	65	46	+19	66	
11	Accrington Stanley	44	18	12	14	77	70	+7	66	
12	Runcorn	44	15	15	14	63	62	+1	60	
13	Chorley	44	16	9	19	69	66	+3	57	
14	Winsford United	44	13	14	17	50	56	−6	53	
15	Knowsley United	44	12	14	18	58	79	−21	50	Club folded at the end of the season
16	Colwyn Bay	44	11	13	20	60	76	−16	46	
17	Lancaster City	44	12	9	23	48	75	−27	45	
18	Frickley Athletic	44	12	8	24	62	91	−29	44	
19	Spennymoor United	44	10	10	24	52	68	−16	40	
20	Bamber Bridge	44	11	7	26	59	99	−40	40	
21	Alfreton Town	44	8	13	23	45	83	−38	37	
22	Witton Albion (R)	44	5	14	25	41	91	−50	29	Relegation to NPL Division One
23	Buxton (R)	44	5	12	27	33	86	−53	27	Relegation to NPL Division One

Updated to match(es) played on 7 November 2015. Source: Northern Premier Division.
Rules for classification: 1) points; 2) goal difference; 3) number of goals scored.
(C) Champions; (P) Promoted; (R) Relegated

=== Results ===
Home \ Away	ACC	ALF	BAM	BRW	BIS	BLY	BOS	BUX	CHO	COL	EML	FRK	GAI	GUI	HYD	KNO	LNC	LEE	MAR	RUN	SPU	WNS	WTN
Accrington Stanley		4–2	4–1	1–2	1–4	2–3	3–1	5–3	0–3	3–1	1–1	4–0	0–4	1–2	3–2	1–1	2–1	1–2	1–0	2–2	2–0	0–0	4–1
Alfreton Town	1–3		2–1	2–3	1–1	1–2	1–2	1–2	0–3	2–1	0–0	1–0	0–1	4–5	0–3	2–0	1–0	1–1	0–1	1–1	2–1	1–1	2–1
Bamber Bridge	1–1	2–2		1–3	1–2	0–1	0–2	2–2	0–2	2–3	0–3	5–1	1–1	6–4	1–4	1–2	0–2	0–4	1–0	0–5	1–3	1–2	4–2
Barrow	4–3	3–0	1–1		0–1	2–2	0–1	0–0	3–0	1–0	3–0	2–0	2–2	1–1	1–1	1–1	3–0	3–0	0–1	1–1	1–0	2–1	3–1
Bishop Auckland	1–1	2–2	2–0	0–1		1–3	1–0	5–0	1–3	3–1	0–1	2–2	3–3	1–0	3–0	4–1	4–2	1–1	2–2	2–0	4–1	2–0	5–0
Blyth Spartans	1–1	2–1	2–1	1–0	0–0		1–2	5–0	1–3	0–0	1–1	6–3	1–1	1–1	2–1	6–0	3–1	0–1	1–1	3–2	2–0	1–2	0–0
Boston United	3–1	1–1	1–1	3–5	1–1	2–1		3–0	3–0	3–2	4–1	2–3	1–1	1–1	0–0	1–0	4–2	0–2	2–0	2–2	2–0	2–0	2–1
Buxton	1–3	0–1	0–1	0–1	1–1	1–2	0–2		0–1	2–2	0–3	1–3	2–1	0–1	0–3	0–0	1–0	0–2	0–2	0–2	0–2	1–2	1–1
Chorley	1–1	2–1	1–3	1–3	1–1	1–3	3–4	2–2		4–0	1–2	0–1	3–4	1–0	3–3	2–2	0–2	0–0	2–1	4–0	1–0	0–1	6–1
Colwyn Bay	0–2	1–1	5–2	1–2	1–2	3–0	1–5	3–4	1–1		3–2	5–0	0–2	1–1	1–3	5–0	1–1	3–1	0–0	3–3	1–1	1–2	0–0
Emley	3–1	4–0	1–2	3–0	2–0	3–2	1–1	3–0	1–0	0–1		3–3	3–3	4–0	2–4	2–4	2–2	2–3	5–1	2–1	3–0	1–1	4–1
Frickley Athletic	0–1	7–2	1–0	0–2	0–4	2–2	2–2	3–1	2–1	3–4	1–2		2–2	0–1	0–3	0–2	3–1	2–3	0–1	1–1	5–2	3–2	1–2
Gainsborough Trinity	2–2	3–0	0–2	3–0	0–1	0–1	1–1	1–1	3–0	2–0	0–3	2–0		1–0	0–1	2–0	1–1	0–1	0–1	4–1	1–0	2–0	3–0
Guiseley	1–0	1–1	5–0	3–1	0–0	2–1	1–0	2–0	1–4	0–1	2–0	1–0	1–0		2–3	1–0	1–1	2–0	0–1	0–1	2–1	1–1	3–0
Hyde United	7–2	5–0	2–2	1–0	1–1	0–2	2–2	2–0	3–2	1–1	1–2	5–1	2–1	2–2		4–0	0–0	3–1	1–1	2–0	4–0	0–0	1–0
Knowsley United	1–1	1–1	5–0	0–3	0–5	0–1	0–0	4–1	4–1	3–0	0–1	0–0	0–1	2–2	3–3		3–1	3–2	3–1	1–1	2–2	0–3	2–1
Lancaster City	1–2	1–0	2–3	1–0	2–1	1–0	0–1	1–0	4–1	1–1	1–3	1–3	0–2	1–2	0–4	2–2		0–3	0–2	0–2	1–0	1–1	2–1
Leek Town	2–1	4–0	4–1	2–1	1–0	4–0	1–0	1–1	1–0	1–0	0–0	3–0	1–0	1–3	0–0	2–0	2–1		0–1	1–1	1–1	3–1	2–1
Marine	2–1	1–1	2–0	1–1	2–3	0–3	1–0	3–0	1–0	0–0	0–0	3–1	2–0	1–2	1–1	2–2	5–1	0–0		1–0	1–0	3–0	0–0
Runcorn	1–3	1–0	1–2	0–0	1–3	1–0	1–1	1–1	0–2	5–0	1–1	0–0	2–1	2–0	1–3	1–0	3–2	0–2	1–1		1–0	4–3	4–0
Spennymoor United	0–0	3–2	2–1	1–2	1–5	0–2	1–3	0–1	0–0	1–2	2–3	3–1	1–2	4–1	1–1	5–0	1–1	0–1	0–0	6–0		2–0	1–1
Winsford United	1–1	1–0	4–2	1–2	1–2	0–2	0–1	1–1	0–1	3–0	2–2	1–0	1–1	1–1	2–1	3–1	0–1	0–2	0–1	0–0	1–1		1–1
Witton Albion	0–1	1–1	1–3	2–2	1–1	1–1	1–0	2–2	2–2	1–0	1–4	0–2	2–1	2–1	0–0	1–3	1–2	1–2	2–2	1–5	1–2	1–3	

Updated to match(es) played on 3 May 1997. Source: Northern Premier Division results grid
Legend: Blue = home team win; Yellow = draw; Red = away team win.

== Division One ==
Northern Premier League Division One
- Season: 1996–97
- Champions: Radcliffe Borough
- Promoted: Leigh RMI; Radcliffe Borough
- Relegated: Atherton L.R. Curzon Ashton; Warrington Town
- Matches: 462
- Goals: 1,281 (2.77 per match)

Division One featured four new teams:

- Droylsden relegated from the Premier Division
- Flixton promoted as champions from the NWCFL Division One
- Matlock Town relegated from the Premier Division
- Stocksbridge Park Steels promoted as runners-up from the NCEFL Premier Division

=== League table ===
Pos	Team	Pld	W	D	L	GF	GA	GD	Pts	Promotion or relegation
1	Radcliffe Borough (C, P)	42	26	7	9	77	33	+44	85	Promotion to Premier Division
2	Leigh RMI (P)	42	24	11	7	65	33	+32	83	Promotion to Premier Division
3	Lincoln United	42	25	8	9	78	47	+31	83	
4	Farsley Celtic	42	23	8	11	75	48	+27	77	
5	Worksop Town	42	20	12	10	68	38	+30	72	
6	Stocksbridge Park Steels	42	19	11	12	66	54	+12	68	
7	Bradford Park Avenue	42	20	8	14	58	50	+8	68	
8	Ashton United	42	17	14	11	73	52	+21	65	
9	Great Harwood Town	42	16	12	14	56	46	+10	60	
10	Droylsden	42	15	14	13	69	67	+2	59	
11	Matlock Town	42	16	9	17	60	69	−9	57	
12	Whitley Bay	42	14	12	16	47	54	−7	54	
13	Flixton	42	15	7	20	57	72	−15	52	
14	Netherfield	42	12	14	16	54	56	−2	50	
15	Eastwood Town	42	12	14	16	42	49	−7	50	
16	Gretna	42	11	17	14	55	67	−12	50	
17	Harrogate Town	42	13	8	21	54	76	−22	47	
18	Congleton Town	42	12	9	21	47	64	−17	45	
19	Workington	42	10	12	20	45	63	−18	42	
20	Curzon Ashton (R)	42	8	10	24	48	79	−31	34	Relegation to NCEFL Premier Division
21	Warrington Town (R)	42	5	18	19	42	79	−37	33	Relegation to NWCFL Division One
22	Atherton Laburnum Rovers (R)	42	7	9	26	45	85	−40	30	Relegation to NWCFL Division One

Updated to match(es) played on May 1997. Source: .
Rules for classification: 1) points; 2) goal difference; 3) number of goals scored.
(C) Champions; (P) Promoted; (R) Relegated

== Promotion and relegation ==
In the twenty-ninth season of the Northern Premier League Leek Town (as champions) were automatically promoted to the Football Conference. Witton Albion and Buxton were relegated to the First Division while Knowsley United left the League at the end of the season. Boston United moved to the Southern League. These clubs were replaced by relegated Conference side Altrincham, First Division winners Radcliffe Borough and second placed Leigh RMI. In the First Division Curzon Ashton, Warrington Town and Atherton Laburnum Rovers left the League at the end of the season and were replaced by newly admitted Whitby Town, Belper Town and Trafford.

== Cup Results ==
Challenge Cup: Teams from both leagues.

- Gainsborough Trinity bt. Boston United

President's Cup: 'Plate' competition for losing teams in the NPL Cup.

- Blyth Spartans bt. Runcorn

Peter Swales Shield: Between Champions of NPL Premier Division and Winners of the NPL Cup.

- Gainsborough Trinity bt. Leek Town
