= 1996–97 Northern Football League =

The 1996–97 Northern Football League season was the 99th in the history of Northern Football League, a football competition in England.

== Division One ==
Northern Football League Division One
- Season: 1996–97
- Champions: Whitby Town
- Promoted: Whitby Town
- Relegated: Chester-le-Street Town; Whickham; West Auckland Town
- Matches: 380
- Goals: 1,412 (3.72 per match)

Division One featured 17 clubs which competed in the division last season, along with three new clubs, promoted from Division Two:

- Easington Colliery
- Morpeth Town
- South Shields

=== League table ===
Pos	Team	Pld	W	D	L	GF	GA	GD	Pts	Promotion or relegation
1	Whitby Town	38	32	3	3	131	37	+94	99	Promoted to the Northern Premier League Division One
2	Billingham Synthonia	38	28	6	4	109	46	+63	90	
3	Bedlington Terriers	38	28	5	5	113	37	+76	86 (Note: Bedlington Terriers were deducted three points.)	
4	Durham City	38	19	11	8	69	50	+19	68	
5	Crook Town	38	19	9	10	88	56	+32	66	
6	Morpeth Town	38	20	6	12	73	56	+17	66	
7	Guisborough Town	38	17	9	12	68	54	+14	60	
8	Tow Law Town	38	14	11	13	76	70	+6	53	
9	South Shields	38	13	11	14	52	63	−11	50	
10	Murton	38	15	5	18	58	80	−22	50	
11	Consett	38	12	11	15	65	59	+6	47	
12	Dunston Federation Brewery	38	12	10	16	64	70	−6	46	
13	Shildon	38	13	7	18	72	86	−14	46	
14	Easington Colliery	38	12	8	18	56	72	−16	44	
15	RTM Newcastle	38	13	3	22	66	87	−21	42	
16	Seaham Red Star	38	7	14	17	50	83	−33	35	
17	Stockton	38	8	10	20	70	105	−35	34	
18	Chester-le-Street Town	38	7	12	19	53	86	−33	33	Relegated to Division Two
19	Whickham	38	5	6	27	38	98	−60	21	Relegated to Division Two
20	West Auckland Town	38	6	3	29	41	117	−76	21	Relegated to Division Two

Source: fchd
Rules for classification: 1) points; 2) goal difference; 3) number of goals scored.

== Division Two ==
Northern Football League Division Two
- Season: 1996–97
- Champions: Northallerton Town
- Promoted: Northallerton Town; Billingham Town; Jarrow Roofing BCA
- Relegated: Ferryhill Athletic
- Matches: 342
- Goals: 1,246 (3.64 per match)

Division Two featured 16 clubs which competed in the division last season, along with four new clubs.

- Clubs relegated from Division One:
  - Eppleton Colliery Welfare
  - Ferryhill Athletic
  - Peterlee Newtown
- Plus:
  - Jarrow Roofing BCA, joined from the Wearside Football League

=== League table ===
Pos	Team	Pld	W	D	L	GF	GA	GD	Pts	Promotion or relegation
1	Northallerton Town	36	25	6	5	98	41	+57	81	Promoted to Division One
2	Billingham Town	36	24	6	6	111	39	+72	75 (Note: Billingham Town were deducted three points.)	Promoted to Division One
3	Jarrow Roofing BCA	36	23	6	7	88	34	+54	75	Promoted to Division One
4	Ashington	36	22	5	9	71	38	+33	71	
5	Evenwood Town	36	21	4	11	84	46	+38	67	
6	Horden Colliery Welfare	36	20	7	9	67	37	+30	64 (Note: Horden Colliery Welfare were deducted three points.)	
7	Prudhoe Town	36	18	10	8	73	48	+25	64	
8	Shotton Comrades	36	20	6	10	91	43	+48	63 (Note: Shotton Comrades were deducted three points.)	
9	Willington	36	18	7	11	78	54	+24	61	
10	Peterlee Newtown	36	16	8	12	56	56	0	56	
11	Hebburn	36	16	3	17	66	61	+5	51	
12	Ryhope Community	36	12	5	19	50	70	−20	41	
13	Norton & Stockton Ancients	36	11	7	18	47	58	−11	37 (Note: Norton & Stockton Ancients were deducted three points.)	
14	Brandon United	36	10	7	19	64	76	−12	37	
15	Alnwick Town	36	11	4	21	55	79	−24	34 (Note: Alnwick Town were deducted three points.)	
16	Eppleton Colliery Welfare	36	6	7	23	44	110	−66	25	
17	Washington	36	6	7	23	43	79	−36	22 (Note: Washington were deducted three points.)	
18	Esh Winning	36	7	3	26	44	100	−56	21 (Note: Esh Winning were deducted three points.)	
19	Ferryhill Athletic	36	1	2	33	16	177	−161	5	Relegated to the Wearside Football League
20	Darlington Cleveland Social	0	0	0	0	0	0	0	0	Club folded, record expunged

Source: fchd
Rules for classification: 1) points; 2) goal difference; 3) number of goals scored.
