= 1997–98 Northern Football League =

The 1997–98 Northern Football League season was the 100th in the history of Northern Football League, a football competition in England.

== Division One ==
Northern Football League Division One
- Season: 1997–98
- Champions: Bedlington Terriers
- Relegated: Durham City; Northallerton Town; Murton
- Matches: 380
- Goals: 1,384 (3.64 per match)

Division One featured 16 clubs which competed in the division last season, along with four new clubs.

- Promoted from Division Two:
  - Billingham Town
  - Jarrow Roofing BCA
  - Northallerton Town
- Plus:
  - Penrith, transferred from the North West Counties League

=== League table ===
Pos	Team	Pld	W	D	L	GF	GA	GD	Pts	Promotion or relegation
1	Bedlington Terriers	38	29	3	6	120	32	+88	90	
2	Billingham Synthonia	38	23	9	6	81	36	+45	78	
3	Guisborough Town	38	23	6	9	84	53	+31	75	
4	Dunston Federation Brewery	38	21	10	7	69	35	+34	73	
5	RTM Newcastle	38	20	5	13	92	70	+22	65	
6	Penrith	38	19	8	11	81	62	+19	65	
7	Morpeth Town	38	16	14	8	75	48	+27	62	
8	South Shields	38	15	19	4	65	38	+27	61 (Note: South Shields were deducted three points.)	
9	Shildon	38	16	7	15	77	87	−10	55	
10	Billingham Town	38	17	2	19	72	79	−7	53	
11	Tow Law Town	38	16	7	15	78	61	+17	52 (Note: Tow Law Town were deducted three points.)	
12	Consett	38	13	11	14	60	62	−2	50	
13	Jarrow Roofing BCA	38	11	12	15	64	70	−6	45	
14	Crook Town	38	12	7	19	58	67	−9	43	
15	Seaham Red Star	38	12	7	19	60	83	−23	43	
16	Easington Colliery	38	13	6	19	77	97	−20	42 (Note: Easington Colliery were deducted three points.)	
17	Stockton	38	10	10	18	54	65	−11	40	
18	Durham City	38	10	7	21	55	67	−12	37	Relegated to Division Two
19	Northallerton Town	38	4	6	28	39	102	−63	18	Relegated to Division Two
20	Murton	38	2	0	36	23	170	−147	3 (Note: Murton were deducted three points.)	Relegated to Division Two

Source: fchd
Rules for classification: 1) points; 2) goal difference; 3) number of goals scored.

== Division Two ==
Northern Football League Division Two
- Season: 1997–98
- Champions: Chester-le-Street Town
- Promoted: Chester-le-Street Town; West Auckland Town; Marske United
- Matches: 342
- Goals: 1,226 (3.58 per match)

Division Two featured 15 clubs which competed in the division last season, along with four new clubs.

- Clubs relegated from Division One:
  - Chester-le-Street Town
  - West Auckland Town
  - Whickham
- Plus:
  - Marske United, joined from the Wearside Football League

=== League table ===
Pos	Team	Pld	W	D	L	GF	GA	GD	Pts	Promotion or relegation
1	Chester-le-Street Town	36	29	3	4	105	27	+78	90	Promoted to Division One
2	West Auckland Town	36	24	8	4	84	36	+48	80	Promoted to Division One
3	Marske United	36	24	5	7	78	30	+48	77	Promoted to Division One
4	Prudhoe Town	36	20	5	11	87	58	+29	62	
5	Ashington	36	18	7	11	75	52	+23	61	
6	Willington	36	16	6	14	87	65	+22	54	
7	Peterlee Newtown	36	16	7	13	60	55	+5	55 (Note: Peterlee Newtown were deducted three points.)	
8	Evenwood Town	36	14	9	13	62	62	0	51	
9	Alnwick Town	36	15	5	16	68	63	+5	50	
10	Norton & Stockton Ancients	36	14	7	15	58	56	+2	49	
11	Shotton Comrades	36	13	8	15	66	61	+5	47	
12	Hebburn	36	12	10	14	57	43	+14	46	
13	Ryhope Community	36	12	10	14	60	63	−3	46	
14	Horden Colliery Welfare	36	12	8	16	58	67	−9	44	
15	Whickham	36	14	7	15	51	66	−15	43 (Note: Whickham were deducted six points.)	
16	Esh Winning	36	11	9	16	58	79	−21	42	
17	Brandon United	36	11	6	19	59	87	−28	39	
18	Eppleton Colliery Welfare	36	4	4	28	29	103	−74	16	
19	Washington	36	1	0	35	24	153	−129	3	

Source: fchd
Rules for classification: 1) points; 2) goal difference; 3) number of goals scored.
