= Knutsford F.C. =

Association football club in England

Knutsford
- Full name: Knutsford Football Club
- Founded: 1888
- Ground: Manchester Road; Knutsford
- Chairman: Jimmy Evans
- Manager: Nick Ward
- League: Cheshire League League One
- 2025–26: Cheshire League League One, 6th of 16
Home colours

Knutsford Football Club are a football club based in the town of Knutsford, Cheshire. The club was founded in 1888 and today play their football in the Cheshire League League One. They are the only founding member to have stayed in the league since its formation in 1948.

== History ==
The club was formed in 1888 and according to articles from notes from the Northwich Guardian dated 1888 the club played their games at The Heath. "Rugby was to be allowed and there was already Football played on the Heath". These notes are stored in the towns heritage centre. The first known record of a formal Knutsford Team comes from 29 December 1888 when, "On Boxing Day, the Knutsford Football Club greatly distinguished themselves on the Heath against the Manchester ‘Aberdeen’ Club – being successful in scoring 14 goals to nil. In the late 1880s – early 1890s organised local leagues and district cup competitions were formed in Northwich, Crewe, Sale and Manchester. Knutsford Teams competed in organised friendlies and then these Leagues with various names playing on the Heath and a ground off Manchester Road. The earliest known record (from the Guardian archives) of a senior Knutsford Team playing in a recognised League The Manchester Federation League – is for season 1898–99 – when Knutsford Parish Church Association Football Club – playing on the Mere Heath Ground won their very first trophy (the Manchester Federation Championship Trophy) on Saturday 14 April 1899.

The current Knutsford F.C. were formed on 22 February 1946 as Knutsford Athletic, before renaming to their current name in time for their first game in August 1946. They played their first two seasons in the Northwich & District League. It was then that they became founding members of the Mid-Cheshire League in 1948 in which they have played in ever since. They have won the league on one occasion (1994–95) and have been runners-up three times.

In 1949 they made their only appearance in the F.A. Cup, being knocked out 0–9 at home by Northwich Victoria in the preliminary qualification round.

During the 2014–15 season Knutsford F.C. enjoyed the newly founded support of a group known as the "Knutsford Knutters".

== Honours ==
- Cheshire Association Football League
  - Champions 1994–95, 2011–12, 2012–13, 2015–16
  - Runners-up 1958–59, 1991–92, 1997–98, 2006–07, 2014–15

Cheshire Amateur Cup Champions 2017–18

== Records ==
- FA Cup
  - Preliminary Round 1949–50
