= Atherton Collieries A.F.C. =

Association football club in Greater Manchester, England

Coordinates: 53°31′24.64″N 2°29′05.90″W

Atherton Collieries
- Full name: Atherton Collieries Association Football Club
- Nickname: Colls
- Founded: 1916
- Ground: Alder House, Atherton
- Capacity: 2,500
- Chairman: Paul Gregory
- Manager: Daniel Lafferty
- League: Northern Premier League Division One West
- 2025–26: Northern Premier League Division One West, 13th of 22
Home colours	Away colours	Third colours

Centenary badge, used as the club crest for 2016–17.

Atherton Collieries Association Football Club is a football club based in Atherton, Greater Manchester, England. The club are currently members of the Northern Premier League Division One West and play at Alder House. They are full members of the Lancashire County Football Association.

Between 1919 and 1965 Atherton Collieries were winners of the Bolton Combination ten times. By 1964–65 they had won the Lancashire FA Amateur Shield six times, a record which is still unsurpassed. They are nicknamed "Colls".

== History ==
The club was established in 1916 by miners from the six pits in Atherton Urban District with the aim of raising money for locals involved in the war effort. After World War I the club joined the Bolton Combination, winning the title in their first season. The season also saw them win the Lancashire FA Amateur Shield, beating Dumers Lane 3–2 after extra time. They joined the Lancashire Alliance in 1921, and won the Shield again in 1923 with a 4–1 against Barnoldswick Town. The club later returned to the Bolton Combination, winning the league in 1936–37, 1937–38, 1938–39 and 1940–41, followed by another Lancashire FA Amateur Shield in 1942 after Royal Engineers were beaten 3–2. Another title came in 1944–45, after which the club joined the Manchester League for the 1945–46 season.

Their first season in the new league saw them finish third and win the Shield for a fourth time with a 3–2 win over Moss Rovers in 1948 the club joined the West Lancashire League, in which they spent two seasons before joining Division Two of the Lancashire Combination in 1950. However, after finishing sixteenth (out of 22) in 1950–51 and second-from-bottom in 1951–52 they left the league to rejoin the Bolton Combination. Back in the local league, they won the league title again in 1956–57 (also winning the Shield, beating Burnley Albion 3–2 after extra time), 1958–59, 1960–61 and 1964–65 (combined with another Shield win, this time by beating Breightmet United 6–1). In 1971 they rejoined the Lancashire Combination, which was now a single division.

Following their only top-half finish in the league in 1977–78, the club switched to the new Division Two of the Cheshire County League, where they failed to break into the top half of the table during their four years in the league. At the end of the 1981–82 season the league merged with the Lancashire Combination to form the North West Counties League, with Atherton placed in Division Three. This started a spell of relative success for the club, who finished in the top half of the table for four successive seasons, before winning the title in 1986–87 and earning promotion to Division Two.

After nine seasons in Division Two, Atherton were runners-up in 1995–96, resulting in promotion to Division One. In 2001–02 they won the Goldline Trophy with a 1–0 win against Charnock Richard at the Reebok Stadium. Division One was renamed the Premier Division in 2008, but the following season saw the club finish bottom of the Division, leading to relegation to Division One. Following their demotion, the club consistently finished in the top six in the division and won the Division One Trophy in 2010–11. After winning the division in 2014–15 they were promoted back to the Premier Division. In 2015–16 they won the League Cup, beating Colne 5–1 in the final. The following season saw the club win the Premier Division, earning promotion to Division One North of the Northern Premier League. They won the League Challenge Cup in 2017–18, beating Coalville Town 2–1 in the final.

The 2018–19 season saw Atherton placed in Division One West as the Northern Premier League's second tier was reorganised on an east–west basis. They went on to win the division, earning promotion to the Premier Division. The 2023–24 season saw the club finish bottom of the Premier Division, resulting in relegation back to Division One West.

== Ground ==
The club have played at Alder House since their establishment, and it is currently known as 'The Skuna Stadium' for sponsorship purposes. At some point during their tenure, the pitch was rotated 90º, and floodlights were installed in 1994. One stand was described "leaning forward as if in prayer for its continued survival", before it was demolished in 2007. Following ground works crowdfunded by supporters in 2020, the ground currently has two stands with covered seating, with two more covered stands for standing spectators, one of which has been expanded to provide cover for disabled spectators. Alongside the clubhouse, the ground has an additional two outdoors refreshment facilities.

== Recent managerial history ==
Term	Manager
1993–1994	Alan Lord
1994–1997	Steve Walton & Ian Lamb
June 1997	Steve Vychinski
August–December 1997	Dennis Haslam
1997–1998	Tommy Harrison
June–September 1998	Brian Smith
1998–2000	Alan Lord
October 2000 – February 2001	Chris O'Brien & Paul Kirkman
2001–2002	Dennis Haslam & Tommy Foster
2002–2003	Joe Murty
2003–2006	Alan Lord
2006–2007	Phil Brown
2007–2009	Dave Conlon
2009–2014	Steve Pilling
2014–2019	Michael Clegg
2019–2023	Bradley Cooke
2023–2024	David Chadwick
2024–2025	Michael Clegg
2026–	Daniel Lafferty

== Honours ==
- Northern Premier League
  - Division One West champions 2018–19
  - Challenge Cup winners 2017–18
- North West Counties League
  - Premier Division champions 2016–17
  - Division One champions 2014–15
  - Division Three champions 1986–87
  - League Cup winners 2015–16
  - Division One Trophy winners 2010–11
- Bolton Combination
  - Champions 1919–20, 1936–37, 1937–38, 1938–39, 1940–41, 1944–45, 1956–57, 1958–59, 1960–61, 1964–65
- Lancashire County FA Amateur Shield
  - Winners 1919–20, 1922–23, 1941–42, 1945–46, 1956–57, 1964–65
- Bolton Hospital Cup
  - Winners 1973–74, 1986–87, 2011–12, 2014–15

== Records ==
- Record attendance: 3,300 in the Bolton Combination in the 1920s
- Best FA Cup performance: Fourth qualifying round, 2026–27
- Best FA Trophy performance: First round, 2019–20
- Best FA Vase performance: Fifth round, 2016–17

== See also ==
- Atherton Collieries A.F.C. players
- Atherton Collieries A.F.C. managers
