= Newcastle Town F.C. =

English football club

Coordinates: 52°59′51.57″N 2°12′53.70″W

Newcastle Town
- Full name: Newcastle Town Football Club
- Nicknames: The Castle, Castle
- Founded: 1964
- Ground: Lyme Valley Stadium, Newcastle-under-Lyme
- Capacity: 4,000 (300 seated)
- Chairman: Gavin Appleby
- Manager: Neil Baker
- League: Northern Premier League Division One West
- 2025–26: Northern Premier League Division One West, 14th of 22
- Website: newcastletownfc.co.uk
Home colours	Away colours

Newcastle Town Football Club is a football club based in Newcastle-under-Lyme, Staffordshire, England. They are currently members of the Northern Premier League Division One West and play at the Lyme Valley Stadium.

== History ==
The club was formed as a Sunday league team in 1964. They joined Division Two of the Mid-Cheshire League in 1982 and went on to win the division at the first attempt, losing only one game all season and scoring 102 goals in 30 games. The league was then reduced to a single division and the club went on to win the League Cup in 1984–85 and the league title in 1985–86. With the club in financial difficulties, they then merged with Parkway Clayton. After winning the Sentinel Shield and finishing as runners-up in the Mid-Cheshire League in 1986–87, the club were promoted to Division Two of the North West Counties League.

Newcastle Town were Division Two runners-up in 1991–92, earning promotion to Division One. The following season saw them win the league's Floodlit Cup. They won the Walsall Senior Cup in 1993–94 and retained it the following season, as well as winning the Sentinel Cup. the club were Division One runners-up as well as winning the Floodlit Cup for a second time in 1995–96. In 1996–97 they reached the first round of the FA Cup for the first time, losing 2–0 at home to Notts County in front of a record crowd of 3,948 in a match played at Stoke City's Victoria Ground. The season also saw them finish as runners-up in Division One and win the League Cup. The club went on to finish as runners-up in Division One again in 1999–2000, also reaching the FA Vase semi-finals, where they lost 3–1 on aggregate to Deal Town.

In 2004–05 Newcastle Town were Division One runners-up for a fourth time. Division One was renamed the Premier Division in 2008 and the club were Premier Division champions in 2009–10, earning promotion to Division One South of the Northern Premier League; they also won the Staffordshire Senior Cup, beating Port Vale 6–1 in the final. The club were Division One South runners-up the following season, qualifying for the promotion play-offs, but lost 3–0 to Grantham Town in the semi-finals. A third-place finish in 2014–15 was followed by a 3–1 defeat by Sutton Coldfield Town in the play-off semi-finals.

== Ground ==
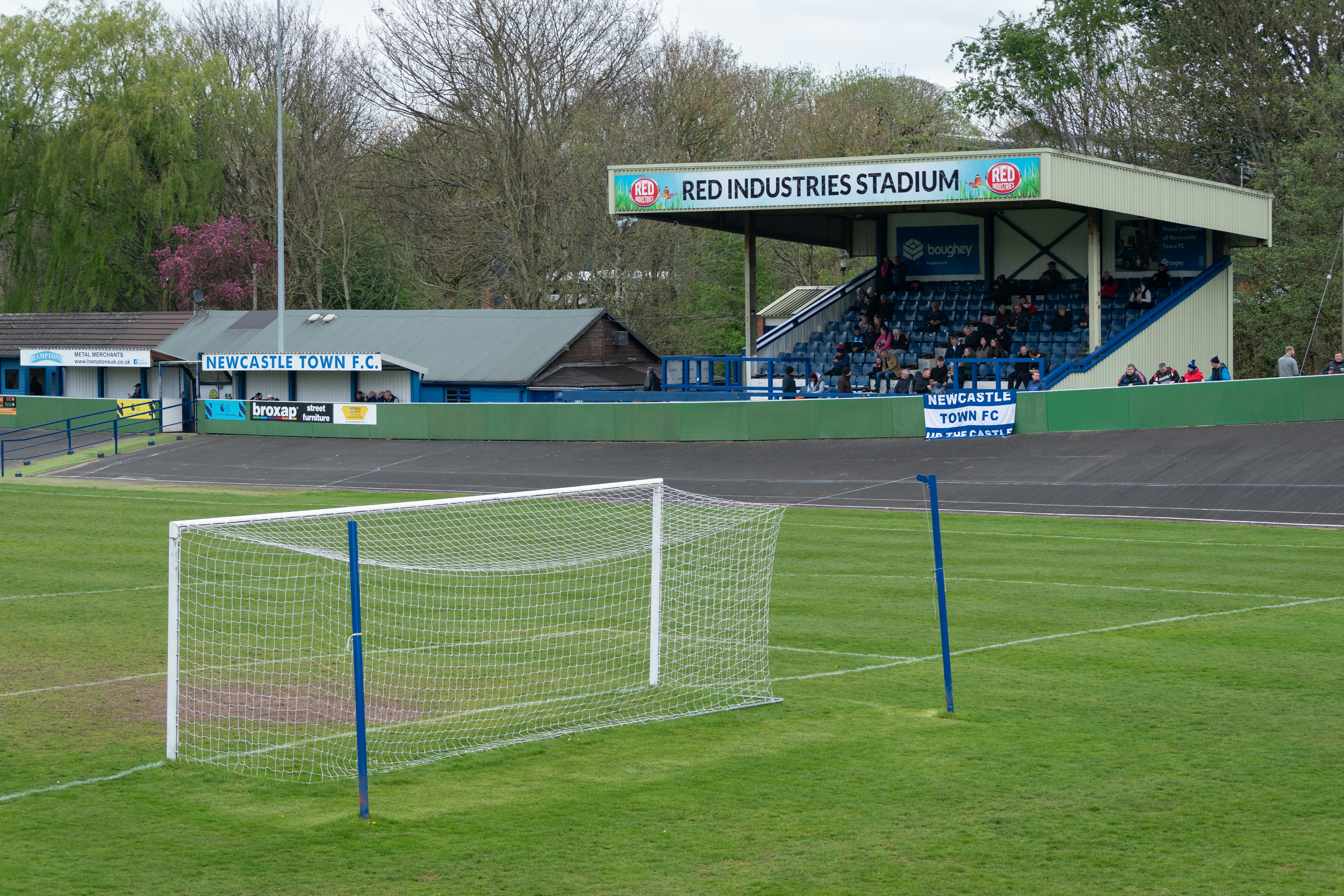
Lyme Valley Stadium

The club play at the Lyme Valley Stadium, next to the Lyme Brook on Buckmaster Avenue. The ground doubles as a velodrome, with a cycling track around the pitch. The ground includes a seated stand on one side of the pitch and a covered standing terrace on the other. Both ends of the ground consist of uncovered standing areas. It currently has a capacity of 4,000, of which 300 is seated and 1,000 covered.

== Honours ==
- North West Counties League
  - Premier Division champions 2009–10
  - League Cup winners 1996–97
  - Floodlit Cup winners 1992–93, 1995–96
  - Division Two Trophy winners 1991–92
- Mid-Cheshire League
  - Division One champions 1985–86
  - Division Two champions 1982–83
  - League Cup winners 1984–85
- Walsall Senior Cup
  - Winners 1993–94 1994–95
- Staffordshire Senior Cup
  - Winners 2009–10
- Staffordshire FA Sunday Cup
  - Winners 1979–80
- Sentinel Cup
  - Winners 1994–95
- Sentinel Shield
  - Winners 1986–87

== Records ==
- Best FA Cup performance: First round, 1996–97
- Best FA Trophy performance: Third qualifying round, 2020–21, 2021–22
- Best FA Vase performance: Semi-finals, 1999–2000
- Record attendance: 3,948 vs Notts County, FA Cup first round, 1996 (at the Victoria Ground)
- Most appearances: Dean Gillick, 632
- Most goals: Andy Bott, 149

== See also ==
- Newcastle Town F.C. players
- Newcastle Town F.C. managers
