= Garswood United A.F.C. =

Association football club in England

Coordinates: 53°29′51.59″N 2°40′56.04″W

Garswood United
- Full name: Garswood United Association Football Club
- Founded: 1967
- Ground: CleanHire Community Stadium, Simms Lane End, Garswood
- League: Cheshire League Premier Division
- 2024–25: Cheshire League Premier Division, 11th of 16

Garswood United Association Football Club is an English football club based in Garswood, near St Helens, in the ceremonial county of Merseyside and traditional (historic) county of Lancashire.

The club is a member of the Cheshire League Premier Division and plays at Simms Lane End.

== History ==
The club was established in 1967. It joined Division Two of the Mid-Cheshire League in 1988. After winning the division in their second season, it was promoted to Division One. In 1995–96, Garswood United won Division One, and was promoted to Division Two of the North West Counties League. The club finished third in its first season in the NWCL and eighth in its second, but then left the league to return to the Mid-Cheshire League, which was renamed the Cheshire League in 2007. The team were the inaugural winners of the Cheshire League President's Cup in 1999/99. In 2019/20, the club was promoted to the Cheshire League's Premier Division.

== Honours ==
- Mid-Cheshire League
  - Division One champions 1995–96, 2013–14
  - Division Two champions 1987–88, 1997–98
- Mid Cheshire League Division One League Cup
  - Winners 2005–06
- Wigan Cup
  - Winners 2005–06, 2007–08, 2009–10, 2013–14
- Mid Cheshire League Hospitality Club
  - Winners 2008–09
- Mid Cheshire Fair Play Award
  - Winners 2009–10
