= Bootle F.C. =

English football club

Coordinates: 53°28′16.82″N 2°57′38.11″W

Bootle
- Full name: Bootle Football Club
- Nickname: The Bucks
- Founded: 1953 (as Langton)
- Ground: New Bucks Park, Bootle
- Capacity: 2,500
- Chairman: Joe Doran
- Manager: Alan Morgan
- League: Northern Premier League Division One West
- 2025–26: Northern Premier League Division One West, 6th of 22
Home colours	Away colours

Bootle Football Club is an English football club based in Bootle, Merseyside. The club are members of the Northern Premier League Division One West and play at New Bucks Park.

== History ==
=== Previous clubs in Bootle ===
The original Bootle F.C. were formed in 1879 and played their first fixture in 1880 on Hawthorne Road, adjacent to Bootle Cricket Club. The club were Everton F.C.'s main rivals and competed with Everton for the prestigious place in the newly formed Football League. Because only one club per area were permitted to join, Bootle narrowly lost out, despite the fact that in the run up to the decision Everton were banned from both the FA Cup and the Liverpool Senior Cup the previous year. However, Bootle lost out, and in 1889–90, Bootle became founder members of the Football Alliance. That season was the most successful as the club finished league runners-up and reached the quarter-finals of the FA Cup, losing to Blackburn Rovers. When the Alliance merged with the Football League in 1892, Bootle became founder members of the new Football League Second Division. However, despite finishing in a respectable 8th place, the club dropped out after one season due to ongoing financial problems. Ironically, a new local club, Liverpool, took Bootle's place in the second division.

The possible resurrection of a Bootle team became a distinct probability in August 1947 when local councillors identified the popularity and talent on show in the ‘Bootle JOC’ league and knew the town was big enough to be put back on the football map with its own team again. For years, it had been an exporter of its many players to other clubs, both professional and semi-professional. The promise of sponsorship money from local businesses brought great optimism and the issue of one shilling shares further boosted club finances. After local residents were assured that the ground at Bootle Stadium (Maguire Avenue) would not be used solely as a football ground, an application to join the Lancashire Combination for the 1948–49 season was made, and accepted. Club colours even posed a problem; red or blue were dismissed for fear of showing favour to either of the ‘big two’ so it was agreed that, as the original Bootle FC wore white shorts, this colour would be adopted. Players mostly came from the local league and surrounding clubs, however one player that Bootle overlooked was a tall ex-prisoner-of-war German, Bert Trautmann. Trautman, then living in Huyton, trained with Bootle at the stadium for several weeks but, with the area taking such a heavy pounding during the war, it was decided not to tempt any local bitterness and he was allowed to join St Helens Town and later moved on to FA Cup and Manchester City folklore. They kicked off their new campaign in 1948 against Barnoldswick and district. The league was won at the first attempt. However, Bootle struggled in the top-flight and after several tough seasons and also a change in Council priorities they withdrew from the league and folded during the 1953–54 campaign.

=== Modern club ===
In 1953, the current club was formed as Langton with Frank Doran Senior and Ben Dunning being two of the founding members. The club played in the various local Bootle leagues. After a successful spell in the Liverpool County Combination, winning multiple leagues and cups, the club requested to change its name to the latest incarnation of Bootle FC. This was accepted in 1973 and a year later ‘the Bucks’ joined the Lancashire Combination.

After winning the Combination in both 1976 and 1977, Bootle then joined the Second Division of the Cheshire County League, which was won in the first season, and were promoted to the First Division. In 1982 the Cheshire County League was one of the leagues that merged to form the North West Counties League, which Bootle duly joined, becoming a member of the First Division (Which is now called the Premier Division). The club spent most of their time in the First Division until 2000 when the club was relegated to the Second Division.

However, despite finishing 6th in 2002, the club dropped into the Liverpool County Combination as Bucks Park on Copy Lane closed its doors for the final time. In 2006 the club, with a new ground on Vesty Road, were elected back into Division 2 of the North West Counties League. In 2009 Bootle won promotion to the NWCFL Premier Division and also won the Championship. In 2009–10, the first season back in the NWCFL Premier Division Bootle finished a NWCFL high for the first time reaching 3rd place. In 2010–11 finished 6th place. They equalled the 3rd place again in 2012. More success followed in 2013 when the club lifted the Liverpool Senior Cup.

In 2017, Bootle finished runners-up for the first time in the NWCFL Premier Division, losing out to Atherton Collieries for the title.

In 2019, the Bucks missed out on the title yet again, finishing runner-up after a 20-match winning streak was halted by a final day draw at home to Northwich Victoria saw City of Liverpool claim the league.

The club was promoted to the Northern Premier league west division at the start of the 2021–22 season. After a difficult start to the season, long-standing manager Joe Dorian resigned from his position stating that he “Had taken the club as far as possible.”

Shortly after, Joe Johnson took over the club and was appointed trustee with his company Berry Street Garage becoming the main club sponsor.

== Notable former players ==
Players who have gone on to play for professional clubs include:

- Lee Steele
- Larry Carberry

== Honours ==
- North West Counties League
  - Division One champions 2008–09
- Cheshire County League
  - Division Two champions 1978–79
- Lancashire Combination
  - Champions 1975–76, 1976–77
- Liverpool Senior Cup
  - Winners 2012–13
- Liverpool County Football Combination
  - Champions 1964–65, 1965–66, 1967–68,1968–69, 1969–70, 1970–71,1971–72, 1972–73, 1973–74
- Liverpool Challenge Cup
  - Winners 1964–65, 1975–76,1978–79
- Liverpool Amateur Cup
  - Winners 1965–66, 1967–68,1973–74

== Records ==
- Best FA Cup performance: Third Qualifying Round, 1990–91
- Best FA Trophy performance: Second Round, 1980–81 (replay)
- Best FA Vase performance: 4th Round, 2008–09
- North West Counties League Division 1 Champions 2008–09
