= Cheshire Association Football League =

Association football league in England

- Founded: 1948
- Country: England
- Region: Cheshire
- Confederation: Cheshire FA
- Divisions: Premier Division; League One; League Two; Reserves Division One; Reserves Division Two
- Number of clubs: 46 (Premier, One, Two)
- Level on pyramid: Level 11 (Premier Division)
- Promotion to: North West Counties League (Division One South)
- Relegation to: Hope Valley Amateur League Premier Division
- Domestic cup(s): J A Walton Challenge Cup; JB Parker Premier cup
- Current champions: Poynton FC (Premier Division); Bollington Town (League One); St. Helens Town (League Two) (2024–25)
- Website: cheshirefl.com

The Cheshire Association Football League is a football competition based in Cheshire, England, which until 2007 was known as the Mid-Cheshire Association Football League. Founded in 1948, only one club (Knutsford) have maintained continuous membership since the formation of the league. Another two founder members left the league in 2012 (Whitchurch Alport) and 2014 (Barnton).

The Premier Division sits at step 7 of the National League Pyramid, level 11 in the English Football Pyramid.

== 2026–27 members ==
=== Premier Division ===
- Bollington Town
- Broadheath Central
- Daten
- Denton Town
- Eagle Sports
- FC St Helens Reserves
- Golborne Sports
- Lostock Gralam
- Middlewich Town
- Parklands
- Poynton
- Skelmersdale Town
- St Helens Town
- St Michaels DH
- Vulcan
- Whalley Range

=== League One ===
- Egerton
- Garswood United
- Knutsford
- Newton-Le-Willows
- Northwich Victoria Reserves
- Stretford Paddock
- Styal
- West Didsbury & Chorlton Reserves
- Whaley Bridge Athletic
- Winsford Town
- Winstanley Warriors

=== League Two ===
- Barnton Reserves
- Billinge FC
- Cheadle Heath Nomads Reserves
- Congleton Town Reserves
- Haydock
- Maine Road Reserves
- Mersey Valley
- Moore United
- Pilkington U23
- Upton
- Warrington Rylands Development
- Wythenshawe Reserves

=== League Three ===
- AFC Wigan
- Crewe Reserves
- Flixton Reserves
- Hartford
- Lymm Rovers
- Nantwich Town Reserves
- Richmond Rovers
- Sandbach Town
- Trafford Reserves
- Tytherington
- Wigan Town

== Previous divisional champions ==
Season	Division One	Division Two
1979–80	Barnton	Prescot B I Reserves
1980–81	Rylands	Handforth Irwin
1981–82	Hanley Town	Intex
1982–83	Barnton	Newcastle Town
1983–84	Rylands	—N/a (Note: The league operated only a single division from 1983 until 1987.)
1984–85	Bramhall	—N/a
1985–86	Newcastle Town	—N/a
1986–87	Kidsgrove Athletic	—N/a
1987–88	Kidsgrove Athletic	Leek Town Reserves
1988–89	Barnton	Wilmslow Albion
1989–90	Grove United	Garswood United
1990–91	Linotype	Newcastle Town Reserves
1991–92	Grove United	Broadheath Central
1992–93	Grove United	Malpas
1993–94	Linotype	Bollington Athletic
1994–95	Knutsford	Cheadle Heath Nomads
1995–96	Garswood United	Bollington Athletic
1996–97	Barnton	Lostock Gralam
1997–98	Barnton	Garswood United Reserves
1998–99	Barnton	Padgate St Oswalds
1999–2000	Barnton	Trafford Reserves
2000–01	Barnton	Broadheath Central
2001–02	Barnton	Crosfields
2002–03	Barnton	Golborne Sports
2003–04	Middlewich Town	Padgate St Oswalds
2004–05	Barnton	Penketh & Sankey Eagle
2005–06	Middlewich Town	Gamesley
2006–07	Middlewich Town	Stalybridge Celtic Reserves
2007–08	Styal	F.C. United of Manchester Reserves
2008–09	Woodley	Golborne Sports
2009–10	Club AZ	Lostock Gralam
2010–11	Greenalls Padgate St. Oswalds	Denton Town
2011–12	Knutsford	Whaley Bridge
2012–13	Knutsford	Barnton
2013–14	Garswood United	Poynton

In 2014, the league expanded to three divisions.

Season	Premier Division	League One	League Two
2014–15	Linotype & Cheadle Heath Nomads	Congleton Vale Rovers	Wythenshawe Town
2015–16	Knutsford	Wythenshawe Town	AFC Macclesfield
2016–17	Whaley Bridge	Billinge	Windle Labour
2017–18	Knutsford	Daten	Ford Motors
2018–19	Pilkington FC	Lostock Gralam	Ashton Athletic Reserves
2019–20	Season cancelled due to COVID-19 pandemic in the United Kingdom		
2020–21	Season cancelled due to COVID-19 pandemic in the United Kingdom		
2021–22	F.C. St Helens	Whalley Range	Golborne Sports
2022–23	Whalley Range	Parklands	Upton JFC
2023–24	Poynton	Golborne Sports	Pilkington FC U23s
2024–25	Poynton	Bollington	St Helens Town
2025–26	Parklands	Daten	Newton-Le-Willows
