= Eppleton Colliery Welfare F.C. =

Former association football club in England

Eppleton Colliery Welfare
- Full name: Eppleton Colliery Welfare Football Club
- Founded: 1929
- Dissolved: 2005
- Ground: Welfare Road
Home colours

Eppleton Colliery Welfare Football Club was an association football club from Hetton-le-Hole, Sunderland, originally in County Durham.

== History ==
The club was founded in 1929. Its first honours of note came in the 1939–40 season, when it won the Seaham & District League, Hetton Charity Cup, and Lumley & Fence Houses Nursing Cup.

After the Second World War, the club joined the North Eastern League, but after four seasons of struggle joined the Wearside League before the 1951–52 season. The club suffered a tragedy before the season started, when its trainer, Jack Walker, was killed in a mine explosion at Eppleton Colliery.

The club remained in the Wearside until 1965. That year the club joined Houghton & District League, winning the title in 1971–72, but, after two games in the 1973–74 season, disbanded due to a lack of support. However, the club was revived before its Football Association membership expired, thanks to a merger with Houghton League side Natcobos, and it re-joined the Wearside League from the 1974–75 season.

In the 1975–76 season, the club had its best run in the FA Cup, reaching the third qualifying round, but lost at that stage 2–1 at Willington, despite taking the lead shortly after half-time. Its most prestigious honour came in 1989–90, when the club won the Durham Challenge Cup for the only time, beating Consett 3–1 at Victoria Park (Hartlepool), both sides scoring penalties in the first quarter of an hour, but goals in the last minute of each half securing the trophy for Eppleton.

In 1992 the club joined the Northern Football League's second division, replacing Gretna, and was promoted in its first season in the competition. After relegation in 1994–95, the club struggled near the foot of the second division, until being relegated from the League at the end of the 2002–03 season, having finished bottom after a 15 point deduction.

The club landed in the Northern Football Alliance Premier League, but was relegated in its first season, its financial straits being to such an extreme that club treasurer Stephen Blunt, whose family company made coffins, auctioned off a coffin in Sunderland colours for £200 to be able to afford to pay referee expenses. After finishing 11th out of 15 in the second division in 2004–05, the club disbanded.

== Colours ==
The club wore all blue.

== Ground ==
The club's ground was the Eppleton Colliery Welfare Ground on Welfare Road.

== Notable players ==
- Charlie Woollett, who played for the club before the Second World War
- Alan Weir, who joined the club in 1984 after a professional career in the north-east

== Honours ==
The club's most prominent honours include:

- Durham Challenge Cup
  - Winner: 1989–90
- Wearside League
  - Winner: 1990–91, 1991–92
- Wearside League Cup
  - Winner: 1974–75, 1978–79, 1987–88
- Sunderland Shipowners' Cup
  - Winner: 1947–48, 1985–86, 1990–91
