= Middlewich Town F.C. =

Association football club in England

Coordinates: 53°11′44.57″N 2°27′02.87″W

Middlewich Town
- Full name: Middlewich Town Football Club
- Nickname: The Witches
- Founded: 1998
- Ground: Seddon Street
- Chairman: Andy Hopley
- Manager: Joe Pointon & Gaz Harwood
- League: Cheshire League Premier Division
- 2024–25: Cheshire League Premier Division, 6th of 16
Home colours	Away colours

Middlewich Town Football Club is a football club based in the Cheshire town of Middlewich. They currently play in the Cheshire League Premier Division.

== History ==
Middlewich has had a town football club since at least 1912, with Middlewich Athletic playing at Seddon Street since 1912. Middlewich Athletic were mid-Cheshire league champions five times between 1952 and 1975. In 1998 Middlewich Town was formed by combining Middlewich Athletic with the Middlewich Town Youth teams, so that the club now has junior squads ranging from under 8s to under 16s, a reserve team and a first XI. Since the name change Middlewich have been runners up in the mid-Cheshire league three times, and won the league once.

== Honours ==
- Mid-Cheshire League/Cheshire League Division One
  - Champions 1961–62, 1964–65, 1971–72, 1972–73, 1974–75, 2003–04, 2005–06, 2006–07
  - Runners-up 1955–56, 1965–66, 1973–74, 1999–2000, 2002–03, 2004–05, 2007–08, 2008–09
- Mid-Cheshire League Division Two
  - Runners-up 1992–93

== Records ==
- FA Amateur Cup
  - Second Round 1973–74
- FA Trophy
- First Qualifying Round 1976–77, 1977–78, 1978–79
- FA Vase
  - Fifth Round 1974–75, 1980–81

== Former players ==
1. Players that have played/managed in the Football League or any foreign equivalent to this level (i.e. fully professional league).
2. Players with full international caps.
3. Players that hold a club record or have captained the club.

- (Scotland) Hughie Reed
