= 1990–91 North West Counties Football League =

The 1990–91 North West Counties Football League season (known as the Bass North West Counties League for sponsorship reasons) was the ninth in the history of the North West Counties Football League, a football competition in England.

The league comprised two divisions (at levels 8 and 9 of the English football league system) and there were additionally three cup competitions: the League Challenge Cup knockout competition (known as the Raab Karcher Cup for sponsorship reasons), open to all the league's clubs; the Second Division Trophy (known as the Lamot Pils Trophy for sponsorship reasons), a knockout trophy competition for Division Two clubs only; and a newly instigated Floodlit Trophy competition open to all the league's clubs with floodlights. The league also had a reserves team section.

== Division One ==
North West Counties Football League Division One
- Season: 1990–91
- Teams: 19
- Champions: Knowsley United
- Promoted: Colwyn Bay; Knowsley United
- Relegated: Salford City
- Matches: 342
- Goals: 1,009 (2.95 per match)

Division One featured 19 clubs, 15 remaining from the previous season plus 4 additional:

- Bacup Borough, promoted as runners-up of Division Two
- Eastwood Hanley, relegated from Northern Premier League Division One
- Maine Road, promoted as champions of Division Two
- Penrith, relegated from Northern Premier League Division One

There were two name changes: Leyland Motors became Leyland DAF-SGL and Salford became Salford City.

At the end of the season the top two clubs were promoted to the Northern Premier League Division One: the champions Knowsley United automatically and Colwyn Bay who won a ballot for the additional club required by the Northern Premier League. Two other clubs left the division: the bottom and only relegated club Salford City; and Leyland DAF-SGL who resigned over a dispute in which the league sought the removal of their sponsors name from their club title (SGL=Station Garage Leyland)

=== League table ===
Pos	Team	Pld	W	D	L	GF	GA	GD	Pts	Season End Notes
1	Knowsley United (C, P)	36	25	8	3	95	37	+58	83	Promoted to Northern Premier League Division One
2	Colwyn Bay (P)	36	22	10	4	85	32	+53	76	Promoted to Northern Premier League Division One
3	Ashton United	36	20	7	9	80	45	+35	67	
4	Eastwood Hanley	36	16	12	8	42	29	+13	60	
5	Vauxhall GM	36	15	10	11	42	36	+6	55	
6	Prescot	36	13	12	11	57	55	+2	51	
7	Flixton	36	14	7	15	48	72	−24	49	
8	St Helens Town	36	13	9	14	52	47	+5	48	
9	Maine Road	36	13	9	14	58	61	−3	48	
10	Skelmersdale United	36	12	11	13	56	49	+7	47	
11	Nantwich Town	36	13	8	15	43	56	−13	47	
12	Leyland DAF-SGL	36	12	10	14	51	53	−2	46	Resigned
13	Bootle	36	10	9	17	55	64	−9	39	
14	Bacup Borough	36	9	12	15	38	47	−9	39	
15	Clitheroe	36	10	8	18	50	63	−13	38	
16	Darwen	36	9	11	16	44	62	−18	38	
17	Penrith	36	10	8	18	41	65	−24	38	
18	Atherton Laburnum Rovers	36	9	11	16	42	68	−26	38	
19	Salford City (R)	36	6	10	20	30	68	−38	28	Relegated to Division Two

Source: NWCFL: Final Tables, Season 1990/91
Rules for classification: 1) points; 2) goal difference; 3) number of goals scored.
(C) Champions; (P) Promoted; (R) Relegated

== Division Two ==
North West Counties Football League Division Two
- Season: 1990–91
- Teams: 18
- Champions: Great Harwood Town
- Promoted: Blackpool Rovers; Bradford Park Avenue; Great Harwood Town
- Relegated: None
- Matches: 306
- Goals: 933 (3.05 per match)

Division Two featured 18 clubs, 12 remaining from the previous season plus 6 additional:

- Bamber Bridge, joined from the Preston and District League
- Bradford Park Avenue, joined from the Central Midlands Football League
- Burscough, relegated from Division One
- Castleton Gabriels, joined from the Manchester Football League
- Chadderton, relegated from Division One
- Kidsgrove Athletic, joined from the Mid-Cheshire Football League

At the end of the season to maintain 18 clubs in Division One next season 3 clubs were promoted, the champions Great Harwood Town, runners-up Blackpool Rovers and third placed Bradford Park Avenue. The bottom two clubs, potentially subject to demotion, both remained in the division.

=== League table ===
Pos	Team	Pld	W	D	L	GF	GA	GD	Pts	Season End Notes
1	Great Harwood Town (C, P)	34	27	5	2	81	22	+59	86	Promoted to Division One
2	Blackpool Rovers (P)	34	25	4	5	84	33	+51	76 (Note: Blackpool Rovers and Oldham Town had 3 points deducted)	Promoted to Division One
3	Bradford Park Avenue (P)	34	20	9	5	72	41	+31	69	Promoted to Division One
4	Bamber Bridge	34	20	6	8	78	46	+32	66	
5	Blackpool Mechanics	34	18	7	9	51	30	+21	61	
6	Newcastle Town	34	16	12	6	48	30	+18	60	
7	Cheadle Town	34	17	3	14	55	54	+1	54	
8	Glossop	34	12	10	12	47	42	+5	46	
9	Burscough	34	12	8	14	39	51	−12	44	
10	Westhoughton Town	34	11	10	13	50	64	−14	43	
11	Castleton Gabriels	34	11	9	14	42	47	−5	42	
12	Chadderton	34	10	6	18	51	61	−10	36	
13	Maghull	34	9	8	17	37	54	−17	35	
14	Kidsgrove Athletic	34	7	10	17	37	65	−28	31	
15	Ashton Town	34	9	2	23	43	86	−43	29	
16	Oldham Town	34	8	4	22	35	66	−31	25	
17	Formby	34	5	9	20	46	63	−17	24	
18	Atherton Collieries	34	6	4	24	37	78	−41	22	

Source: NWCFL: Final Tables, Season 1990/91
Rules for classification: 1) points; 2) goal difference; 3) number of goals scored.
(C) Champions; (P) Promoted

== League Challenge Cup ==
The 1990–91 League Challenge Cup (known as the Raab Karcher Cup for sponsorship reasons) was a knockout competition open to all the league's clubs. The final, played at Bury F.C., was contested by Division One clubs with Vauxhall GM defeating Darwen 2–0.

Semi-finals and Final

The semi-finals were decided on aggregate score from two legs played

Semi-finals
Darwen (D1)	2	3 (Note: After extra time)	5
Maine Road (D1)	0	3	3
Knowsley United (D1)	0	4	4
Vauxhall GM (D1)	3	3	6

Final (Note: Played at Bury F.C.)
Darwen (D1)	0
Vauxhall GM (D1)	2

Club's division appended to team name: (D1)=Division One
sources:

- Semi-finals: "Scares but car men through". Ellesmere Port Pioneer. Chester. 4 April 1991. p. 36.; "Sport in detail: Raab Karcher Cup:". Manchester Evening News. Manchester. 24 April 1991. p. 56.
- Final: "Ten-man victory". Ellesmere Port Pioneer. Chester. 16 May 1991. p. 44.

== Second Division Trophy ==
The 1990–91 Second Division Trophy (known as the Lamot Pils Trophy for sponsorship reasons) was a knockout competition for Division Two clubs only. Up to the quarter-finals the ties were staged over two legs; the semi-finals and final tie were each played as a single match at a neutral venue. In the final, played at Maine Road F.C., Glossop defeated Cheadle Town 2–1.

Semi-finals and Final

The semi-finals and final were played at neutral venues

Semi-finals
Cheadle Town (Note: Played at Leyland Motors F.C.)	3
Blackpool Rovers	2
Atherton Collieries (Note: Played at Ashton United F.C.)	1
Glossop	2

Final (Note: Played at Maine Road F.C.)
Cheadle Town	1
Glossop	2

sources:

- Semi-finals: "(column 5) Glossop 2 Atherton Colls 1". Manchester Evening News. Manchester. 12 March 1991. p. 55. & "Dodd angry as Wren go out". Evening Gazette. Blackpool. 14 March 1991. p. 22.
- Final: "Glossop break cup hoodoo". Manchester Evening News. Manchester. 27 March 1991. p. 67.

== Floodlit Trophy ==
The 1990–91 Floodlit Trophy, a competition that commenced this season, was open to all the league's clubs with floodlights. It was won by Colwyn Bay who defeated Ashton United 1–0 after extra time in the final played at Atherton Laburnum Rovers F.C.

== Reserves Section ==
Main honours for the 1990–91 season:

- Reserves Division
  - Winners: Flixton Reserves
  - Runners-up: Darwen Reserves
- Reserves Division Cup
  - Winners: Flixton Reserves
  - Runners-up: Chadderton Reserves
