= 1988–89 North West Counties Football League =

The 1988–89 North West Counties Football League (known as the Bass North West Counties League for sponsorship reasons) was the seventh in the history of the North West Counties Football League, a football competition in England.

The league comprised two divisions (at levels 8 and 9 of the English football league system) and there was additionally the League Challenge Cup knockout competition (known as the Raab Karcher Cup for sponsorship reasons) open to all the league's clubs and also a reserves team section. From this season onwards an automatic promotion/relegation agreement was in place for the top club from each of this league and the Northern Counties East League to be automatically promoted to the Northern Premier League (subject to their ground meeting the required standard) with relegated clubs to move in the opposite direction.

== Division One ==
North West Counties Football League Division One
- Season: 1988–89
- Teams: 18
- Champions: Rossendale United
- Promoted: Rossendale United
- Relegated: Formby
- Matches: 306
- Goals: 910 (2.97 per match)

Division One featured 18 clubs, 16 remaining from the previous season plus 2 additional (both promoted from Division Two):

- Ashton United, promoted as champions
- Flixton, promoted as runners-up

Kirkby Town changed their name to Knowsley United

Clubs leaving the division at the end of the season were: Rossendale United, the first club to take automatic promotion to the Northern Premier League; Ellesmere Port & Neston who folded and left the league; and Formby who were relegated – they were demoted as their ground was ruled of insufficient standard for Division One.

=== League table ===
| Pos | Team | Pld | W | D | L | GF | GA | GD | Pts | Season End Notes |
|---|---|---|---|---|---|---|---|---|---|---|
| 1 | Rossendale United (C, P) | 34 | 24 | 8 | 2 | 84 | 27 | +57 | 56 | Promoted to Northern Premier League Division One |
| 2 | Knowsley United | 34 | 21 | 8 | 5 | 85 | 43 | +42 | 50 | |
| 3 | St Helens Town | 34 | 20 | 8 | 6 | 60 | 25 | +35 | 48 | |
| 4 | Colwyn Bay | 34 | 19 | 9 | 6 | 77 | 45 | +32 | 47 | |
| 5 | Darwen | 34 | 19 | 9 | 6 | 64 | 36 | +28 | 47 | |
| 6 | Warrington Town | 34 | 16 | 10 | 8 | 47 | 37 | +10 | 42 | |
| 7 | Flixton | 34 | 15 | 8 | 11 | 61 | 44 | +17 | 38 | |
| 8 | Leyland Motors | 34 | 15 | 8 | 11 | 53 | 44 | +9 | 38 | |
| 9 | Bootle | 34 | 14 | 4 | 16 | 49 | 54 | −5 | 32 | |
| 10 | Burscough | 34 | 11 | 10 | 13 | 40 | 51 | −11 | 32 | |
| 11 | Ellesmere Port & Neston | 34 | 9 | 12 | 13 | 36 | 42 | −6 | 30 | Club folded at end of season |
| 12 | Clitheroe | 34 | 8 | 12 | 14 | 38 | 41 | −3 | 28 | |
| 13 | Skelmersdale United | 34 | 8 | 9 | 17 | 39 | 68 | −29 | 25 | |
| 14 | Atherton Laburnum Rovers | 34 | 9 | 6 | 19 | 47 | 74 | −27 | 24 | |
| 15 | Prescot Cables | 34 | 7 | 9 | 18 | 36 | 60 | −24 | 23 | |
| 16 | Salford | 34 | 7 | 8 | 19 | 33 | 70 | −37 | 22 | |
| 17 | Ashton United | 34 | 7 | 6 | 21 | 37 | 72 | −35 | 18 (Note: Ashton United had 2 points deducted) | |
| 18 | Formby (R) | 34 | 3 | 4 | 27 | 24 | 77 | −53 | 10 | Relegated to Division Two |

Source: NWCFL: Final Tables, Season 1988/89
Rules for classification: The points system until the 1989–90 season: 2 points for a win, 1 point for a draw and 0 points for losing.
(C) Champions; (P) Promoted; (R) Relegated

== Division Two ==
North West Counties Football League Division Two
- Season: 1988–89
- Teams: 18
- Champions: Vauxhall GM
- Promoted: Vauxhall GM; Chadderton; Nantwich Town
- Matches: 306
- Goals: 945 (3.09 per match)

Division Two featured 18 clubs, 17 remaining from the previous season plus one additional:

- Glossop, relegated from Division One

At the end of the season in order to maintain 18 clubs in Division One 3 clubs were promoted: the champions Vauxhall GM, Chadderton and Nantwich Town – the latter two, who finished third and fifth in the table, were accepted as their grounds were of sufficient standard for Division One unlike those of the clubs that had finished second and fourth. The champions Vauxhall GM created a Division Two record for fewest goals conceded (17) over the season and with only one league defeat (from 34 matches) equalled the league record of fewest defeats over the season established by Radcliffe Borough (of 1 defeat from 38 matches) in the league's inaugural 1982–83 season).

The bottom two clubs both remained in the division: of those Newton equalled the league record of only one league victory over a season and additionally in conceding 111 goals in 34 matches became the first Division Two club to concede in excess of 100 goals in a season and equalled the league record of Darwen from Division One in 1983–84.

=== League table ===
| Pos | Team | Pld | W | D | L | GF | GA | GD | Pts | Season End Notes |
|---|---|---|---|---|---|---|---|---|---|---|
| 1 | Vauxhall GM (C, P) | 34 | 25 | 8 | 1 | 68 | 17 | +51 | 58 | promoted to Division One |
| 2 | Maine Road | 34 | 22 | 7 | 5 | 96 | 40 | +56 | 51 | Denied promotion (ground grading) |
| 3 | Chadderton (P) | 34 | 20 | 9 | 5 | 71 | 29 | +42 | 49 | promoted to Division One |
| 4 | Wren Rovers | 34 | 19 | 10 | 5 | 77 | 45 | +32 | 48 | Denied promotion (ground grading) |
| 5 | Nantwich Town (P) | 34 | 20 | 4 | 10 | 66 | 28 | +38 | 44 | promoted to Division One |
| 6 | Newcastle Town | 34 | 15 | 10 | 9 | 53 | 37 | +16 | 40 | |
| 7 | Great Harwood Town | 34 | 16 | 6 | 12 | 52 | 40 | +12 | 38 | |
| 8 | Maghull | 34 | 12 | 13 | 9 | 46 | 44 | +2 | 37 | |
| 9 | Bacup Borough | 34 | 11 | 12 | 11 | 55 | 57 | −2 | 34 | |
| 10 | Daisy Hill | 34 | 12 | 6 | 16 | 36 | 49 | −13 | 30 | |
| 11 | Atherton Collieries | 34 | 9 | 11 | 14 | 52 | 58 | −6 | 29 | |
| 12 | Padiham | 34 | 9 | 10 | 15 | 39 | 57 | −18 | 28 | |
| 13 | Glossop | 34 | 10 | 7 | 17 | 42 | 60 | −18 | 27 | |
| 14 | Cheadle Town | 34 | 10 | 7 | 17 | 46 | 67 | −21 | 27 | |
| 15 | Oldham Town | 34 | 6 | 11 | 17 | 46 | 66 | −20 | 23 | |
| 16 | Blackpool Mechanics | 34 | 9 | 5 | 20 | 46 | 72 | −26 | 23 | |
| 17 | Ashton Town | 34 | 4 | 11 | 19 | 31 | 68 | −37 | 19 | |
| 18 | Newton | 34 | 1 | 5 | 28 | 23 | 111 | −88 | 7 | |

Source: NWCFL: Final Tables, Season 1988/89
Rules for classification: The points system until the 1989–90 season: 2 points for a win, 1 point for a draw and 0 points for losing.
(C) Champions; (P) Promoted

== League Challenge Cup ==
The 1988–89 League Challenge Cup (known as the Raab Karcher Cup for sponsorship reasons) was a knockout competition open all the league's clubs. The all Division One club final featured the same clubs as the previous season but with a different outcome as Colwyn Bay defeated Warrington Town 3–0 in the match played at Bury F.C.

Semi-finals and Final

The semi-finals were decided on aggregate score from two legs played

Semi-finals
Salford (D1) | 0 | 0 | 0
Colwyn Bay (D1) | 2 | 3 | 5
Clitheroe (D1) | 0 | 0 | 0
Warrington Town (D1) | 0 | 2 | 2

Final (Note: Played at Bury F.C.)
Colwyn Bay (D1) | 3
Warrington Town (D1) | 0

Club's division appended to team name: (D1)=Division One
sources:

- Semi-finals: Nick Walker (10 April 1989). "Conquering Town set for final fling". Liverpool Echo. Liverpool. p. 32. & "Colwyn Bay 3 Salford 0". Daily Post (Welsh Edition). Liverpool. 10 April 1989. p. 26.
- Final: Nick Walker (5 May 1989). "Rush roars in to floor Warrington". Liverpool Echo. Liverpool. p. 57.

== Reserves Section ==
Main honours for the 1988–89 season:

- Reserves Division (regionalised competition)
  - East Division
    - Winners: Flixton Reserves
    - Runners-up: Maine Road Reserves
  - West Division
    - Winners: Maghull Reserves
    - Runners-up: Skelmersdale United Reserves
- Reserves Division Cup
  - Winners: Rossendale United Reserves
  - Runners-up: Flixton Reserves
