= 1990–91 Northern Premier League =

The 1990–91 Northern Premier League season was the 23rd in the history of the Northern Premier League, a football competition in England. Teams were divided into two divisions; the Premier Division, won by Witton Albion, and the First Division, won by Whitley Bay. It was known as the HFS Loans League for sponsorship reasons.

== Premier Division ==
Northern Premier League Premier Division
- Season: 1990–91
- Champions: Witton Albion
- Promoted: Witton Albion
- Matches: 420
- Goals: 1,265 (3.01 per match)

The Premier Division featured three new teams:

- Chorley relegated from the Football Conference
- Droylsden promoted as runners-up from Division One
- Leek Town promoted as champions from Division One

=== League table ===
Pos	Team	Pld	W	D	L	GF	GA	GD	Pts	Promotion
1	Witton Albion (C, P)	40	28	9	3	81	31	+50	93	Promotion to Football Conference
2	Stalybridge Celtic	40	22	11	7	44	26	+18	77	
3	Morecambe	40	19	16	5	72	44	+28	73	
4	Fleetwood Town	40	20	9	11	69	44	+25	69	
5	Southport	40	18	14	8	66	48	+18	68	
6	Marine	40	18	11	11	56	39	+17	65	
7	Bishop Auckland	40	17	10	13	62	56	+6	61	
8	Buxton	40	17	11	12	66	61	+5	59 (Note: Buxton were docked 3 points.)	
9	Leek Town	40	15	11	14	48	44	+4	56	
10	Frickley Athletic	40	16	6	18	64	62	+2	54	
11	Hyde United	40	14	11	15	73	63	+10	53	
12	Goole Town	40	14	10	16	68	74	−6	52	
13	Droylsden	40	12	11	17	67	70	−3	47	
14	Chorley	40	12	10	18	55	55	0	46	
15	Mossley	40	13	10	17	55	68	−13	45 (Note: Mossley were docked 4 points.)	
16	Horwich RMI	40	13	6	21	62	81	−19	45	
17	Matlock Town	40	12	7	21	52	70	−18	43	
18	Bangor City	40	9	12	19	52	70	−18	39	
19	South Liverpool	40	10	9	21	58	92	−34	39	Club resigned from the league and Folded. Reform in 1992 and merged 1992-1994, and demerged in 1994 until present
20	Gainsborough Trinity	40	9	11	20	57	84	−27	38	
21	Shepshed Charterhouse	40	6	7	27	38	83	−45	25	
22	Colne Dynamoes	0	0	0	0	0	0	0	0 (Note: Colne Dynamoes folded prior to the season's start.)	Club folded

Updated to match(es) played on May 1991. Source: thefootballarchives.com
Rules for classification: 1) points; 2) goal difference; 3) number of goals scored.
(C) Champions; (P) Promoted

=== Results ===
Home \ Away	BAN	BIS	BUX	CHO	DRO	FLE	FRK	GAI	GOO	HOR	HYD	LEE	MAR	MAT	MOR	MOS	CHR	SLI	SOU	STL	WTN
Bangor City	—	0–1	0–2	1–3	1–3	2–4	1–0	0–0	2–3	3–1	1–0	1–1	1–1	1–0	1–2	2–1	1–2	1–1	2–1	0–1	0–1
Bishop Auckland	3–0	—	1–2	1–0	2–1	0–1	1–0	3–1	3–0	1–2	2–0	0–3	0–0	1–1	1–1	1–0	3–1	2–0	3–4	0–1	0–4
Buxton	1–1	2–2	—	4–3	1–1	1–2	2–1	4–3	3–1	5–1	0–0	0–2	0–3	2–1	0–0	1–0	4–0	1–0	0–0	1–1	4–0
Chorley	1–3	1–1	0–1	—	3–0	2–2	1–3	5–3	2–2	1–2	4–0	0–2	1–0	1–0	1–2	2–1	1–1	3–1	1–2	2–0	0–1
Droylsden	2–2	3–4	1–1	0–0	—	1–3	2–2	3–0	4–2	3–1	2–0	1–1	4–0	1–2	0–1	1–2	4–2	3–2	2–2	2–2	1–4
Fleetwood Town	3–1	0–1	0–1	1–0	3–2	—	5–0	2–0	1–1	3–2	4–1	0–0	4–1	1–3	1–1	0–0	1–1	1–2	0–0	3–1	0–2
Frickley Athletic	2–2	0–1	1–2	1–4	5–4	2–0	—	3–1	3–2	0–1	3–1	1–0	0–0	1–2	1–0	2–3	2–3	5–1	1–4	3–1	0–1
Gainsborough Trinity	1–1	2–1	4–4	0–1	0–0	0–4	1–3	—	4–2	4–1	2–3	2–1	2–3	2–4	2–2	4–2	3–2	1–1	1–3	0–0	0–0
Goole Town	4–3	0–3	2–2	2–1	2–0	0–1	4–3	2–2	—	4–1	0–0	4–1	0–1	1–2	0–0	3–1	2–1	3–1	0–1	0–1	1–2
Horwich RMI	4–1	2–2	4–0	1–1	2–1	0–2	1–1	2–1	1–3	—	2–0	0–3	0–0	5–0	1–1	2–4	3–0	2–4	2–2	0–1	1–2
Hyde United	4–5	3–2	5–0	1–0	1–0	1–1	2–0	1–2	1–2	0–3	—	0–2	0–0	5–3	3–1	6–2	7–0	9–1	1–3	1–1	1–1
Leek Town	0–2	0–2	1–0	0–0	2–1	1–2	2–1	4–0	1–1	1–2	1–1	—	2–3	1–0	1–1	3–3	3–1	2–2	1–1	1–0	0–0
Marine	1–1	1–2	0–2	3–1	1–1	1–0	1–3	3–0	2–0	2–1	3–0	4–1	—	2–0	0–1	3–1	3–0	3–1	2–3	0–1	1–1
Matlock Town	2–2	3–1	3–3	3–1	0–1	1–1	1–3	2–3	1–2	2–1	1–3	1–0	1–3	—	1–2	4–0	1–0	1–1	0–0	0–1	1–3
Morecambe	1–1	3–3	2–1	1–1	6–1	3–2	2–1	4–4	5–3	5–2	1–1	3–1	0–0	4–1	—	0–2	3–0	2–1	2–1	0–0	2–0
Mossley	2–0	1–1	3–2	1–1	3–3	2–1	0–0	0–1	2–0	5–3	2–2	1–0	3–2	0–0	1–0	—	1–0	0–2	2–2	0–1	2–4
Shepshed Charterhouse	1–1	4–1	1–0	1–2	0–2	1–4	0–1	1–0	2–2	1–2	1–4	0–1	0–2	0–1	2–3	0–0	—	1–2	2–2	0–2	0–2
South Liverpool	2–1	2–2	1–4	2–2	3–4	2–4	1–4	1–1	2–4	3–0	2–3	0–1	0–1	3–2	0–4	1–0	0–3	—	2–2	2–0	0–2
Southport	3–2	3–1	3–1	2–1	0–2	2–1	0–1	1–0	3–3	2–0	1–1	1–0	0–0	1–0	0–0	4–0	3–1	3–4	—	0–0	0–2
Stalybridge Celtic	3–1	1–0	3–1	2–1	1–0	2–0	0–0	1–0	1–1	3–0	1–0	0–1	1–0	2–0	0–0	1–0	3–1	1–1	2–0	—	1–1
Witton Albion	2–1	3–3	4–1	1–0	1–0	0–1	2–1	4–0	4–0	4–1	1–1	2–0	0–0	5–1	2–1	3–2	1–1	4–1	2–1	3–0	—

Updated to match(es) played on 4 May 1991. Source: Northern Premier Division results grid
Legend: Blue = home team win; Yellow = draw; Red = away team win.

== Division One ==
Northern Premier League Division One
- Season: 1990–91
- Champions: Whitley Bay
- Promoted: Whitley Bay; Emley; Accrington Stanley

Division One featured four new teams:

- Bridlington Town, promoted as champions of the NCEFL Premier Division
- Caernarfon Town and Rhyl, relegated from the NPL Premier Division
- Warrington Town, promoted as champions of the NWCFL Division One

Pos	Team	Pld	W	D	L	GF	GA	GD	Pts	Promotion
1	Whitley Bay (C, P)	42	25	10	7	95	38	+57	85	Promotion to NPL Premier Division
2	Emley (P)	42	24	12	6	78	37	+41	84	Promotion to NPL Premier Division
3	Worksop Town	42	25	7	10	85	56	+29	82	
4	Accrington Stanley (P)	42	21	13	8	83	57	+26	76	Promotion to NPL Premier Division
5	Rhyl	42	21	7	14	62	63	−1	70	
6	Lancaster City	42	19	8	15	58	56	+2	65	
7	Eastwood Town	42	17	11	14	70	60	+10	62	
8	Warrington Town	42	17	10	15	68	52	+16	61	
9	Bridlington Town	42	15	15	12	72	52	+20	60	
10	Curzon Ashton	42	14	14	14	49	57	−8	56	
11	Congleton Town	42	14	12	16	57	71	−14	54	
12	Netherfield	42	14	11	17	67	66	+1	53	
13	Newtown	42	13	12	17	68	75	−7	51	
14	Caernarfon Town	42	13	10	19	51	64	−13	49	
15	Rossendale United	42	12	13	17	66	67	−1	49	
16	Radcliffe Borough	42	12	12	18	50	69	−19	48	
17	Irlam Town	42	12	11	19	55	76	−21	47	
18	Winsford United	42	11	13	18	51	66	−15	46	
19	Harrogate Town	42	11	13	18	55	73	−18	46	
20	Workington	42	11	9	22	49	78	−29	42	
21	Farsley Celtic	42	9	7	26	45	95	−50	34	
22	Alfreton Town	42	7	12	23	41	84	−43	33	

Updated to match(es) played on May 1991. Source:
Rules for classification: 1) points; 2) goal difference; 3) number of goals scored.
(C) Champions; (P) Promoted

== Promotion and relegation ==
In the twenty-third season of the Northern Premier League Witton Albion (as champions) were automatically promoted to the Football Conference. None of the Premier Division sides were relegated, but South Liverpool folded at the end of the season, so three sides were promoted to the Premier Division; First Division winners Whitley Bay, second placed Emley and fourth placed Accrington Stanley. Colwyn Bay, Guiseley and Knowsley United were admitted to take these teams' places.

== Cup results ==
Challenge Cup:

- Southport bt. Buxton

President's Cup:

- Witton Albion bt. Fleetwood Town

Northern Premier League Shield: Between Champions of NPL Premier Division and Winners of the Presidents Cup.

- Witton Albion bt. Stalybridge Celtic ^{1}

^{1 As Witton Albion won both the Northern Premier League and the Presidents cup, Stalybridge Celtic qualified as 2nd placed team of the NPL.}
