= 1989–90 North West Counties Football League =

The 1989–90 North West Counties Football League season (known as the Bass North West Counties League for sponsorship reasons) was the eighth in the history of the North West Counties Football League, a football competition in England.

The league comprised two divisions (at levels 8 and 9 of the English football league system) and there were additionally two cup competitions: the League Challenge Cup knockout competition (known as the Raab Karcher Cup for sponsorship reasons) open to all the league's clubs; and starting this season a new knockout cup competition for Division Two clubs only, the Second Division Trophy (known as the Lamot Pils Trophy for sponsorship reasons). There was also a reserves team section.

From this season the league introduced three points for a league win (from two awarded previously).

== Division One ==
North West Counties Football League Division One
- Season: 1989–90
- Teams: 18
- Champions: Warrington Town
- Promoted: Warrington Town
- Relegated: Burscough; Chadderton
- Matches: 306
- Goals: 877 (2.87 per match)

Division One featured 18 clubs, 15 remaining from the previous season plus 3 additional (all promoted from Division Two):

- Chadderton, promoted from third place
- Nantwich Town, promoted from fifth place
- Vauxhall GM, promoted as champions

At the end of the season the champions Warrington Town were promoted to the Northern Premier League Division One and two clubs, Burscough and Chadderton, were relegated to Division Two.

=== League table ===
Pos	Team	Pld	W	D	L	GF	GA	GD	Pts	Season End Notes
1	Warrington Town (C, P)	34	22	6	6	69	31	+38	72	Promoted to Northern Premier; League Division One
2	Knowsley United	34	21	6	7	68	45	+23	69	
3	Colwyn Bay	34	16	12	6	79	50	+29	60	
4	Vauxhall GM	34	16	9	9	50	42	+8	57	
5	Clitheroe	34	17	6	11	48	47	+1	57	
6	Darwen	34	15	9	10	40	34	+6	54	
7	Nantwich Town	34	13	5	16	50	52	−2	44	
8	St Helens Town	34	10	13	11	50	48	+2	43	
9	Ashton United	34	11	10	13	39	45	−6	43	
10	Prescot Cables	34	10	11	13	49	54	−5	41	
11	Bootle	34	11	8	15	44	58	−14	41	
12	Flixton	34	11	7	16	37	47	−10	40	
13	Leyland Motors	34	10	7	17	55	64	−9	37	
14	Atherton Laburnum Rovers	34	8	13	13	43	58	−15	37	
15	Skelmersdale United	34	8	11	15	48	59	−11	35	
16	Salford	34	8	11	15	31	47	−16	35	
17	Burscough (R)	34	8	12	14	38	41	−3	33 (Note: Burscough had three points deducted)	Relegated to Division Two
18	Chadderton (R)	34	7	12	15	39	55	−16	33	Relegated to Division Two

Source: NWCFL: Final Tables, Season 1989/90
Rules for classification: 1) points; 2) goal difference; 3) number of goals scored.
(C) Champions; (P) Promoted; (R) Relegated

== Division Two ==
North West Counties Football League Division Two
- Season: 1989–90
- Teams: 16
- Champions: Maine Road
- Promoted: Bacup Borough; Maine Road
- Relegated: None
- Matches: 240
- Goals: 774 (3.23 per match)

Division Two featured 16 clubs, 15 remaining from the previous season plus one additional:

- Formby relegated from Division One

Daisy Hill changed their name to Westhoughton Town

At the end of the season the two top clubs, the champions Maine Road and runners-up Bacup Borough were promoted to the Division One. Two clubs Padiham (who joined the West Lancashire League) and Newton (who joined the Warrington & District League) were expelled as their grounds were adjudged below the standard required for the league.

=== League table ===
Pos	Team	Pld	W	D	L	GF	GA	GD	Pts	Season End Notes
1	Maine Road (C, P)	30	22	4	4	84	35	+49	70	promoted to Division One
2	Bacup Borough (P)	30	21	5	4	76	30	+46	68	promoted to Division One
3	Blackpool Mechanics	30	17	6	7	59	30	+29	57	
4	Wren Rovers	30	16	7	7	72	38	+34	55	
5	Great Harwood Town	30	16	6	8	52	29	+23	54	
6	Cheadle Town	30	13	8	9	54	45	+9	47	
7	Maghull	30	13	6	11	40	43	−3	45	
8	Atherton Collieries	30	12	7	11	34	38	−4	43	
9	Oldham Town	30	11	5	14	47	51	−4	38	
10	Ashton Town	30	9	7	14	42	57	−15	34	
11	Padiham	30	9	6	15	44	53	−9	33	Expelled (ground substandard)
12	Formby	30	7	7	16	33	57	−24	28	
13	Newcastle Town	30	8	4	18	38	65	−27	28	
14	Glossop	30	8	3	19	34	58	−24	27	
15	Westhoughton Town	30	8	3	19	36	62	−26	27	
16	Newton	30	5	6	19	29	83	−54	21	Expelled (ground substandard)

Source: NWCFL: Final Tables, Season 1989/90
Rules for classification: 1) points; 2) goal difference; 3) number of goals scored.
(C) Champions; (P) Promoted

== League Challenge Cup ==
The 1989–90 League Challenge Cup (known as the Raab Karcher Cup for sponsorship reasons) was a knockout competition open all the league's clubs. The final was contested at Bury F.C. by the two top Division One clubs with Knowsley United winning 5–4 on penalties after the match finished 2–2 after extra time (1–1 at 90 minutes) thus denying Warrington Town (making their fourth appearance in the final in five seasons) a league and cup double.

Semi-finals and Final

The semi-finals were decided on aggregate score from two legs played

Semi-finals
Maghull (D1)	0	1	1
Knowsley United (D1)	2	5	7
Warrington Town (D1)	1	5	6
Leyland Motors (D1)	0	1	1

Final (Note: Played at Bury F.C.)
Knowsley United (D1)	2 (Note: After extra time, score at 90 minutes 1–1)	5p (Note: Penalties)
Warrington Town (D1)	2	4p

Club's division appended to team name: (D1)=Division One
sources:

- Semi-finals: Tim Chalmers (9 April 1990). "Dream double tonic: Raab Karcher Cup semi-finals, second leg". Manchester Evening News. Manchester. p. 45.
- Final: "Spot on Knowsley". Manchester Evening News. Manchester. 27 April 1990. p. 79.

== Second Division Trophy ==
The 1989–90 Second Division Trophy (known as the Lamot Pils Trophy for sponsorship reasons) was a new competition this season for Division Two clubs only: it was initially arranged in groups with eight qualifiers passing to the knockout stages. The final, played at Leyland Motors F.C., was won by Great Harwood Town who defeated Bacup Borough 2–1.

Semi-finals and Final

The semi-finals and final were played at neutral venues

Semi-finals
Bacup Borough (Note: Played at Burscough F.C.)	5
Cheadle Town	2
Great Harwood Town (Note: Played at St Helens Town F.C.)	2
Ashton Town	0

Final (Note: Played at Leyland Motors F.C.)
Bacup Borough	1
Great Harwood Town	2

sources:

- Semi-finals: "Final date". Rossendale Free Press. Rochdale. 10 March 1990. p. 49. & "Final opponents". Rossendale Free Press. Rochdale. 17 March 1990. p. 53.
- Final: "Injury-time sickener". Rossendale Free Press. Rochdale. 31 March 1990. p. 52.

== Reserves Section ==
Main honours for the 1989–90 season:

- Reserves Division (regionalised competition)
  - East Division
    - Winners: Flixton Reserves
    - Runners-up: Salford Reserves
  - West Division
    - Winners: Warrington Town Reserves
    - Runners-up: Skelmersdale United Reserves
- Reserves Division Cup
  - Winners: Great Harwood Town Reserves
  - Runners-up: Flixton Reserves
