= Newton F.C. =

Newton
- Full name: Newton Football Club

Newton Football Club was a football club based in Newton-le-Willows in Merseyside, England.

== History ==
Newton joined the Mid-Cheshire League in 1973. When the league was split into divisions in 1975 the club was placed in Division One. In 1977–78 they entered the FA Vase for the first time, beating North Withington and Old Blackburnians before losing to Leeds & Carnegie Polytechnic in the second round. Although the club entered the Vase on four more occasions, they did not win another match in the competition.

In 1979 the club was renamed H B & H Newton, but returned to their original name in 1982. They were founder members of the North West Counties League at the start of the 1982–83 season, and were placed in Division Three. In 1987 Division Three was disbanded and its clubs joined Division Two. After finishing bottom of Division Two in 1988–89 and 1989–90, the club left the league. They dropped into the Warrington & District League, where they played for a few seasons before folding.

== Records ==
- Best FA Vase performance: Second round, 1977–78
