= Herbert Wilcox (footballer) =

English footballer

Personal information
- Place of birth: England
- Position: Defender

Senior career*
Years	Team	Apps	(Gls)
1906–1907	Bury	0	(0)
1907–1909	Burnley	3	(0)
- Chorley
- Rossendale United
- * Club domestic league appearances and goals

Herbert Wilcox was an English professional footballer who played as a left back in the Football League for Burnley.
