= John Whittle (footballer) =

English footballer

John Thomas Whittle (29 June 1910 – 31 July 1987) was an English footballer. His regular position was as a forward. He was born in Leigh, Lancashire. He played for Manchester United and Rossendale United.
