= 1991–92 Northern Premier League =

The 1991–92 Northern Premier League season was the 24th in the history of the Northern Premier League, a football competition in England. Teams were divided into two divisions; the Premier Division, won by Stalybridge Celtic, and the First Division, won by Colwyn Bay. It was known as the HFS Loans League for sponsorship reasons.

== Premier Division ==
Northern Premier League Premier Division
- Season: 1991–92
- Champions: Stalybridge Celtic
- Promoted: Stalybridge Celtic
- Relegated: Shepshed Albion
- Matches: 462
- Goals: 1,324 (2.87 per match)

The Premier Division featured three new teams:

- Whitley Bay promoted as champions from Division One
- Emley promoted as runners-up from Division One
- Accrington Stanley promoted as 4th-place finishers from Division One

The Shepshed Charterhouse Renamed to Shepshed Albion in the next season.

=== League table ===
Pos	Team	Pld	W	D	L	GF	GA	GD	Pts	Promotion or relegation
1	Stalybridge Celtic (C, P)	42	26	14	2	84	33	+51	92	Promotion to Football Conference
2	Marine	42	23	9	10	64	32	+32	78	
3	Morecambe	42	21	13	8	70	44	+26	76	
4	Leek Town	42	21	10	11	62	49	+13	73	
5	Buxton	42	21	9	12	65	47	+18	72	
6	Emley	42	18	11	13	69	47	+22	65	
7	Southport	42	16	17	9	57	48	+9	65	
8	Accrington Stanley	42	17	12	13	78	62	+16	63	
9	Hyde United	42	17	9	16	69	67	+2	60	
10	Fleetwood Town	42	17	8	17	67	64	+3	59	
11	Bishop Auckland	42	16	9	17	48	58	−10	57	
12	Goole Town	42	15	9	18	60	72	−12	54	
13	Horwich RMI	42	13	14	15	44	52	−8	53	
14	Frickley Athletic	42	12	16	14	61	57	+4	52	
15	Droylsden	42	12	14	16	62	72	−10	50	
16	Mossley	42	15	4	23	51	73	−22	49	
17	Whitley Bay	42	13	9	20	53	79	−26	48	
18	Gainsborough Trinity	42	11	13	18	48	63	−15	46	
19	Matlock Town	42	12	9	21	59	87	−28	45	
20	Bangor City	42	11	10	21	46	57	−11	43	Transferred to the League of Wales
21	Chorley	42	11	9	22	61	82	−21	42	
22	Shepshed Charterhouse (R)	42	6	8	28	46	79	−33	26	Relegation to NPL Division One

Updated to match(es) played on May 1992. Source: nonleaguefooty.co.uk
Rules for classification: 1) points; 2) goal difference; 3) number of goals scored.
(C) Champions; (P) Promoted; (R) Relegated

=== Results ===
Home \ Away	ACC	BAN	BIS	BUX	CHO	DRO	EML	FLE	FRK	GAI	GOO	HOR	HYD	LEE	MAR	MAT	MOR	MOS	SPD	SOU	STL	WHI
Accrington Stanley	—	1–0	2–2	1–1	3–2	2–2	2–1	3–0	1–2	1–1	4–0	1–1	1–1	1–0	0–3	2–2	3–1	5–1	3–1	1–1	0–3	3–2
Bangor City	4–3	—	1–1	0–1	1–1	4–0	2–0	0–2	2–1	1–3	2–0	1–2	2–2	0–1	0–2	2–3	0–1	4–0	1–0	1–1	0–1	1–2
Bishop Auckland	0–6	0–0	—	2–0	3–0	1–0	1–1	3–0	1–0	3–1	1–2	1–3	0–1	0–2	3–0	1–1	0–2	1–2	4–1	0–1	1–4	1–1
Buxton	0–1	2–0	2–1	—	4–2	2–0	1–3	1–0	3–0	2–1	1–1	5–0	2–0	3–0	0–3	3–1	1–3	1–3	1–0	1–0	1–2	3–1
Chorley	2–1	4–3	1–0	0–2	—	1–2	0–1	1–0	2–2	3–1	4–4	0–0	2–0	0–2	3–1	2–1	1–2	1–2	1–2	2–2	2–3	1–3
Droylsden	3–2	2–0	1–2	0–0	2–0	—	4–0	1–4	4–2	0–0	3–2	5–1	3–2	2–2	1–1	2–2	0–1	1–4	3–2	1–1	2–2	1–1
Emley	3–1	0–2	4–1	1–2	5–0	1–2	—	4–0	2–0	6–0	2–0	0–0	0–0	0–0	0–1	4–0	3–3	2–1	0–0	3–2	2–2	3–1
Fleetwood Town	2–1	2–1	3–4	1–1	5–0	2–1	1–1	—	2–1	0–1	2–3	1–2	5–1	2–2	0–0	4–0	1–1	3–1	2–0	5–1	0–2	5–0
Frickley Athletic	1–1	2–1	2–0	1–1	1–0	1–1	0–0	3–2	—	0–0	1–2	0–2	3–0	0–1	0–4	2–2	1–1	3–0	6–1	2–0	1–1	4–0
Gainsborough Trinity	0–4	1–1	0–1	0–0	3–1	0–0	1–0	1–1	1–1	—	0–2	4–0	1–0	1–2	0–0	0–1	5–1	0–1	3–1	0–2	3–1	1–3
Goole Town	2–4	2–1	1–2	2–2	3–1	2–2	0–1	2–1	2–2	4–1	—	1–0	0–1	1–2	1–2	3–0	1–2	3–1	0–1	2–1	1–1	1–0
Horwich RMI	1–1	0–1	2–0	0–0	2–2	1–0	3–0	0–1	1–3	3–0	2–1	—	0–2	1–1	1–0	2–1	0–3	1–2	0–0	1–1	0–0	1–2
Hyde United	2–1	2–2	4–0	2–1	1–2	3–1	5–3	7–0	1–1	2–1	1–3	1–1	—	1–0	0–4	3–2	2–2	4–1	3–1	4–0	1–2	0–1
Leek Town	1–0	0–0	1–1	4–1	2–0	2–0	1–1	0–3	2–1	0–1	1–1	3–1	3–3	—	3–2	2–1	0–4	3–2	3–0	3–0	2–3	2–0
Marine	0–1	1–0	0–1	2–0	2–1	3–1	2–0	5–0	1–0	2–1	2–0	2–1	2–0	3–0	—	1–3	0–1	2–1	1–1	1–1	0–0	3–0
Matlock Town	0–4	2–0	0–1	0–2	2–2	3–2	0–3	1–1	1–1	1–3	4–1	1–0	2–1	3–0	0–1	—	1–2	0–2	4–3	3–3	0–3	5–3
Morecambe	4–1	3–0	3–0	2–1	2–1	1–1	0–1	1–2	2–0	1–1	1–1	0–0	3–0	2–2	2–1	3–3	—	1–0	0–2	0–1	0–0	0–1
Mossley	0–1	1–3	0–2	1–3	1–0	3–0	0–3	4–1	1–1	2–1	3–1	1–1	1–1	1–2	0–1	0–1	1–4	—	2–1	0–0	0–1	3–2
Shepshed Albion	4–0	0–0	0–0	2–3	2–3	2–3	3–2	0–1	1–3	1–1	0–1	1–3	1–2	1–2	0–0	4–1	2–4	0–1	—	0–1	3–3	0–1
Southport	2–2	4–0	3–0	2–1	1–1	2–2	2–3	1–0	3–2	2–2	1–1	1–1	2–0	1–0	0–0	2–0	1–1	1–0	3–0	—	0–0	2–0
Stalybridge Celtic	2–1	1–1	0–0	2–2	3–3	2–0	1–0	2–0	2–2	3–0	7–0	2–0	1–2	1–0	3–1	4–0	1–0	5–0	2–1	1–0	—	3–1
Whitley Bay	2–2	0–1	0–2	0–2	0–6	3–1	0–0	0–0	2–2	3–3	2–0	1–3	4–1	0–3	2–2	3–1	1–1	2–1	2–1	1–2	0–2	—

Updated to match(es) played on 2 May 1992. Source: Northern Premier Division results grid
Legend: Blue = home team win; Yellow = draw; Red = away team win.

== Division One ==
Northern Premier League Division One
- Season: 1991–92
- Champions: Colwyn Bay
- Promoted: Colwyn Bay; Winsford United
- Relegated: Newtown; Rhyl; Irlam Town
- Matches: 462
- Goals: 1,551 (3.36 per match)

Division One featured three new teams:

- Colwyn Bay promoted as runners-up of the NWCFL Division One
- Guiseley promoted as champions of the NCEFL Premier Division
- Knowsley United promoted as champions of the NWCFL Division One

=== League table ===
Pos	Team	Pld	W	D	L	GF	GA	GD	Pts	Promotion or relegation
1	Colwyn Bay (C, P)	42	30	4	8	99	49	+50	94	Promotion to Premier Division
2	Winsford United (P)	42	29	6	7	96	41	+55	93	Promotion to Premier Division
3	Worksop Town	42	25	5	12	101	51	+50	80	
4	Guiseley	42	22	12	8	93	56	+37	78	
5	Caernarfon Town	42	23	9	10	78	47	+31	78	
6	Bridlington Town	42	22	9	11	86	46	+40	75	
7	Warrington Town	42	20	8	14	79	64	+15	68	
8	Knowsley United	42	18	10	14	69	52	+17	64	
9	Netherfield	42	18	7	17	54	61	−7	61	
10	Harrogate Town	42	14	16	12	73	69	+4	58	
11	Curzon Ashton	42	15	9	18	71	83	−12	54	
12	Farsley Celtic	42	15	9	18	79	101	−22	53 (Note: Farsley Celtic, Irlam Town and Workington were docked 1 point.)	
13	Radcliffe Borough	42	15	9	18	67	72	−5	51 (Note: Radcliffe Borough were docked 3 points.)	
14	Newtown	42	15	6	21	60	95	−35	51	Transferred to the League of Wales
15	Eastwood Town	42	13	11	18	59	70	−11	50	
16	Lancaster City	42	10	19	13	55	62	−7	49	
17	Congleton Town	42	14	5	23	59	81	−22	47	
18	Rhyl	42	11	10	21	59	69	−10	43	Transferred to the Cymru Alliance
19	Rossendale United	42	9	11	22	61	90	−29	38	
20	Alfreton Town	42	12	2	28	63	98	−35	38	
21	Irlam Town (R)	42	9	7	26	45	95	−50	33	Relegation to NWCFL Division Two
22	Workington	42	7	8	27	45	99	−54	28	

Updated to match(es) played on May 1992. Source:
Rules for classification: 1) points; 2) goal difference; 3) number of goals scored.
(C) Champions; (P) Promoted; (R) Relegated

== Promotion and relegation ==
In the twenty-fourth season of the Northern Premier League Stalybridge Celtic (as champions) were automatically promoted to the Football Conference. Shepshed Albion were relegated to the First Division and Bangor City moved to the newly formed League of Wales; these three clubs were replaced by relegated Conference side Barrow, First Division winners Colwyn Bay and second placed Winsford United. In the First Division Newtown and Rhyl left the League to join the League of Wales and Irlam Town left the League altogether; these three sides were replaced by newly admitted Ashton United, Gretna and Great Harwood Town.

== Cup Results ==
Challenge Cup:

- Marine 1–0 Frickley Athletic

President's Cup:

- Morecambe bt. Stalybridge Celtic

Northern Premier League Shield: Between Champions of NPL Premier Division and Winners of the Presidents Cup.

- Stalybridge Celtic bt. Morecambe
