= Brent Peters =

English football manager

Personal information
- Date of birth: 19 November 1957
- Place of birth: England

Managerial career
- Years: Team
- 1990–1991: Glossop North End
- 1993–1994: Rossendale United
- 1996–1997: Accrington Stanley (director of football)
- 1997–1997: Doncaster Rovers (assistant manager)
- 1997–Present: Bacup Borough

Brent Peters is an English football manager who manages Bacup Borough.

== Early life ==
Peters was a football ball boy as a child. He is the son of former Rossendale United director Kenneth Peters.

== Career ==
In 1997, Peters became the manager for Bacup Borough.

In 1990, Peters was appointed manager of Glossop North End.

In 1991, Peters worked at Bury FC as a youth coach and as a chief scout.

In 1993, Peters was appointed manager of his hometown club Rossendale United.

In September 1994, Peters returned to Bury FC as a youth coach.

In February 1996, Peters was appointed Director of football at Accrington Stanley.

In November 1996, Peters left the club after becoming frustrated and wanting a return to football management.

In February 1997, Peters was appointed Assistant Manager at Doncaster Rovers working under Kerry Dixon.

In 1997, Peters was appointed manager of English side Bacup Borough. He became the longest-serving football manager worldwide. He has also worked as the club's driver, repairman, and groundsman. He helped the club win the league. He has been nicknamed "Mister Non-League".

== Personal life ==
Peters has been married. He has a daughter. He has been honored by the Borough of Rossendale council.
