= 1989–90 Northern Premier League =

The 1989–90 Northern Premier League season was the 22nd in the history of the Northern Premier League, a football competition in England. Teams were divided into two divisions: the Premier and the First. It was known as the HFS Loans League for sponsorship reasons.

== Premier Division ==
Northern Premier League Premier Division
- Season: 1989–90
- Champions: Colne Dynamoes
- Promoted: Gateshead
- Relegated: Caernarfon Town; Rhyl
- Matches: 462
- Goals: 1,391 (3.01 per match)

The Premier Division featured two new teams:

- Colne Dynamoes promoted as champions from Division One
- Bishop Auckland promoted as runners up from Division One

=== League table ===
Pos	Team	Pld	W	D	L	GF	GA	GD	Pts	Qualification or relegation
1	Colne Dynamoes (C)	42	32	6	4	86	40	+46	102	
2	Gateshead (P)	42	22	10	10	78	58	+20	76	Promoted to Football Conference
3	Witton Albion	42	22	7	13	67	39	+28	73	
4	Hyde United	42	21	8	13	73	50	+23	71	
5	South Liverpool	42	20	9	13	89	79	+10	69	
6	Matlock Town	42	18	12	12	61	42	+19	66	
7	Southport	42	17	14	11	54	48	+6	65	
8	Fleetwood Town	42	17	12	13	73	66	+7	63	
9	Marine	42	16	14	12	59	55	+4	62	
10	Bangor City	42	15	15	12	64	58	+6	60	
11	Bishop Auckland	42	17	8	17	72	64	+8	59	
12	Gainsborough Trinity	42	16	8	18	59	55	+4	56	
13	Frickley Athletic	42	16	8	18	56	61	−5	56	
14	Horwich RMI	42	15	13	14	66	69	−3	55 (Note: Horwich RMI had 3 points deducted.)	
15	Morecambe	42	15	9	18	58	70	−12	54	
16	Buxton	42	15	8	19	59	72	−13	53	
17	Stalybridge Celtic	42	12	9	21	48	61	−13	45	
18	Mossley	42	11	10	21	61	82	−21	43	
19	Goole Town	42	12	5	25	54	77	−23	41	
20	Shepshed Charterhouse	42	11	7	24	55	82	−27	40	
21	Caernarfon Town (R)	42	10	8	24	56	86	−30	38	Relegated to Division One
22	Rhyl (R)	42	7	10	25	43	77	−34	30 (Note: Rhyl had 1 point deducted.)	Relegated to Division One

(C) Champions; (P) Promoted; (R) Relegated

=== Results ===
Home \ Away	BAN	BIS	BUX	CNR	CHO	FLE	FRK	GAI	GAT	GOO	HOR	HYD	MAR	MAT	MOR	MOS	RHL	CHR	SLI	SOU	STL	WTN
Bangor City		5–0	1–1	3–0	0–1	0–0	2–2	1–1	2–1	1–4	1–2	2–1	3–0	0–0	1–1	1–0	4–3	2–1	2–1	2–2	3–1	2–0
Bishop Auckland	6–2		4–1	3–1	0–2	2–1	3–0	1–2	2–2	1–2	5–0	3–3	1–2	2–2	1–0	1–2	1–2	5–2	1–5	1–1	2–0	1–2
Buxton	2–2	3–0		1–1	0–0	1–3	1–0	2–1	0–4	1–0	2–0	1–2	1–4	1–0	4–0	0–3	3–0	1–1	3–3	0–1	2–1	2–2
Caernarfon Town	1–2	0–2	3–1		1–2	0–4	1–3	1–2	1–1	0–0	1–0	1–1	0–2	0–0	3–0	3–3	3–1	3–0	2–3	0–1	0–1	1–1
Colne Dynamoes	2–1	2–2	2–0	1–0		2–2	2–1	1–2	2–1	2–1	4–2	1–3	3–1	1–0	3–1	3–2	2–1	2–1	6–1	1–0	1–0	3–2
Fleetwood Town	2–0	0–2	0–3	4–3	1–1		1–3	4–1	0–2	2–1	2–2	3–2	0–0	3–3	1–2	2–1	4–2	1–0	6–0	1–1	1–0	1–6
Frickley Athletic	1–1	2–1	4–3	0–2	1–3	0–1		3–1	0–1	2–4	2–0	1–1	1–1	2–1	1–0	1–3	3–1	2–0	2–2	1–2	1–0	2–1
Gainsborough Trinity	4–2	1–0	3–0	4–1	0–1	0–0	0–1		1–0	1–0	1–1	3–1	1–0	1–3	1–1	2–0	1–2	0–1	5–1	1–0	3–3	1–2
Gateshead	2–1	1–0	3–1	2–1	3–2	1–3	1–0	2–1		2–2	3–2	2–1	0–1	1–1	5–1	4–2	1–1	3–1	0–2	3–3	2–1	0–1
Goole Town	0–2	1–3	1–3	1–2	1–5	2–4	0–2	2–1	1–0		1–1	1–2	1–3	3–0	0–5	7–2	1–2	1–3	2–1	0–1	0–2	0–2
Horwich RMI	2–2	1–2	1–1	5–1	1–3	3–2	2–2	1–1	4–1	1–0		0–2	1–3	2–0	1–0	2–3	1–1	1–2	2–2	5–4	1–1	1–0
Hyde United	1–0	1–2	1–0	3–0	2–2	3–1	2–1	2–1	4–0	6–0	2–3		1–1	0–2	0–2	0–1	3–1	4–2	4–3	0–1	2–1	2–0
Marine	3–3	0–0	3–1	3–2	1–0	1–1	2–0	2–1	2–3	0–3	1–1	1–0		1–1	2–0	1–1	3–1	1–1	2–2	1–3	1–1	0–2
Matlock Town	3–0	3–1	1–0	3–0	0–2	2–0	0–2	0–1	1–1	0–0	3–3	2–0	2–1		2–0	2–1	1–0	5–1	1–2	1–2	2–0	5–0
Morecambe	2–1	2–2	4–0	4–4	1–3	2–2	1–0	2–1	1–3	2–1	1–2	0–0	1–1	2–0		0–2	3–1	1–2	2–0	3–2	2–1	3–2
Mossley	1–1	1–3	1–3	2–4	1–3	1–1	1–1	0–3	2–2	1–1	1–2	1–3	1–3	0–3	2–0		2–2	1–1	3–3	3–1	0–1	2–1
Rhyl	0–1	0–0	1–3	1–2	0–2	1–0	1–1	1–1	1–2	0–2	1–2	2–0	2–3	1–1	4–1	3–1		0–4	1–5	1–1	0–0	0–1
Shepshed Charterhouse	1–3	0–1	1–3	4–2	0–2	2–1	2–0	2–1	1–5	3–1	0–2	0–2	2–2	0–1	2–2	1–2	3–0		1–2	0–0	2–2	1–2
South Liverpool	2–1	3–1	2–3	4–2	1–2	1–3	5–3	3–2	1–3	3–2	1–1	0–1	2–0	1–1	4–1	2–0	2–1	4–2		1–1	0–1	1–1
Southport	1–1	2–1	1–0	4–0	0–0	0–0	2–0	2–0	2–2	1–3	2–1	0–0	1–0	1–1	0–1	2–4	1–0	2–0	1–3		2–0	0–0
Stalybridge Celtic	0–0	1–3	4–1	2–3	2–3	4–5	2–0	2–0	2–2	2–0	0–1	0–3	2–0	1–2	1–1	1–0	0–0	2–3	1–3	1–0		1–0
Witton Albion	0–0	1–0	3–0	2–0	0–1	3–0	3–0	1–1	0–1	0–1	2–0	2–2	2–0	2–0	2–0	2–1	2–0	3–1	0–2	5–0	4–0	

Updated to match(es) played on 5 May 1990. Source: Northern Premier Division results grid
Legend: Blue = home team win; Yellow = draw; Red = away team win.

== Division One ==
Northern Premier League Division One
- Season: 1989–90
- Champions: Leek Town
- Promoted: Leek Town; Droylsden
- Relegated: Eastwood Hanley; Penrith
- Matches: 462
- Goals: 1,408 (3.05 per match)

The Division One featured three new teams:

- Worksop Town relegated from Premier Division
- Rossendale United promoted as champions of the NWCFL Division One
- Emley promoted as champions of the NCEL Premier Division

=== League table ===
Pos	Team	Pld	W	D	L	GF	GA	GD	Pts	Qualification or relegation
1	Leek Town (C, P)	42	26	8	8	70	31	+39	86	Promoted to Premier Division
2	Droylsden (P)	42	27	6	9	81	46	+35	80 (Note: Droylsden were docked 7 points.)	Promoted to Premier Division
3	Accrington Stanley	42	22	10	10	80	53	+27	76	
4	Whitley Bay	42	21	11	10	93	59	+34	74	
5	Emley	42	20	9	13	70	42	+28	69	
6	Congleton Town	42	20	12	10	65	53	+12	69 (Note: Congleton Town were docked 3 points.)	
7	Winsford United	42	18	10	14	65	53	+12	64	
8	Curzon Ashton	42	17	11	14	66	60	+6	62	
9	Harrogate Town	42	17	9	16	68	62	+6	60	
10	Lancaster City	42	15	14	13	73	54	+19	59	
11	Eastwood Town	42	16	11	15	61	64	−3	59	
12	Farsley Celtic	42	17	6	19	71	76	−5	57	
13	Rossendale United	42	15	9	18	73	69	+4	54	
14	Newtown	42	14	12	16	49	62	−13	54	
15	Irlam Town	42	14	11	17	61	66	−5	53	
16	Workington	42	14	8	20	56	64	−8	50	
17	Radcliffe Borough	42	14	7	21	47	62	−15	49	
18	Alfreton Town	42	13	8	21	59	85	−26	47	
19	Worksop Town	42	13	5	24	56	95	−39	44	
20	Netherfield	42	11	6	25	56	89	−33	39	
21	Eastwood Hanley (R)	42	10	6	26	45	76	−31	36	Relegated to NWCFL Division One
22	Penrith (R)	42	9	9	24	44	88	−44	36	Relegated to NWCFL Division One

(C) Champions; (P) Promoted; (R) Relegated

== Promotion and relegation ==
In the twenty-second season of the Northern Premier League Colne Dynamoes should have been promoted as champions, but folded at the end of the season, so 2nd placed Gateshead took their place in the Football Conference while relegated Chorley took Gateshead's place. Meanwhile, Caernarfon Town and Rhyl were relegated; these two sides were replaced by First Division winners Leek Town and second placed Droylsden. Eastwood Hanley and Penrith left the First Division at the end of the season and were replaced by newly admitted Bridlington Town and Warrington Town.

== Cup Results ==
Challenge Cup:

- Hyde United 1–0 Gateshead

President's Cup:

- Fleetwood Town bt. Witton Albion

Northern Premier League Shield: Between Champions of NPL Division One and Winners of the NPL Cup.

- Leek Town bt. Hyde United
