= John Keegan (footballer) =

English footballer (born 1981)

Personal information
- Full name: John Kevin Paul Keegan
- Date of birth: 5 August 1981 (age 45)
- Place of birth: Liverpool, England
- Height: 5 ft 11 in (1.80 m)
- Position: Full-back

Youth career
- –1999: York City

Senior career*
Years	Team	Apps	(Gls)
1999–2000	York City	3	(0)
2000–2002	Scarborough	7	(0)
2002–?	Rossendale United		
Total		10	(0)
- * Club domestic league appearances and goals

John Kevin Paul Keegan (born 5 August 1981) is an English former professional footballer who played as a full-back in the Football League for York City, and in non-League football for Scarborough and Rossendale United.
