= Vauxhall Motors F.C. =

English football club

Coordinates: 53°17′46.683″N 2°56′24.5826″W

Vauxhall Motors
- Full name: Vauxhall Motors Football Club
- Nickname: The Motormen
- Founded: 1963; 63 years ago
- Ground: Premier Jet Stadium
- Capacity: 3,300 (350 seated)
- Owner: Vauxhall Motors
- Chairman: Jon Waring
- Manager: Vacant
- League: Northern Premier League Division One West
- 2025–26: Northern Premier League Division One West, 7th of 22
Home colours	Away colours

Vauxhall Motors Football Club is a football club based in Ellesmere Port, Cheshire, England. The club are currently members of the Northern Premier League Division One West and play at the Premier Jet Stadium.

It was originally the works team of the Vauxhall Ellesmere Port Car Plant. It had much success in its local leagues and fought its way up to semi-professional status. It was announced in March 2014 that the club had tendered its resignation from the Football Conference, with effect from the end of season 2013–14. The club took over their reserve team's place back in the West Cheshire League Division One for the 2014–15 season but has since reached the Northern Premier League Division One West.

It is generally regarded as the local team of Ellesmere Port, although two other teams, Ellesmere Port and Ellesmere Port Town, play further down the pyramid in the Chester & District League.

== History ==
Vauxhall Motors F.C. was founded in 1963, shortly after the opening of the new Vauxhall Motors Car Plant in Ellesmere Port, Cheshire. Early in its history, it played in the Ellesmere Port League and the Wirral Combination, but it soon grew too strong for those leagues. By 1970, the club had achieved several promotions and played on the company-owned Hooton Park. By 1987 however, it had opened its own ground, Rivacre Park, where the club plays today. The opening of the new ground was especially important as then England manager Bobby Robson brought a number of former international stars for the opening game.

On the pitch, the club also started finding some success, winning its first West Cheshire League championship in the 1985–86 season. Soon after, they reached their first Cheshire Amateur Cup and triumphed in the Wirral Senior Cup. These accomplishments did not go unnoticed, as the club successfully applied to join the North West Counties League for 1987–88. They easily won the league's Second Division in their second season at that level, and finished fourth in the First Division in 1989–90. Despite expectations to challenge for the league title the next season, the team only finished fifth, but won the North West Counties League Cup in the process, defeating Darwen 2–0.

Soon after its fifth-place finish, the board took the decision to move back down to the West Cheshire League where the club finished in third place in the two following seasons. However, in 1994–95, the club won both divisions of the league – only the third time any club had achieved that in the 103-year history of the league. Soon after, they were accepted back into the North West Counties League. Just as before, they easily won the Second Division of the NWCL, but did not have the best of seasons in Division One, although they did reach the semi-final of the Cheshire Senior Cup. It continued to play in Division One, and reached the final of the NWCL Cup, losing to Kidsgrove Athletic in a closely contested match.

The 1998–99 season was the team's best by far to that point, reaching the fifth round of the FA Vase and earning its best ever league position in third place, and won the NWCL Cup. However, the next season was even better, with the team reaching the semi-finals of the FA Vase and winning the NWCL title, thus earning a spot in Division One of the Northern Premier League. The reserves also enjoyed a successful season, winning a number of smaller trophies.

The club enjoyed considerable success in the Northern Premier League as well, earning promotion to the Northern Premier League Premier Division in their first season, and finishing in second place in the league. The team continued to play well, with its high point coming when they defeated Queens Park Rangers in their first appearance in the FA Cup first round, before losing in the next round in a televised match against Macclesfield Town. The season after, the club hired manager Owen Brown and they earned promotion to Conference North when that league was founded in 2004.

The club finished twenty-first in the 2007–08 season, and were due to be relegated but after Nuneaton Borough's liquidation and the Conference's decision to expel Boston United, the club were reprieved. In the 2009–10 season, the club finished twentieth. However, because of the earlier resignation of Farsley Celtic and the subsequent relegation of Northwich Victoria following financial troubles, Vauxhall Motors was again given a reprieve from relegation.

In the 2010–11 season, they again qualified for the first round proper of the FA Cup, but were unable to repeat the success of eight years previously, although Josh Wilson scored in the 38th minute, his header was disallowed, drawing 0–0 against Hartlepool United before going on to lose 1–0 in the replay. On 26 May 2011 it was announced that, because of a promotion at work, Carl Macauley was stepping down from his role as manager and that his assistant Anthony Wright would be taking over the reins with former Notts County, Peterborough United, Burscough and Vauxhall Motors striker Gary Martindale as his number two. However results didn't go as hoped despite assembling one of the strongest squads the club had seen, resulting in Carl Macauley making a shock return to the Rivacre Park hotseat in November 2011 with Anthony Wright reverting to Assistant Manager and Gary Martindale to First Team Coach.

In March 2014 the club announced its intention to withdraw from the Conference North because of "ever-increasing costs" leaving the club with no alternative but to return to the West Cheshire League to stabilise and rebuild once again for the future. A week after the announcement long-serving manager Carl Macauley left to become Assistant Manager to Steve Burr at Chester F.C., leaving Anthony Wright and Gary Martindale in charge once again until the end of the season.

Only four of the founder members of Conference North remained in the league for its first ten seasons: Gainsborough Trinity, Harrogate Town, Stalybridge Celtic and Vauxhall Motors. Vauxhall's league positions in those season's were 15th, 18th, 15th, 21st, 11th, 20th, 17th, 18th, 12th and 18th. On 26 April 2014 Motors played their last game in Conference North for the foreseeable future losing 2–0 at home to Solihull Moors.

In May 2014 former Vauxhall favourite Alan Schumacker was appointed as first team manager. The former Motors defender was a member of Alvin McDonald's all conquering North West Counties League championship side and had been reserve team manager since the summer of 2010. He appointed Kevin Baker as his assistant and Steve Foulkes as coach for the coming season.

At the end of the 2015–16 season manager Alan Schumacker and his assistant Kevin Baker left the club and were replaced by former Motors’ assistant manager Anthony Wright and former Mersey Royal Youth team manager Joe Wright as his assistant. However, in October Anthony Wright had to step down because of family commitments and a month later Joe Wright left the club.

In November 2016 the former Burscough captain, ex A.F.C. Liverpool assistant manager and Prescot Cables Reserve team manager Karl Bell was appointed the club's new manager. Bell left the role in May 2018 and was replaced by Cammell Laird 1907 F.C. manager Michael McGraa.

The 2018–19 season saw the club miss out on promotion to the North West Counties League Premier Division by points per game after finishing second to champions Warrington Rylands. The 2019–20 once again saw Vauxhalls denied promotion, despite it already being secured with ten games to go, the season having been declared null and void because of the coronavirus pandemic. Vauxhalls were once again atop the North West Counties League First Division South at Christmas in the 2020–21, when the season was curtailed once again because of COVID-19. However, restructuring of the English pyramid system meant that the club finally secured promotion to the North West Counties League Premier Division for the 2021–22 season via PPG from the previous two seasons. The 2022–23 season saw the Motormen winning the Premier Division championship and being promoted to Division One West of the Northern Premier League.

== Colours and badge ==
Vauxhall Motors' colours are white with a stripe of blue for the top and navy blue shorts and socks. The away kit is yellow shirts, green shorts and yellow socks. The kits have been sponsored by car retailer Lookers Wirral since 2000.

The team badge is the same as the logo of its parent company, Vauxhall Motors.

== Stadium ==
Rivacre Park has been the home of Vauxhall since the 1986 season, the club having formerly played at Hooton Park. It has a capacity of 3,300 with covered stand and terracing, with space for 350 seated guests. The stand has been refitted with new seats along with a step in the terrace at the golf course end of the ground. A new toilet block, disabled toilet and a new turnstile block have also been added. To increase capacity, more barriers have been installed to the covered terrace and the club shop has since been re-opened after the roof was damaged in a storm. The ground also has a large sports and social club. This was originally for employees of the Vauxhall plant but is also open to the public on match days etc.

From the start of the 2026/27 season, the stadium will be known as the Premier Jet Stadium, following the announcement of a new naming rights deal.

== Records ==
- Highest League Attendance: 1,752 versus Chester F.C. – 30 October 2012
- Highest FA Cup Attendance: 1,109 versus Hartlepool United (FA Cup First round replay) – 16 November 2010
- Highest FA Trophy Attendance: 1,104 versus Northwich Victoria (FA Trophy 4th round) – 2 February 2002
- Biggest Home Win: 12–2 versus Blackpool Mechanics, 9 December 1995
- Biggest Home Defeat: 6–0 versus Kettering Town, 1 March 2008; 6–0 versus Macclesfield, 22 February 2022
- Biggest Away Win: 6–0 versus Hinckley United, 5 February 2013
- Biggest Away Defeat: 6–0 versus Kettering Town, 25 August 2007
- All-Time Leading Goalscorer: Terry Fearns – 111 goals
- Most Appearances: Carl Nesbitt – 520 appearances (500 starts, 20 as sub)
- Best League Position: 11th, Conference North, 2008–09
- Best FA Cup Performance: 2nd round proper, 2002–03
- Best FA Trophy Performance: 4th round proper, 2001–02
- Best FA Vase Performance: Semi-finals, 1999–00

== Current squad ==
Note: Flags indicate national team as defined under FIFA eligibility rules; some limited exceptions apply. Players may hold more than one non-FIFA nationality.

No.	Pos.	Nation	Player
—	GK	WAL	Jack Atkinson
—	DF	LCA	Josh Solomon-Davies
—	DF	ENG	Ben Dufton-Kelly
—	DF	ENG	Adam Hughes
—	DF	ENG	Joe Akpan
—	DF	ENG	Adam Rooney
—	DF	ENG	Joe Ireland
—	DF	ENG	Harry Deakin
—	MF	ENG	Haydn Cooper
—	MF	ENG	Arthur Lomax
—	MF	ENG	Finley Heath
—	MF	ENG	Kyle King
—	MF	ENG	Tom Owens

No.	Pos.	Nation	Player
—	MF	ENG	Jacson Coppack
—	MF	ENG	Sam Turner
—	MF	ENG	Joe Akpan
—	MF	ENG	Liam Anderson
—	MF	ENG	Luka Salvatore
—	FW	ENG	Kevin Ellison
—	FW	ENG	Michael Burkey
—	FW	GAM	Pascal Gomez
—	FW	ENG	Brandon O'Keefe
—	FW	ENG	Dale Jennings
—	FW	ENG	Ste Milne
—	FW	ENG	Johnny Nixon
—	FW	ENG	Kieran Hamm

== Management Team ==
- Manager - Vacant
- First Team Coach - John Keegan
- First Team Coach - Jason Aldcroft
- Goalkeeper Coach - Mark Corbett
- Physio - Craig Dawson

== Notable players ==
Several players have gone on to play in the Football League, including

- Gregg Blundell – Formerly with Doncaster Rovers. Currently physiotherapist at Liverpool.
- Danny Collins – Formerly with Sunderland, Stoke City, Rotherham United, Nottingham Forest and Grimsby Town.
- Mark Duffy – Formerly with Doncaster Rovers, Scunthorpe United, Morecambe F.C., Birmingham City and Fleetwood Town F.C.
- Steve McNulty – Formerly with Fleetwood Town, Tranmere Rovers, Luton Town and Witton Albion.
- Mark Roberts – Formerly with Crewe Alexandra, Stevenage, Fleetwood Town and Cambridge United. Retired from Warrington Town in 2022.
- Paul Taylor – Formerly with Peterborough United and Stevenage.
- Ben Tollitt – Formerly with Portsmouth. Currently playing at AFC Fylde.
- Lloyd Saxton – Spent youth career in Liverpool, Bolton Wanderers, Stoke City. Being professional since 2006, he joined Plymouth Argyle and Bradford City. Since 2012, he joined Swedish football. Ange IF. On 2015, he moved to Allsvenskan and played for GIF Sundsvall.
- Cole Stockton – Formerly with Hearts.
- Paul Mullin - Player for EFL League One club Bradford City.

== Honours ==
- Northern Premier League
  - Premier Division Runners-up 2001–02
  - Division One Runners-up 2000–01
- North West Counties League
  - Premier Division Champions 2022―23
  - Division One Champions 1999–2000
  - Division Two Champions 1988–89, 1995–96
  - Floodlit Trophy Winners 1999–2000
  - League Cup Winners 1990–91, 1998–99
- West Cheshire League
  - Division One Champions 1985–86, 1994–95, 2002–03 (Reserves)
  - Division Two Champions 1994–95 (Reserves)
  - Division Two Bowl Winners 1967–68
- Pyke Cup
  - Winners 1999–2000 (Reserves), 2004–05 (Reserves)
  - Runners-up 1972–73
- Cheshire County F.A.
  - Amateur Cup Winners 2013–14 (Reserves)
  - Runners-up 1993–94, 2000–01, 2004–05
- Wirral F.A.
  - Senior Cup Winners 1986–87, 2010–11 (Reserves), 2012–13 (Reserves), 2014–15
  - Runners-up 1982–83, 1994–95, 1999–2000 (Reserves)
