= Bacup Borough F.C. =

Association football club in England

Coordinates: 53.708231°N 2.1998271°W

Bacup Borough
- Full name: Bacup Borough Football Club
- Nickname: The Borough
- Founded: 1879
- Ground: West View, Bacup
- Capacity: 3,000 (500 seated)
- President: Edwin Crook
- Manager: Brent Peters
- League: North West Counties League Division One North
- 2024–25: North West Counties League Division One North, 12th of 18
- Website: bacupboroughfc.com
| Home colours | Away colours |

Club logo when they were known as Bacup & Rossendale Borough

Bacup Borough Football Club is a football club based in Bacup, Lancashire, England. The club are currently members of the North West Counties League Division One North and play at West View. They are full members of the Lancashire County Football Association.

== History ==
The club was founded by brothers and former Vale of Leven players John and Robert Rankine in 1879 as Irwell Springs Football Club, a works team for the Irwell Springs Dyeing Works. In 1883–84 they reached the third round of the FA Cup, losing 8–1 at Bolton Wanderers. The club was renamed Bacup in 1892, and joined the Lancashire League during the 1893–94 season, taking over the fixtures of Barrow, who had resigned on 20 November 1893. After finishing bottom of the league in their first season, the following season saw the club achieve a top-half place in the table. However, the club withdrew from the league during the 1897–98 season without completing their fixtures.

In 1901 Bacup rejoined the Lancashire League, where they remained for two seasons before becoming founder members of the new Division Two of the Lancashire Combination in 1903. They remained in the division until the end of the 1910–11 season, when despite only finishing sixth, they were promoted to Division One; that season also saw them win the Lancashire Junior Cup. However, they were relegated back to Division Two the following season after finishing bottom. After three more years struggling at the bottom of Division Two they left the league in 1915. Following World War I, the club rejoined the league in 1920, by which time they had been renamed Bacup Borough. They remained members of the now single-division Lancashire Combination until World War II, finishing in the bottom half of the table in most seasons, one of the exceptions being a third-place finish in 1929–30.

Bacup returned to the Lancashire Combination after World War II, and won the league in 1946–47. When it was expanded to a second division in 1947, they were placed in Division One, but were relegated to Division Two at the end of the 1948–49 season, which saw them finish bottom of the table. Despite only finishing sixth in 1954–55, the club was promoted back to Division One, where they remained until the league reverted to a single division in 1968. They were runners-up in 1972–73. In 1982 the Lancashire Combination merged with the Cheshire County League to form the North West Counties League, with Bacup placed in Division Three. When the division was abolished in 1987, they were moved into Division Two. The 1989–90 saw the club claim the runners-up position, earning promotion to Division One, where they remained until being relegated at the end of the 1994–95 season.

After winning Division Two in 2002–03, Bacup were promoted back to Division One, which was renamed the Premier Division in 2008. The 2003–04 season saw the club win the League Challenge Cup, beating Newcastle Town 3–0 in the final held at Haig Avenue in Southport. In 2011–12 they won the League Challenge Cup again with a 5–0 victory over Maine Road. In 2013 the club was renamed Bacup & Rossendale Borough after nearby Rossendale United folded, They went on to finish second-from-bottom of the table in North West Counties League, but were reprieved from relegation after Kidsgrove Athletic were reprieved from relegation in the division above. However, the following season they finished in the same position, and were relegated. At the end of the season the club were renamed Bacup Borough again.

The 2015–16 season saw Bacup finish fifth in Division One, qualifying for the promotion play-offs. After beating Stockport Town 2–0 in the semi-finals, they lost 2–0 to Barnton in the final. When the division was split in 2018, the club were placed in Division One North. In 2022–23 they won the Division One Challenge Cup, defeating Ellesmere Rangers 2–0 in the final. The club retained the cup the following season, beating Wythenshawe Town 2–1 in the final.

=== Season-by-season record ===
| Season | League | Pld | W | D | L | F | A | Pts | GD | Pos | Notes |
|---|---|---|---|---|---|---|---|---|---|---|---|
| 2009–10 | North West Counties League Premier Division | 42 | 15 | 12 | 15 | 63 | 75 | 57 | −12 | 12/22 | |
| 2010–11 | North West Counties League Premier Division | 42 | 17 | 10 | 15 | 69 | 56 | 61 | +13 | 11/22 | |
| 2011–12 | North West Counties League Premier Division | 42 | 15 | 7 | 20 | 59 | 77 | 49 | −18 | 17/22 | |
| 2012–13 | North West Counties League Premier Division | 42 | 13 | 8 | 21 | 51 | 71 | 47 | −20 | 17/22 | |
| 2013–14 | North West Counties League Premier Division | 42 | 9 | 12 | 21 | 38 | 68 | 39 | −30 | 21/22 | |
| 2014–15 | North West Counties League Premier Division | 40 | 6 | 6 | 28 | 42 | 98 | 24 | −56 | 21/22 | Relegated |
| 2015–16 | North West Counties League Division One | 34 | 17 | 6 | 11 | 81 | 54 | 57 | −27 | 5/18 | |
| 2016–17 | North West Counties League Division One | 42 | 11 | 7 | 24 | 45 | 78 | 40 | −33 | 18/22 | |
| 2017–18 | North West Counties League Division One | 42 | 14 | 4 | 24 | 65 | 95 | 46 | −30 | 17/22 | |
| 2018–19 | North West Counties League Division One North | 38 | 18 | 6 | 14 | 84 | 71 | 59 | +13 | 8/20 | |
| 2019–20 | North West Counties League Division One North | 27 | 7 | 6 | 14 | 50 | 58 | 27 | −8 | 18/20 | Seasons abandoned due to COVID-19 pandemic |
| 2020–21 | North West Counties League Division One North | 3 | 3 | 0 | 0 | 9 | 2 | 9 | +7 | 10/19 | Seasons abandoned due to COVID-19 pandemic |
| 2021–22 | North West Counties League Division One North | 36 | 15 | 9 | 12 | 78 | 54 | 54 | +24 | 7/19 | |
| 2022–23 | North West Counties League Division One North | 34 | 12 | 5 | 17 | 58 | 63 | 41 | −5 | 12/18 | |
| 2023–24 | North West Counties League Division One North | 34 | 13 | 6 | 15 | 66 | 60 | 45 | +6 | 10/18 | |

== Ground ==
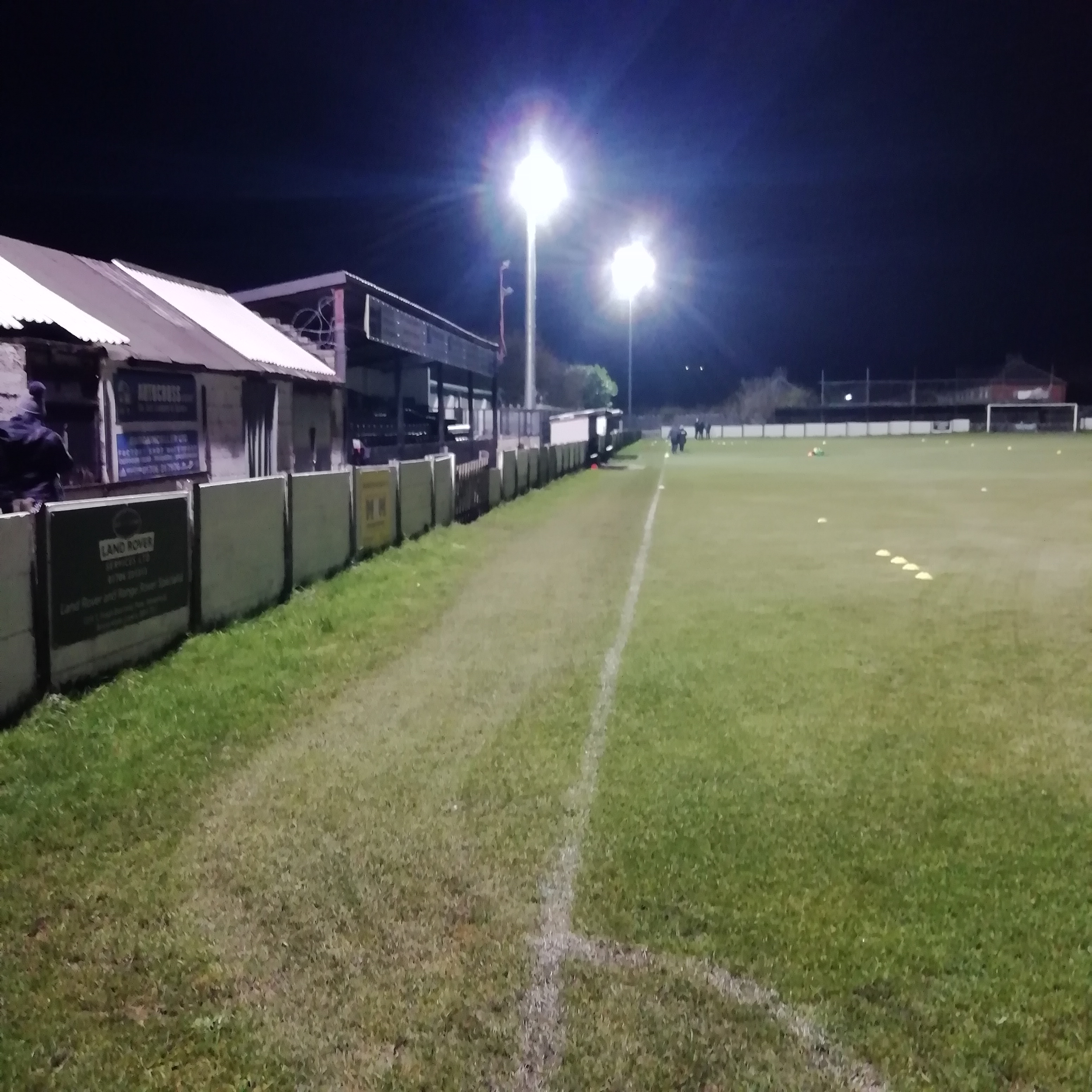
The Main Stand side at West View

Irwell Springs played at Wracker Height near Weir, before moving to a field on Weir Lane near the Dyeing Works in 1882. Home matches were also played at a field behind the Weir Hotel, another field behind Northern Primary School and one in Broadclough. The club moved to West View in Bacup in 1889, with the first match played against Accrington attracting over 1,000 spectators. It currently has a capacity of 3,000, of which 1,000 is covered and 500 seated.

== Honours ==
- North West Counties League
  - Division Two champions 2002–03
  - Challenge Cup winners 2003–04, 2011–12
  - Division One Challenge Cup winners 2022–23, 2023–24
- Lancashire Combination
  - Champions 1946–47
- Lancashire Junior Cup
  - Winners 1910–11
- Rossendale Charity Cup
  - Winners 1883–84, 1884–85, 1886–87, 1887–88

== Records ==
- Best FA Cup performance: Third round, 1883–84
- Best FA Trophy performance: Second qualifying round, 1972–73
- Best FA Vase performance: Third round, 1993–94
- Record attendance: 4,980 vs Nelson, 1947
- Most goals: Jimmy Clarke

== See also ==
- Bacup Borough F.C. players
