= North West Counties Football League =

English football league

- Founded: 1982
- Country: England
- Other club from: Isle of Man
- Divisions: Premier Division; First Division North; First Division South
- Number of clubs: 62; 20 (Premier Division); 22 (First Division North); 20 (First Division South)
- Level on pyramid: Levels 9–10
- Feeder to: Northern Premier League Division One West
- Relegation to: Cheshire Association Football League, Liverpool County Premier League, Manchester Football League, Shropshire County Football League, Staffordshire County Senior League, West Cheshire Association Football League, West Lancashire Football League
- Domestic cup(s): League Challenge Cup; First Division Cup; First Division Champions Cup; FA Cup; FA Vase
- Current champions: Wythenshawe (Premier Division); Nelson (Division One North); Runcorn Town (Division One South) (2025–26)
- Website: nwcfl.com
- Current: 2026–27 season

The North West Counties Football League (NWCFL) is a football league in the North West of England. The current geographic spread of league member clubs includes Isle of Man, Cumbria, Cheshire, Greater Manchester, Lancashire, Merseyside, Staffordshire, Shropshire, the northern-western West Midlands, the far west of West Yorkshire, and the High Peak area of Derbyshire. In the past, the league has also hosted clubs from North Wales.

Since the 2018–19 season the league has comprised three divisions: the Premier Division at level nine in the English football league system (EFLS), (Step 5 in the National League System (NLS)); and two geographic based equal ranked First Divisions, North and South, at level ten in the EFLS, (Step 6 in the NLS).

The league is a member of the Joint Liaison Council which administers the northern arm of the National Football System in England.

== Member clubs (2026–27) ==
The 2026–27 club allocations from the FA Leagues Committee (subject to appeal) were announced on 15 May 2026 and the constitution of the divisions were adopted at the league's AGM on 20 June 2026.

Locations of the NWCFL member clubs by division (2026–27).
– Premier Division – First Division North – First Division South

=== Premier Division ===
Club	Location	Home ground
Abbey Hey	Gorton, Manchester	Abbey Stadium
AFC Liverpool	Bootle	Berry Street Garage Stadium (groundshare with Bootle)
Atherton Laburnum Rovers	Atherton	Crilly Park
Barnoldswick Town	Barnoldswick	Silentnight Stadium
Burscough	Burscough	The Community Ground
Chadderton	Chadderton, Oldham	Emplas Commercial North Stadium
Charnock Richard	Charnock Richard, Chorley	Mossie Park
Droylsden	Droylsden	Butcher's Arms Ground
Euxton Villa	Euxton	Jim Fowler Memorial Ground
FC Isle of Man	(Isle of Man) Douglas	The Bowl
FC St Helens	St Helens	The Kay Welding Stadium
Glossop North End	Glossop	The Asgard Engineering Stadium
Irlam	Irlam, Salford	The Silver Street Stadium
Litherland REMYCA	Litherland	Litherland Sports Park
Longridge Town	Longridge	Inglewhite Road
Nelson	Nelson	The Daisy Arena
Prestwich Heys	Prestwich, Bury	Adie Moran Park
Ramsbottom United	Ramsbottom	The Harry Williams Riverside Stadium
South Liverpool	Liverpool	Jericho Lane
Trafford	Flixton	Shawe View

=== Division One North ===
Club	Location	Home ground
AFC Blackpool	Squires Gate, Blackpool	The Mechanics Ground
AFC Knowsley	Knowsley, Merseyside	Lord Derby Pavilion
Ashton Athletic	Ashton-in-Makerfield, Wigan	Brocstedes Park
Ashton Town	Ashton-in-Makerfield, Wigan	The Bartons Group Stadium
Ashville	Wallasey	Ray Parker Stadium
Bacup Borough	Bacup	Brian Boys West View Stadium
Cammell Laird 1907	Rock Ferry	The OWS Engineering Ltd Stadium
Colne	Colne	DM Pies Stadium
Daisy Hill	Westhoughton, Bolton	The Ginge Power Stadium
Darwen	Darwen	Multevo Group Anchor Ground
Flixton	Flixton	Valley Road Stadium
Fulwood Amateurs	Fulwood	Lightfoot Green Lane
Garstang	Garstang	The Riverside
Halewood Apollo	Halewood, Merseyside	Volair Halewood
Holker Old Boys	Barrow-in-Furness	The Handmark Engineering Stadium
Maghull	Maghull	DT Hughes Community Stadium
Maine Road	Chorlton-cum-Hardy, Manchester	Brantingham Road
Squires Gate	Squires Gate, Blackpool	The Skiddle Community Stadium
Steeton	Keighley	Marley Stadium
Thornton Cleveleys	Thornton-Cleveleys	Gamble Road
Uppermill	Mossley, Tameside	Seel Park (groundshare with Mossley)
MSB Woolton	Woolton, Liverpool	Simpsons Sports Ground

=== Division One South ===
Club	Location	Home ground
AFC Bridgnorth	Bridgnorth, Shropshire	Crown Meadow
Allscott Heath	Allscott	The Peter Ford Stadium
Alsager Town	Alsager	Wood Park
Barnton	Barnton	The Creative Hut Stadium
Bilston Town	Bilston, West Midlands	Queen Street Ground
Brereton Social	Brereton, Staffordshire	Red Lion Ground
Cheadle Heath Nomads	Cheadle Heath	Ideal Building Systems Stadium
Crewe	Crewe, Cheshire	The Excel
Dawley Town	Dawley, Telford, Shropshire	Theatre of Jockeys
Eccleshall	Eccleshall	Stoke Signage Stadium
Foley Meir	Stoke-on-Trent	Trentham Foods Stadium
Market Drayton Town	Market Drayton	Balufab Stadium
New Mills	New Mills	Church Lane
Sandbach United	Sandbach	Sandbach Community Football Centre
Shawbury United	Shawbury	Shawbury United Community Sports and Recreation Ground
Stafford Town	Stafford	Evans Park
Telford Town	Telford	Lionheart Security Services Stadium
Wednesfield Community	Wednesfield, Wolverhampton	Cottage Ground
Widnes Town	Widnes, Cheshire	DCBL Stadium
Wolverhampton Casuals	Featherstone	Brinsford Stadium

== History ==
The league was formed in 1982 by the merger of the Cheshire County League and the Lancashire Combination. Originally consisting of 58 eight clubs spread over three divisions, this was reduced to two divisions (comprising 38 clubs) in 1987 when 12 clubs from Division One left to join a newly created division of the higher ranked Northern Premier League (NPL). At the same time, promotion and relegation between the two leagues was introduced, with either the first- or second-placed club in the NWCFL being entitled to a place in the NPL, subject to their ground meeting that league's requirements.

From the 2008-09 season the two divisions, Division One and Two, were renamed the Premier and First Divisions respectively. In 2018, as part of the Football Association's ongoing restructure of the National League System, the single First Division was replaced by two regionalised divisions of equal standing, designated the First Division North and the First Division South; the expansion saw member clubs increase to sixty after fifteen clubs joined from feeder leagues.

There are seven feeder leagues from which clubs are promoted to the First Divisions of the NWCFL theses being the Cheshire Association Football League, Liverpool County Premier League, Manchester Football League, Shropshire County Football League, Staffordshire County Senior League, West Cheshire Association Football League and West Lancashire Football League. The champions of each feeder league are eligible for promotion (should they not take promotion lower placed clubs can take their place) subject to the club organisation and its ground grading meeting requirements. After taking account of promotion and relegation criteria the composition and numbers of clubs in the multiple divisions comprising each Step of the National League System (including those of the NWCFL) is decided by the FA Leagues Committee: their deliberations also result in the lateral movement of clubs across leagues to divisions at the same Step level.

There are two main league cup competitions: the League Challenge Cup which has been contested since the league's inception in 1982, is a knockout competition open to all the league's clubs and has since the 2016–17 season been sponsored by Macron; and for First Division clubs only there is the First Division Cup: this was has been contested since the 1989-90 season (when, owing to the structure of the league, it was known as the Second Division Trophy) and since the 2016–17 season has been known as the Edward Case Cup. Currently a third cup is in place, the First Division Champions Cup: following the splitting of the First Division into North and South sections from the 2018–19 season this is contested by the champions of the two divisions. Previously, from the 1990–91 season until its abandonment mid-competition during the 2000-01 season the midweek Floodlit Trophy competition was contested.

From its beginning in 1982 until 2014 the league operated a Reserves Section comprising up to two divisional levels and associated cup competitions.

Four clubs have won a Premier Division (formerly Division One) championship and League Challenge Cup double: Ashton United in 1992, Kidsgrove Athletic in 1998, F.C. United of Manchester in 2007 and in 2015 Glossop North End. In 2005 Cammell Laird completed a League Challenge Cup, Second Division Trophy and Division Two championship treble; City of Liverpool completed a cup double (League Challenge Cup and First Division Cup) in 2017. The Division Two League championship and Second Division Trophy double has been achieved by two clubs, Fleetwood Freeport in 1999 and Colne in 2004.

Atherton Laburnum Rovers are the only club to have won the same division consecutively, winning Division One in 1993 and 1994. Clitheroe won three different divisions in consecutive seasons, winning Division Three in 1984, Division Two in 1985 and Division One in 1986.

For sixteen years the league's record attendance was 1,353 for a Division Two championship decider between Radcliffe Borough and Caernarfon Town played in 1983 during its inaugural 1982–83 season. This stood until 1999 when a crowd of 2,281 saw Workington's Division One (now Premier Division) championship-deciding match with Mossley at Borough Park. In 2006 a new record was set with 6,023 at Gigg Lane for a Division Two (now First Division) match between FC United of Manchester and Great Harwood Town on 23 April. The following season an evening match attendance record of 4,058 established at Salford City's Division One home game against FC United of Manchester. The league record attendance was extended to 8,719 in 2025 at a Premier Division match, once again at Gigg Lane, between Bury and Burscough.

Three former Football League clubs, Northwich Victoria (Football League members between 1892 and 1894), Nelson (1921 to 1931) and Glossop North End (1899 to 1915, playing as Glossop), are currently members of the league, as well as Darwen F.C., a continuation of Darwen (1891 to 1899). Former league members Accrington Stanley, Fleetwood Town and Salford City currently play in the English Football League, leaving the league via promotion in 1987, 2005 and 2008 respectively.

=== League Sponsorship ===
For the following periods the North West Counties Football League has for sponsorship reasons been known as:–

- 1986 to 1993: Bass North West Counties League (named for the Bass Brewery brand)
- 1993 to 1995: Carling North West Counties League (named for the Carling lager brand)
- 1998–1999: North Western Trains Football League (named for the train operating company North Western Trains)
- 1999–2000 First North Western Trains Football League reflecting the takeover of the then current sponsor by FirstGroup
- 2004 to 2006: Moore & Co Solicitors (named for the construction solicitors business)
- 2007 to 2011: Vodkat League (named for the vodka-based drink brand)
- 2016 to 2019: Hallmark Security League (named for the security services business)

== Cup Competitions ==
=== League Challenge Cup ===
The League Challenge Cup (known for sponsorship reasons since 2016 as the Macron Cup) has been contested since the formation of the league in 1982. It is a knockout competition open to all the league's clubs.

The trophy awarded to the winners of the competition dates from 1893 and was originally the Lancashire Football League Challenge Cup until 1903, after which that league was absorbed by the Lancashire Combination. The cup was transferred to the NWCFL following its formation in 1982 and since then used as the League Challenge Cup trophy.

For the following periods the competition has for sponsorship reasons been known as:–

- 1987 to 1992: the Raab Karcher Challenge cup (named for the building materials supplier)
- 1992–1993: the Bass League cup (incorporating the League sponsor's name)
- 1993 to 1995: the Carling League cup (incorporating the League sponsor's name)
- 1998–1999: the North Western Trains League Cup (incorporating the League sponsor's name)
- 1999–2000: the First North Western Trains League Cup (incorporating the League sponsor's name)
- 2000 to 2003: the Worthington Challenge Trophy, sponsored by Coors Brewery
- 2006–2007: the d-zine League Challenge Cup, sponsored by d-zine (Contractors) Ltd
- 2007 to 2011: the Vodkat League Challenge Cup (incorporating the League sponsor's name)
- 2014 to 2016: the Men United Cup (named for the campaign to raise awareness of prostrate cancer)
- 2016 onwards: the Macron Cup (named for the Macron sportswear brand)

=== First Division Cup ===
The First Division Cup, known as the Edward Case Cup (the name of the trophy awarded to the winner) is contested by clubs at the league's First Division level. From its inauguration in 1989 until 2008 (when the league's divisions were renamed) the competition was known as the Second Division Trophy.

The trophy awarded is named for the former chairman (between 1919 and 1952) of the Cheshire County League and dates from 1932 – it was originally awarded to the highest placed side in the league that were not a Football League Club reserve side. On formation of the North West Counties League in 1982 the trophy was awarded until 1987 to the Third Division champions. Following a short gap after the discontinuation of that division it became between 1989 to 2008 the Second Division Trophy, thereafter following the renaming of the league's divisions in 2008 it is now used for the First Division Cup competition.

For the following periods the competition has for sponsorship reasons been known as:–

- 1989 to 1995: the Lamot Pils Trophy
- 2006–2007: the d-zine Second Division Trophy, sponsored by d-zine (Contractors) Ltd
- 2014 to 2017: the Reusch First Division Cup (named for the Reusch sportswear brand)
- 2017–18: LWC Drinks First Division Cup
- 2019 to 2020: the PlayerMatch.com Cup (named for the PlayerMatch.com networking sports platform)

=== First Division Champions Cup ===
The First Division Champions Cup has been contested since the 2018–19 season by the champions of the First Divisions North and South to decide the First Division Champion. It is currently played as a single match at the ground of the eligible club with the best record over the league season.

=== Floodlit Trophy (discontinued) ===
The Floodlit Trophy was a tertiary competition contested from the 1990–91 season until its mid-season abandonment (without conclusion) during the 2000–01 season. It was open to member clubs whose grounds were equipped with floodlights with matches scheduled for week-nights.

== League and cup winners ==
=== Divisional champions ===
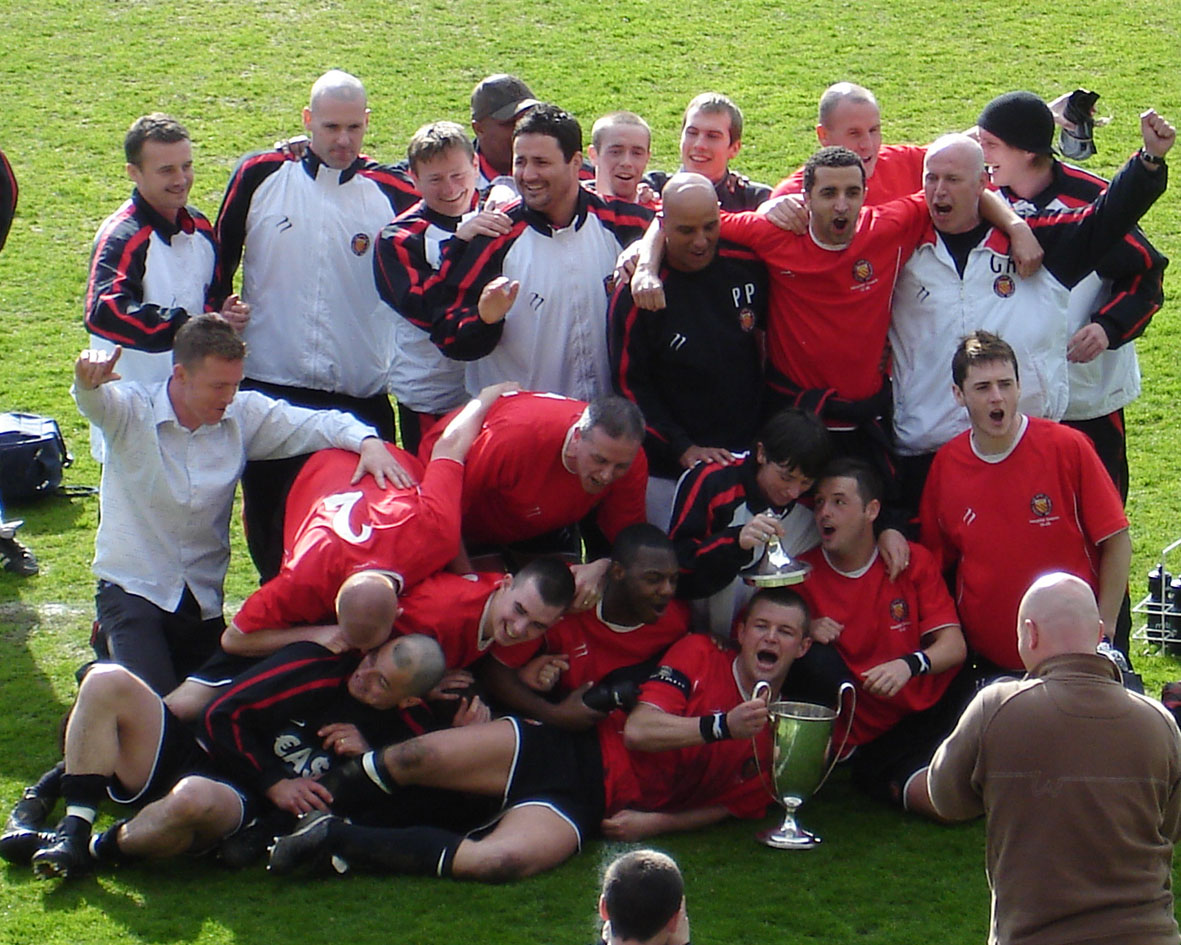
FC United of Manchester, champions of Division Two in 2005–06

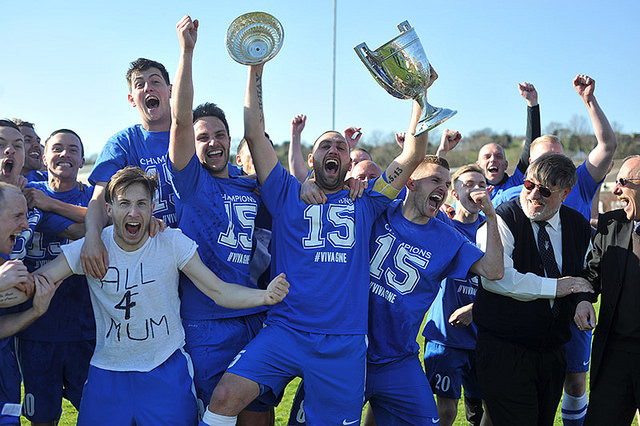
Glossop North End celebrate winning the league title in 2015

**North West Counties Football League Divisional Champions**
Season	Division One	Division Two	Division Three
The league was formed in 1982 with three divisions
1982–83	Burscough	Radcliffe Borough	Colne Dynamoes
1983–84	Stalybridge Celtic	Fleetwood Town	Clitheroe
1984–85	Radcliffe Borough	Clitheroe	Kirkby Town
1985–86	Clitheroe	Kirkby Town	Blackpool Mechanics
1986–87	Stalybridge Celtic	Droylsden	Atherton Collieries
Season	Division One	Division Two	
Owing to the upward movement of 12 clubs from Division One to the expanded Northern Premier League, Divisions One and Two were reconstituted and as a consequence Division Three was disbanded			
1987–88	Colne Dynamoes	Ashton United	
1988–89	Rossendale United	Vauxhall GM	
1989–90	Warrington Town	Maine Road	
1990–91	Knowsley United	Great Harwood Town	
1991–92	Ashton United†	Bamber Bridge	
1992–93	Atherton Laburnum Rovers	Maghull	
1993–94	Atherton Laburnum Rovers	Haslingden	
1994–95	Bradford Park Avenue	Flixton	
1995–96	Flixton	Vauxhall GM	
1996–97	Trafford	Ramsbottom United	
1997–98	Kidsgrove Athletic †	Oldham Town	
1998–99	Workington	Fleetwood Freeport ‡	
1999–2000	Vauxhall GM	Woodley Sports	
2000–01	Rossendale United	Warrington Town	
2001–02	Kidsgrove Athletic	Stand Athletic	
2002–03	Prescot Cables	Bacup Borough	
2003–04	Clitheroe	Colne ‡	
2004–05	Fleetwood Town (Note: The Fleetwood Town club that won the Division Two title in 1983–84 folded in 1993 and is therefore not the same club who won the Division One Championship in 2004–05 which was formed in 1997 as Fleetwood Wanderers, then became Fleetwood Freeport before taking the Fleetwood Town name in 2002.)	Cammell Laird ●	
2005–06	Cammell Laird	FC United of Manchester	
2006–07	FC United of Manchester †	Winsford United	
2007–08	Trafford	New Mills	
Season	Premier Division	First Division	
The league renamed their divisions to the Premier Division and First Division
2008–09	AFC Fylde	Bootle	
2009–10	Newcastle Town	Stone Dominoes	
2010–11	New Mills	AFC Blackpool	
2011–12	Ramsbottom United	Wigan Robin Park	
2012–13	Padiham	Formby	
2013–14	Norton United	Nelson	
2014–15	Glossop North End †	Atherton Collieries	
2015–16	Colne	Hanley Town	
2016–17	Atherton Collieries	Widnes	
2017–18	Runcorn Linnets	Silsden	
Season	Premier Division	First Division North	First Division South
The First Division was regionalised into two divisions
2018–19	City of Liverpool	Longridge Town	Rylands
2019–20	Season abandoned due to coronavirus pandemic		
2020–21	Season curtailed due to lockdown regulations		
2021–22	Macclesfield	Bury AFC	West Didsbury & Chorlton
2022–23	Vauxhall Motors	Pilkington	Wythenshawe Amateurs
2023–24	Wythenshawe	FC St Helens	Brocton
2024–25	Bury	Atherton Laburnum Rovers	Winsford United
2025–26	Wythenshawe	Nelson	Runcorn Town
Key †: Completed Premier Division (formerly Division One) championship and League Challenge Cup double ‡: Completed Division Two (now First Division) championship and Division Two Trophy double ●: Completed League Challenge Cup, Division Two (now First Division) championship and Division Two Trophy treble
Source: "League Honours". The NWCFL.

=== Cup winners ===
**North West Counties Football League Cup Winners**
Season	League Challenge Cup		
1982–83	Darwen		
1983–84	Ellesmere Port & Neston ♦		
1984–85	Leek Town		
1985–86	Warrington Town ♦		
1986–87	Colne Dynamoes ♦		
1987–88	Warrington Town		
1988–89	Colwyn Bay		
Season	League Challenge Cup	Division Two Trophy	
The Division Two Trophy was introduced			
1989–90	Knowsley United	Great Harwood Town	
Season	League Challenge Cup	Division Two Trophy	Floodlit Trophy
The Floodlit Trophy was introduced
1990–91	Vauxhall GM	Glossop	Colwyn Bay
1991–92	Ashton United †	Newcastle Town	Great Harwood Town
1992–93	Burscough	Stantondale	Newcastle Town
1993–94	Rossendale United	North Trafford	Bootle
1994–95	Nantwich Town	Formby	Penrith
1995–96	Burscough	Ramsbottom United	Newcastle Town
1996–97	Newcastle Town	Nelson	Colwyn Bay
1997–98	Kidsgrove Athletic †	Tetley Walker	Burscough
1998–99	Vauxhall GM	Fleetwood Freeport ‡	Clitheroe
1999–2000	Skelmersdale United	Warrington Town	Vauxhall GM
2000–01	Formby ♦	Squires Gate	Abandoned (no winner)
Season	League Challenge Cup	Division Two Trophy	
The Floodlit Trophy was discontinued			
2001–02	Prescot Cables	No competition	
2002–03	Mossley	Stone Dominoes	
2003–04	Bacup Borough	Colne ‡	
2004–05	Cammell Laird ● ♦	Cammell Laird ●	
2005–06	Salford City	Flixton	
2006–07	F.C. United of Manchester †	New Mills	
2007–08	Maine Road	Kirkham & Wesham	
Season	League Challenge Cup	First Division Cup	
The Division Two Trophy was renamed to the First Division Cup (in line with the renaming of the league's divisions)
2008–09	New Mills	AFC Liverpool	
2009–10	Abbey Hey	AFC Liverpool	
2010–11	Winsford United	Atherton Collieries	
2011–12	Bacup Borough	Norton United	
2012–13	Runcorn Linnets	West Didsbury & Chorlton	
2013–14	Ashton Athletic	Formby	
2014–15	Glossop North End †	AFC Darwen	
2015–16	Atherton Collieries	Barnton	
2016–17	City of Liverpool ♦	City of Liverpool	
2017–18	Widnes	Prestwich Heys	
Season	League Challenge Cup	First Division Cup	First Division Champions Cup
The First Division Champions Cup was introduced following the regionalisation of the First Division into two sections
2018–19	1874 Northwich	Sandbach United	Rylands
2019–20	1874 Northwich (Note: The 2020 final was delayed and played 24 July 2021 owing to the COVID-19 pandemic in England)	Sandbach United (Note: The 2020 final was delayed and played on 12 September 2020 owing to the COVID-19 pandemic in England)	Not held
2020–21	Season abandoned owing to the COVID-19 pandemic in England		
2021–22	Charnock Richard	FC Isle of Man	Not held
2022–23	Congleton Town	Bacup Borough	Wythenshawe Amateurs
2023–24	Barnoldswick Town	Bacup Borough	FC St Helens
2024–25	Charnock Richard	Atherton Laburnum Rovers	Atherton Laburnum Rovers
2025–26	A.F.C. Liverpool	Runcorn Town	Runcorn Town
Key †: Completed Premier Division (formerly Division One) championship and League Challenge Cup double ‡: Completed First Division (formerly Division Two) championship and First Division Cup double ●: Completed League Challenge Cup, Division Two (now First Division) championship and Division Two Trophy treble ♦: Won the Challenge Cup whilst a First Division (formerly Division Two) club
Source: "League Honours". The NWCFL.

==== Club records in League Challenge Cup Finals ====
Clubs in bold are members of the NWCFL as of 2026–27, clubs in italics are defunct.

Club	Finals	Wins	Last won	Runners-up	Last lost
Warrington Town	4	2	1988	2	1990
**Burscough**	4	2	1996	2	2018
Vauxhall GM	3	2	1999	1	1998
**Bacup Borough**	3	2	2012	1	2023
Newcastle Town	3	1	1997	2	2004
Skelmersdale United	3	1	2000	2	2005
Cammell Laird / **Cammell Laird 1907**	3	1	2005	2	2022
**Maine Road**	3	1	2008	2	2014
Atherton Collieries	3	1	2016	2	2015
1874 Northwich	2	2	2020	–	–
**Charnock Richard**	2	2	2025	–	–
Darwen	2	1	1983	1	1991
Colne Dynamoes / **Colne**	2	1	1987	1	2016
Colwyn Bay	2	1	1989	1	1988
Nantwich Town	2	1	1995	1	1993
Formby	2	1	2001	1	2013
Prescot Cables	2	1	2002	1	1999
**New Mills**	2	1	2009	1	2011
Winsford United	2	1	2011	1	2010
Runcorn Linnets	2	1	2013	1	2009
City of Liverpool	2	1	2017	1	2019
**Barnoldswick Town**	2	1	2024	1	2017
**Trafford**	2	–	–	2	1997
Clitheroe	2	–	–	2	2003
Curzon Ashton	2	–	–	2	2007
Ellesmere Port & Neston	1	1	1984	–	–
Leek Town	1	1	1985	–	–
Knowsley United	1	1	1990	–	–
Ashton United	1	1	1992	–	–
Rossendale United	1	1	1994	–	–
Kidsgrove Athletic	1	1	1998	–	–
Mossley	1	1	2003	–	–
Salford City	1	1	2006	–	–
F.C. United of Manchester	1	1	2007	–	–
**Abbey Hey**	1	1	2010	–	–
**Ashton Athletic**	1	1	2014	–	–
**Glossop North End**	1	1	2015	–	–
Widnes	1	1	2018	–	–
Congleton Town	1	1	2023	–	–
**A.F.C. Liverpool**	1	1	2026	–	–
Stalybridge Celtic	1	–	–	1	1984
Radcliffe Borough	1	–	–	1	1985
Leyland Motors	1	–	–	1	1987
St Helens Town	1	–	–	1	1994
**Flixton**	1	–	–	1	1996
Bootle	1	–	–	1	2008
Runcorn Town	1	–	–	1	2020
**Chadderton**	1	–	–	1	2024
**Stafford Town**	1	–	–	1	2025
West Didsbury & Chorlton	1	–	–	1	2026
