= Chadderton F.C. =

Association football club in Greater Manchester, England

Coordinates: 53°32′51″N 2°08′38″W

Chadderton
- Full name: Chadderton Football Club
- Nickname: Chaddy
- Founded: 1946
- Ground: Andrew Street, Chadderton
- Chairman: Bob Sopel
- Manager: Carl Taylor & Ben Greenidge
- League: North West Counties League Premier Division
- 2024–25: North West Counties League Premier Division, 6th of 24
- Website: chaddertonfc.co.uk
Home colours	Away colours

Chadderton Football Club is a football club in based in Chadderton, Oldham, Greater Manchester. They are currently members of the North West Counties League Premier Division and play at Andrew Street.

== History ==
The club was established in 1946 as Burnley Lane Estate Juniors and initially played in the Middleton Youth League. The following year the club moved to Mill Brow, started an adult team and were renamed Millbrow Football Club. After moving again the club was renamed North Chadderton Amateurs. At the time, the club played in the Oldham Amateur League, winning its Challenge Cup in 1954–55. They moved up to the Manchester Amateur League, winning the North division in 1955–56 and adopting their current name in 1957.

At the end of the 1958–59 season Chadderton were promoted to Division One. They were Division One champions in 1962–63, and also started playing in Division Two of the Manchester League. They were runners-up in Division Two in both 1962–63 and 1963–64, before winning the division in 1964–65. However, they were not promoted. The division was renamed Division One in 1966 and Chadderton were champions again in 1966–67, after which they were promoted to the Premier Division.

In 1980 Chadderton moved up to the Lancashire Combination. When the league merged with the Cheshire County League in 1982 to form the North West Counties League, Chadderton were founder members of Division Two. A third-place finish in 1988–89 saw them promoted to Division One. However, they finished bottom of Division One the following season and were relegated back to Division Two. Despite only finishing eleventh in 1991–92, the club were promoted to Division One again. They played in Division One until being demoted at the end of the 1997–98 season due to failing ground grading requirements. Division Two was renamed Division One in 2008.

A sixth-place finish in 2014–15 season saw Chadderton qualify for the promotion play-offs. However, they lost 2–1 to AFC Darwen in the semi-finals. In 2018 the club were placed in Division One North when the league gained another division. In 2022–23 they were runners-up in Division One North, qualifying for the play-offs. In the semi-finals they beat Euxton Villa on penalties after a 1–1 draw, before going on to defeat FC St Helens on penalties in the final (after another 1–1 draw), earning promotion to the Premier Division.

== Ground ==
The club initially played at Parkway when they were known as Burnley Lane Estate Juniors, before moving to Mill Brow the following year. In Mill Brow they played on a pitch next to the canal in Mills Hill. The nearby Rose of Lancaster pub was used as a changing room. They later moved to a ground on the Broadway road.

== Honours ==
- Manchester League
  - Division One champions 1966–67
  - Division Two champions 1964–65
  - Murray Shield Winners 1964–65
  - Gilgryst Cup winners 1969–70
- Manchester Amateur League
  - Division One champions 1962–63
  - North division champions 1955–56
- Oldham Amateur League
  - Challenge Cup winners 1954–55
- Manchester Challenge Trophy
  - Winners 1971–72

== Records ==
- Best FA Cup performance: Third qualifying round, 2025–26
- Best FA Vase performance: Fourth round, 2014–15, 2025–26
- Record attendance: 2,352 vs FC United of Manchester, 2006

== See also ==
- Chadderton F.C. players
