= Burscough F.C. =

English football club

Coordinates: 53°36′16″N 2°50′43″W

Burscough
- Full name: Burscough Football Club
- Nicknames: Green Army, Linnets, The Mighty Scough
- Founded: 1946; 80 years ago
- Ground: The Community Stadium, Burscough
- Manager: Phil Stafford
- League: North West Counties League Premier Division
- 2025–26: North West Counties League Premier Division, 10th of 24
- Website: burscoughfc.com
Home colours	Away colours

Burscough Football Club is an English football club based in Burscough, Lancashire. The club is a member of the North West Counties League, and competes in the Premier Division. Its home ground is The Community Stadium, in Burscough.

== History ==
=== Early days ===
The first Burscough Association Football Club was formed in 1880, playing in the Liverpool and District League before folding in 1900.

In 1905, Burscough Rangers were founded and moved to the Victoria Park ground in 1908. They established many of the traditions carried on by the current club, playing in green and being known as the Linnets. In the 1920s, the club won the Liverpool County Combination championship three times. In 1926, Rangers purchased a grandstand from Everton and erected it on Victoria Park. The following year they joined the Lancashire Combination but never experienced the same level of success and began to run into financial difficulties, finally folding in 1935.

Following World War II the present club was founded in 1946, starting life in the Liverpool County Combination. In their second season, 1947–48, they achieved a cup treble, winning the Lancashire Junior Cup, George Mahon Cup and the Liverpool Challenge Cup. Two years later they again claimed the Junior Cup and also won the County Combination title for the first time. In 1952, they won the Liverpool Challenge Cup for a second time.

In 1953–54 they joined the Lancashire Combination, winning the Second Division in their first season and scoring 155 goals in the process, and won the First Division title in 1955–56. Another milestone was reached in 1959 when they reached the first round of the FA Cup for the first time, before going down 3–1 to Crewe Alexandra in front of 4,200 at Victoria Park.

Another trophy-winning spell commenced in the 1966–67 season under the former England winger Bobby Langton. The club completed a hat-trick of Junior Cup successes against South Liverpool at Wigan, and regained the Lancashire Combination First Division title in 1969–70.

=== 1970s and 1980s ===
In 1970–71 Burscough joined the Cheshire County League, finishing runners-up to Rossendale United. The following season they won the Liverpool Non-League Senior Cup and in 1974–75 the Cheshire League Cup was lifted. In national competition, the club reached the FA Cup first round proper three times in four seasons, beginning with a 1–0 defeat at Blyth Spartans in 1977. A 3–0 defeat at then-third division Sheffield United in 1979 in front of 14,000 spectators was followed a year later by a 2–1 home defeat to Altrincham in 1980.

In 1981 the club were founder members of the North West Counties League, and had the distinction of becoming the league's first ever champions under Bryan Griffiths. A new grandstand seating 250 was built in 1986 to replace the sixty-year-old wooden stand which no longer met ground safety regulations. In the 1989–90 season the club were relegated to Division Two of the league.

=== 1990s ===
The appointment of Russ Perkins as manager in 1991 brought about a change in the club's fortunes as Burscough reached the League Cup final and gained promotion back to Division One. In 1992–93 Burscough lost 2–1 to Southport in the Liverpool Senior Cup Final at Goodison Park before 2,000 spectators, but won the League Challenge Cup with a 2–1 victory over Nantwich Town. 1993–94 was one of the most eventful seasons in Burscough's history as three players, Gary Martindale, Kevin Formby and Alex Russell, joined Football League clubs for substantial fees. Further covered standing accommodation for 500 spectators was erected during the close season.

In May 1995, Burscough appointed John Davison manager. In his first season the club won the League Challenge Cup for a second time, beating League champions Flixton 1–0 at Bury. Flixton were again beaten as Burscough won the annual Champions versus Cup Winners Challenge Trophy.

In 1997–98, the club were promoted as runners-up in the North West Counties Premier Division to the Northern Premier League First Division. They also won the League Floodlit Trophy and were beaten finalists of the Liverpool Senior Cup, against Liverpool.

The Linnets achieved seventh position in their first Northern Premier League season, also reaching the fourth qualifying round of the FA Cup and were Liverpool Senior Cup finalists for the third time in six seasons. In July 1999 nineteen-year-old striker Michael Yates signed for Scottish Premier League side Dundee for a five-figure transfer fee which was a club record at the time.

=== 2000s ===
1999–2000 saw the Linnets gain promotion to the Premier Division after losing only two games all season and remaining unbeaten away from home, finally finishing in runners-up spot. In their first season in the Premier Division Burscough finished 15th, had good runs in the FA Cup and FA Trophy, and won the Liverpool Senior Cup for the first time, a 1–0 victory over Conference neighbours Southport.

During this period the club had a youth development programme and one graduate, 19-year-old Lee McEvilly, signed for Rochdale in December 2001 for a club record £20,000 fee. Within 116 days of signing McEvilly had won full international honours for Northern Ireland against Spain.

Following the resignation of John Davison in May 2002, the club appointed Shaun Teale as player/manager. The ex-Aston Villa defender led the club to its greatest achievement, becoming the lowest-ranked club to win the FA Trophy following a 2–1 victory over Tamworth at Villa Park on 18 May 2003. Played in front of a crowd of 14,296, it was the Linnets' twelfth game in the competition, which included a 2-0 quarter-final win over holders, and eventual Conference champions, Yeovil Town. Despite the win, Teale was sacked six weeks later. Former Liverpool, Galatasaray and West Ham United midfielder Mike Marsh was appointed manager but after a poor start to the season Marsh resigned and ex-Southport defender Derek Goulding took over in October 2003.

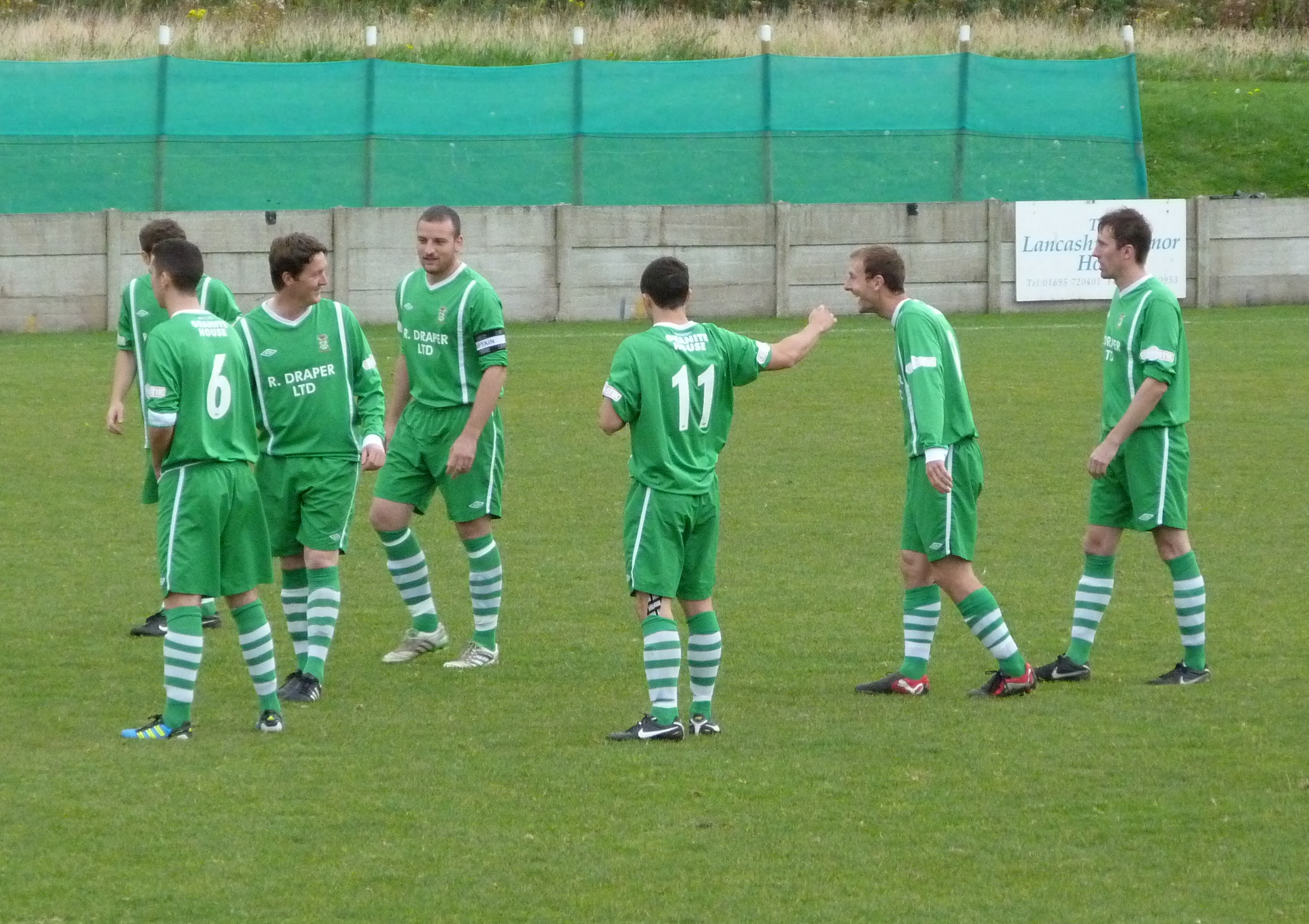
Burscough players before a match

The 2003–04 season saw Burscough finish with a run of victories that allowed them to move from the relegation zone into the promotion play-off positions. Despite playing all their games away from home, the Linnets went on to reach the play-off final where they only went down at Bradford Park Avenue following extra-time. The 2004–05 season ended in controversy as the Linnets were denied a play-off place, following a decision to award three points to other teams for unplayed games against Spennymoor United who could not complete their fixtures.

In 2005–06 the club reached the second round of the FA Cup for the first time in their history. In reaching that milestone they defeated League One side Gillingham 3–2 at Victoria Park, before losing to Burton Albion.

Burscough enjoyed one of its most successful seasons in 2006–07, winning the Northern Premier League Premier Division and two cups. The championship was only confirmed on the last day of the season with a win at AFC Telford United. The victory meant they overtook Telford and won the title on goal difference by a single goal from Witton Albion. Further success came in the Lancashire Junior Cup, won for the first time in forty years with a win over Marine, and in the Peter Swales Shield where First Division champions Buxton were defeated 3–1.

=== 2010s ===
In the 2010–11 season, Burscough finished 19th but were reprieved from relegation due to Ilkeston Town folding. In September 2011 former manager Derek Goulding returned to the club, replacing Chris Stammers.

In the 2015–16 season Burscough were relegation favourites, however they went on to reach the play-off semi-final in which they were beaten by a strong Spennymoor side.

== Stadium ==
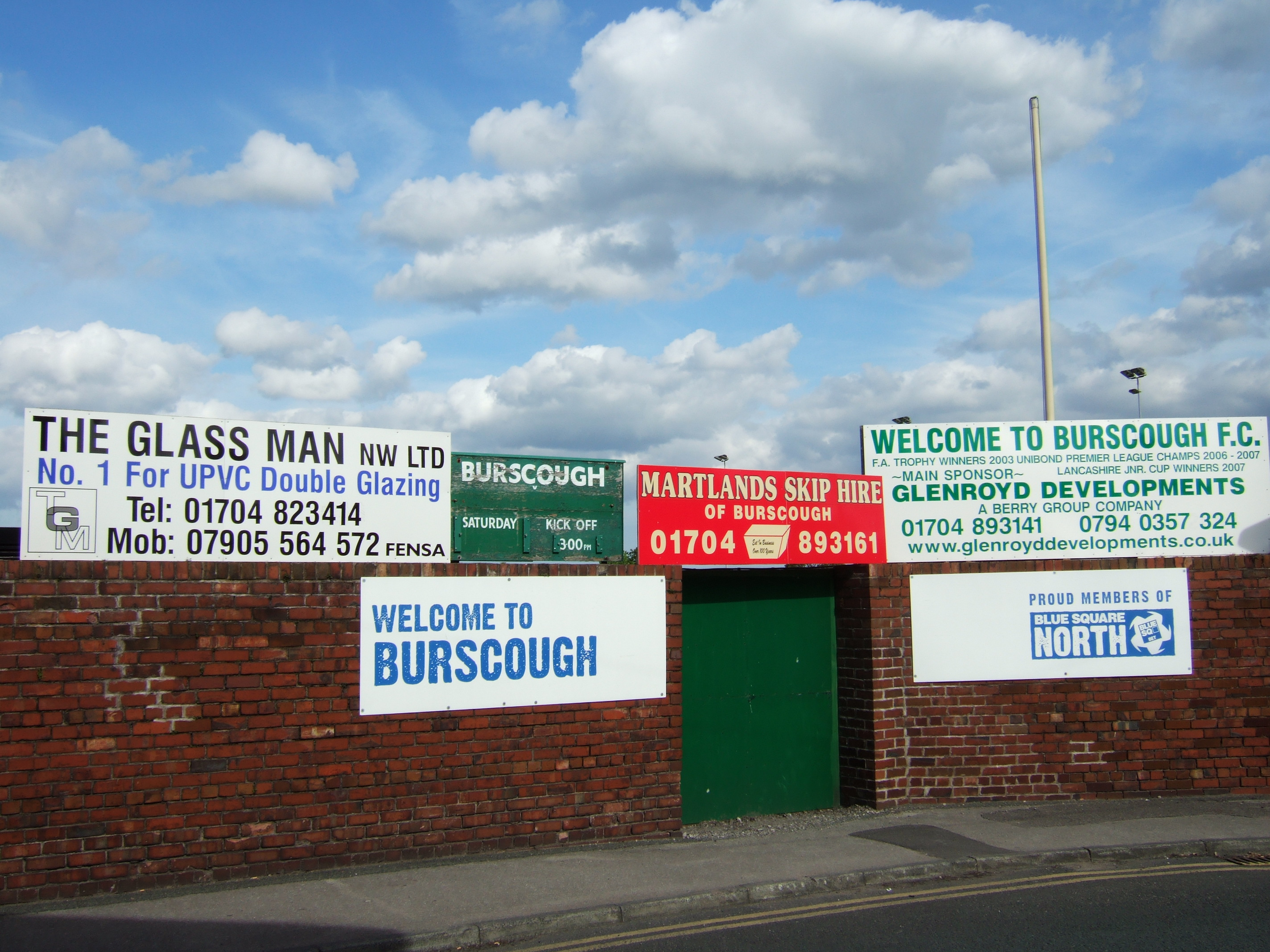
Entrance to Victoria Park

The club used to play their home games at Victoria Park, in Burscough which had a capacity of 3,054, with a 250-seat grandstand. Opposite the grandstand was a sheltered terrace. At the Crabtree Lane end of the ground was another sheltered terrace, with a smoking area between these two shelters. These two stands could provide cover for up to 1,000 standing occupants. The Mart Lane end of the ground had the main turnstiles. In 2020, the ground was demolished to facilitate a move to "The Community Ground”.

== Records ==
- Best FA Cup performance: Second round, 2005–06
- Best FA Trophy performance: Champions, 2002–03
- Best FA Vase performance: Fifth round, 1994–95

== Honours ==
- Northern Premier League
  - Premier Division champions 2006–07
- North West Counties League
  - Champions 1982–83
  - League Cup winners 1992–93, 1995–96
  - Floodlit Trophy 1997–98
- Lancashire Combination
  - Champions 1955–56, 1969–70
  - Division Two champions 1953–54
- Liverpool County Football Combination
  - Champions 1949–50
- FA Trophy
  - Winners 2002–03
- Liverpool Senior Cup
  - Winners 2000–01
- Cheshire Senior Cup
  - Winners 1974–75
- Lancashire Junior Cup
  - Winners 1947–48, 1949–50, 1966–67, 2006–07

== Notable former players ==
1. Players that have played/managed in the Football League or any foreign equivalent to this level (i.e. fully professional league).
2. Players with full international caps.
- (England) Michael Branch
- (England) John Coleman
- (England) Alan Cocks
- (England) Ryan Lowe
- (England) Mike Marsh
- (Northern Ireland) Lee McEvilly
- (England) Craig Noone
- (Wales) Connor Roberts
- (England) Alex Russell
- (England) Shaun Teale
- (England) Lee Trundle
- (England) Liam Watson
