= Knowsley United F.C. =

Knowsley United
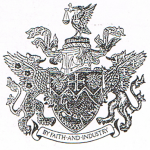
- Full name: Knowsley United Football Club
- Founded: 1963
- Dissolved: 1997
- Ground: Alt Park, Huyton
- Capacity: 5,850 (250 seats)
- 1996–97: Northern Premier League Premier Division, 15th
Home colours	Away colours

Knowsley United was an English football club based in what is now the Metropolitan Borough of Knowsley in Merseyside from 1963 to 1997. Founded in Kirkby as Kirkby Town, the club moved to Huyton in 1988 and took the name Knowsley United.

== History ==
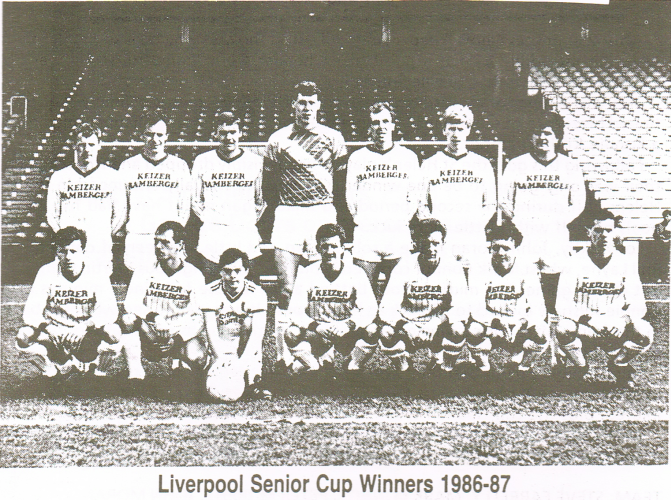
Kirkby Town team pictured in 1987

Kirkby Town joined the Second Division of the Lancashire Combination in 1963. In 1966–67 they won the division, and were promoted to the First Division. In 1969–70 they finished fourth, and were promoted to the Northern Premier League. In the same season they reached the first round of the FA Cup for the first time, but lost 6–0 at Bangor City. However, after finishing bottom of the Northern Premier League in 1971–72, they returned to the Lancashire Combination.

In 1978 the club switched to Division Two of the Cheshire County League. They finished third in 1979–80, and were promoted to Division One. However, they were immediately relegated back to Division Two after finishing 19th.

In 1982 they switched leagues again, joining the Third Division of the new North West Counties League. They won the division at the first attempt, and were promoted to Division Two, which they also won at the first attempt, resulting in promotion to Division One for the 1986–87 season.

In 1988 they changed their name to Knowsley United in an attempt to attract further support from the broader Metropolitan Borough of Knowsley. After two-second-placed finishes, the club won the league in 1990–91 and were promoted to Division One of the Northern Premier League. In 1992–93 they finished as runners-up, and were promoted to the Premier Division. The following season they reached the first round of the FA Cup for a second time, where they lost 4–1 at home to Carlisle United. The club folded in 1997.

== Stadium ==
Kirkby Town played their home games at Simonswood Lane and later Kirkby Sports Centre. The Football Ground and the night club [situated in the Main Stand of the Simonswood Lane Ground] appeared in the 1991 Frank Clarke film Blonde Fist. Upon becoming Knowsley United, they relocated to Alt Park in Huyton which was previously used by Huyton RLFC from 1969 to 1984.

Although by the time Huyton RLFC had vacated Alt Park the ground had become subject to vandalism and general disrepair, after Knowlsey United moved into Alt Park the ground underwent a series of renovations thanks largely to the involvement of the Orr family, who were the footballing proprietors of Kirkby Town FC and also the people responsible for the team's relocation to Huyton with Roby. Due to the initial success of Knowlsey United floodlights were installed and with the help of Knowsley Metropolitan Borough Council the clubhouse, grandstand & social club were recommissioned & upgraded as well. Alt Park was transformed into a respectable ground for a club the size of Knowsley United.

== Notable former players ==
- David Fairclough – former Liverpool striker and England under-21 international. Scored the winner for England B in their 2–1 away win against their West German counterparts in February 1978.
- Mike Marsh – Started as a youth player eventually playing for Kirkby Town from 1984 to 1987, Former Liverpool and Southend United player
- Ken Dugdale – Retired Wigan Athletic player and former New Zealand national team manager. Played for Kirkby Town at the start of his career
- Gary Bennett – Kirkby Town was one of the first clubs he ever played for. Former Prescot Cables F.C., F.C. United of Manchester A.F.C. Telford, and Fleetwood Town F.C. Player. Notable for scoring F.C. United of Manchester's first ever goal in a friendly match against Flixton F.C.
- John Doolan - Wigan Athletic 1990 to 1995 worked at Liverpool and Everton Academies then joining Wigan as a coach Notable went on the win Scottish Cup with Hibs 2016 after 114 years.

== Honours ==
- North West Counties Football League
  - First Division champions 1990–91
  - First Division runners-up 1989–90
  - Second Division champions 1985–86
  - Third Division champions 1984–85
- Liverpool Senior Cup
  - Winners 1986–87
- Northern Premier League
  - First Division runners-up 1992–93
- Champions Cup
  - Winners: 1989–90
- Raab Karcher Cup
  - Winners 1989–90
