= Rossendale United F.C. =

Rossendale United
- Full name: Rossendale United Football Club
- Nickname: The Stags
- Founded: 1898
- Dissolved: 2011; 15 years ago
- Ground: Dark Lane
- Capacity: 2,550
- 2010–11: North West Counties League Premier Division, 21st
Home colours	Away colours

Rossendale United Football Club was a semi-professional football club based in the village of Newchurch within the Rossendale borough of Lancashire, England. The club was founded in 1898. Nicknamed the Stags, they had a long and eventful run which saw much success, but also long periods of hardship which often endangered the club's existence before they were finally expelled from the North West Counties League Premier Division on 18 June 2011, then forced to dissolve. A new club, Rossendale F.C., was to be formed by the supporters' trust for the 2012–13 season, but plans were abandoned after the main stand burned down in January 2012.

== History ==
=== Early years ===
Their first competitive fixture took place on 3 September 1898 which ended in a 3–1 home win over Oswaldtwistle Rovers with Jack Read having the honour of scoring the club's first ever goal. Part way through their first season, Rossendale were invited to take over the fixtures of Darwen Reserves in the Lancashire Combination, as they had withdrawn from the league. The club took up the offer, but struggled at the higher level of competition winning just two games out of 17 played.

The 1899–1900 season brought a third new League, and the first silverware to the club. The Central Lancashire League Championship was won at the first attempt, a feat that would have been repeated the following season but for teams withdrawing part way through the competition meaning the loss of vital points which were to prove costly at the end.

In 1901–02 Rossendale United began their long association with the Lancashire Combination. The club played in the League for 69 years until they left to join the Cheshire County League in 1970. Success was spread pretty thin on the ground during those years, one Division One Championship win in 1926–27, Runners-Up in 1954–55 and a Division Two Championship in 1956–57 being the only League success.

The Combination Cup was also won twice, in 1929 and 1944, with Rossendale bringing home the Lancashire Junior Cup in 1912 thanks to a 2–1 win over Eccles Borough in the Final. It was also during that time the club's greatest ever goal scorer, Bob Scott, played for Rossendale United. Between 1959 and 1974 he netted 223 goals in just 203 appearances, including an astonishing 72 goals in the 1959–60 season.

=== 1970s ===
It was when the club left the Combination for the Cheshire County League in 1970 – combined with the arrival of manager Les Rigby – that success started to come. The Championship was won at the first attempt in 1970–71, with Runners-Up spot claimed in 1971–72 and 1973–74. Eight other trophies were to arrive at Dark Lane in just five seasons. The Cheshire League Cup, Cheshire League Challenge Shield, Lancashire Floodlit Trophy (twice), Lancashire Floodlit League, Lancashire Junior Cup and Ashworth Cup (twice) were won by arguably the greatest Rossendale United side of all time. There were also two memorable FA Cup runs in the early 70s. The Second Round was reached in 1971–72 before a 4–1 defeat by Bolton Wanderers in front of 12,000 at Bury's Gigg Lane brought the run to an end. The other was in 1975–76 when Shrewsbury Town claimed a controversial 1–0 win in the First Round to sneak through.

The cup run of 1975–76 proved to be the last throw of the dice from that successful side as financial difficulties struck the club hard. Matters came to a head in February 1978 when the players walked out the night before the home game against would-be champions Marine. A scratch side managed to score two goals, the only problem being that Marine managed to score 14.

=== 1980s ===
The club staged something of a recovery at the start of the 1980s as Glyn Watson managed to bring some respectability back to the side. Trouble was not far away though, and the 1981–82 season brought a high court battle for the club's Dark Lane home. During this time Rossendale United played their home games at Droylsden, and despite all the problems had their most successful season for a number of years. They finished fifth in the League and embarked on an FA Trophy run which took them to the Second Round before losing 1–0 at Slough Town.

In 1982, Rossendale United became founder members of the North West Counties League, and were placed in the Second Division on ground grading. Promotion to their rightful place in Division One was achieved in 1985–86 when they finished Runners-up to Kirkby Town. This proved to be the start of another successful period in the club's history. 1986–87 brought a comfortable mid table finish, plus an eventful FA Vase run which eventually ended in Round Five at Emley.

The NWCFL Division One Runners-Up spot was claimed in 1987–88, with Rossendale losing out to Colne Dynamoes on goal difference for the title. They went one better the season after, claiming the Championship and setting a couple of League records on the way. They remained unbeaten in the League until February, a run spanning 22 games, and set a new points record of 56 from just 34 matches (in the days of two points for a win). With the title came promotion to the Northern Premier League First Division and a respectable mid-table finish in their first season.

=== 1990s ===
1990–91 proved to be the start of the decline as the club struggled both on and off the pitch. The extra cost of the higher league, combined with falling gates and increasingly poor performances on the field, led to the inevitable relegation back to the NWCFL in 1992–93. The club's final season in the NPL was a shambles. Three managers failed to halt the slide as the campaign ended with 18 straight defeats in the club's worst ever season.

Back in the NWCFL for the 1993–94 season, the club spent heavily to try to gain an immediate return to the NPL. Atherton Laburnum Rovers pipped them to promotion as Rossendale finished runners-up. They did however win the Challenge Cup, beating St Helens Town 1–0 in a drab final at Gigg Lane. The cost of that season had a tremendous effect on the club. With little or no money, the facilities at Dark Lane fell into disrepair, as the team struggled to avoid relegation.

Rossendale United celebrated their centenary season in 1998–99, and until new owners took over at the end of the campaign, it could well have been the last season in the club's history. New owners brought a fresh outlook and the club's fortunes on and off the field took a turn for the better.

=== 2000s ===
The installation of Jim McCluskie as manager saw Rossendale claim the NWCFL Division one title in 2000–01, and following an excellent start in 2001–02, Rossendale topped the NPL Division one table in the early stages of the campaign. Unfortunately, key players were lost through injury and the club dropped down the table but still finished a highly respectable ninth place, their highest ever finish in the Non-League pyramid.

The next three seasons saw a procession of managers at the club as they all tried, and failed to repeat the success of McCluskie's side. 2004–05 should have seen the club relegated back to the North West Counties League but an off the pitch reprieve saved them from the drop as they retained their NPL status.

Following a disappointing start to the 2005–06 season, the board acted swiftly to bring in former Ramsbottom United manager Derek Egan in an attempt to revive the club's fortunes. Egan managed this and at one point a place in the end of season play-offs looked likely as the side embarked on an impressive run of results.

2006–07 saw another good season on the pitch, but great turmoil off it. But for a bad run during February and March the club would have reached the play-offs, the side eventually finishing ninth. The future of Rossendale was once again hanging by a thread, but a new board was put together and a deal was made to save the club. The board's first job was to retain the services of manager Derek Egan, a job they successfully achieved, so things were once again looking bright at Dark Lane as the club headed into 2007–08.

=== Dissolution ===
After a bad start to the season both on and off the pitch Rossendale found themselves at the bottom of the North West Counties League Premier Division (5 February 2011) and the voluntary board and backroom staff who had been running the club for around two years resigned.

In a statement from Steve Hobson, Chairman of Rossendale United, he said, "Those of us behind the scenes have fought tooth and nail, for the past two seasons to keep the club going. Our supporters know why we have resigned and I am not prepared to go into the reasons publicly. My family, friends and I have given our all to the club for many years now and we have come to a point where someone else needs to 'pick up the baton and run'. We wish the club well and hope that owner Andrew Connolly can find the right people to take the club further".

"The club has since been on sale for around a year now for a total of £750,000, but there has been no real interest, and the owner, Andrew Connolly has not been willing to put any money into the club. With the club on the verge of getting repossessed by the bank, Mr Connolly needs to reinvest in the club or find a new owner."

On 15 January 2012, firefighters were called to deal with a fire in the main stand.

=== Failed new club ===
In June 2011, Rossendale United supporters' trust chairman Ron Ashworth announced the possibility of a new community-based club to be formed. A public meeting was then held on 21 July 2011 with the intention of holding a vote to set up a new club. The vote was unanimously in support of a new club. The club would have been owned by fans and governed as a community or co-operative society. Supporters Direct has helped in the establishment of the new club.

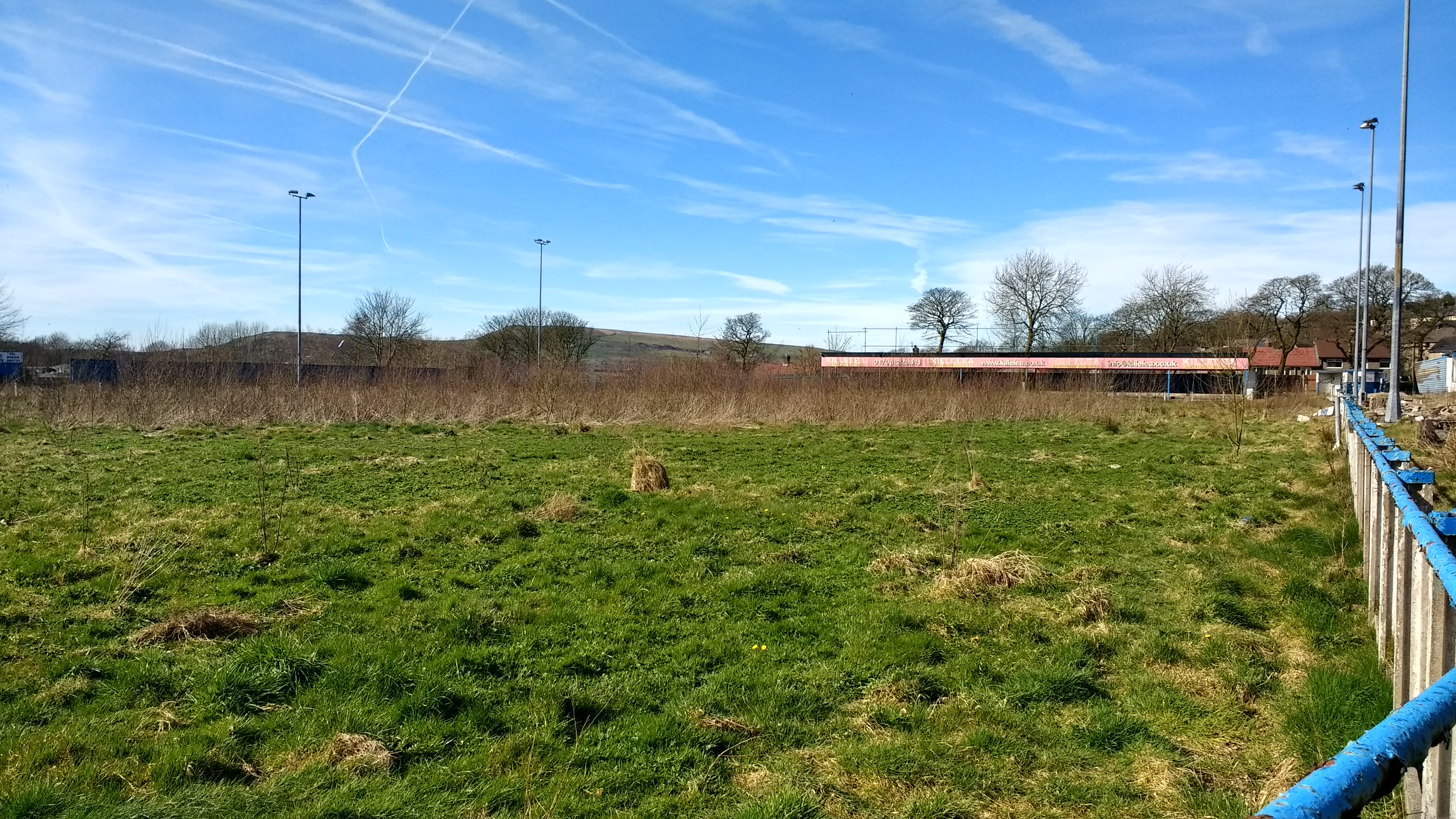
Rossendale's former home, left abandoned

A further meeting in August determined that the name of the new club be Rossendale F.C..

Rossendale F.C. aimed to field a senior side for the 2012–13 season either in the West Lancashire League (level 11) or division one of the North West Counties League (level 10). The former team had been competing in the Premier Division of the North West Counties League (level 9) when it was expelled.

In April 2012 plans for the new club were abandoned. This was in part due to the lack of an available ground after the Dark Lane stand burned down in January 2012. The derelict site has received outline planning permission for 100 new family homes.

== Colours ==
The club's original colours were amber and black; it adopted blue and white stripes, with blue knickers, in August 1903.

== Honours ==
=== Domestic ===
==== League ====
- North West Counties League Division One
  - Champions: 1988–89, 2001–02
  - Runners-up: 1987–88, 1993–94
- North West Counties League Division Two
  - Runners-up: 1985–86
- Cheshire County League
  - Champions: 1970–71
  - Runners-up: 1971–72, 1973–74
- Lancashire Combination
  - Champions: 1926–27
  - Runners-up: 1954–55
- Lancashire Combination Division Two
  - Champions: 1956–57

== Club records ==
- FA Cup
  - Second Round 1971–72
- FA Trophy
  - Second Round 1981–82
- FA Vase
  - Fifth Round 1986–87
