= List of Chorley F.C. seasons =

Chorley Football Club is a semi-professional football club based in Chorley, Lancashire, England. The club was founded as a rugby union club in 1875 but switched to football in 1883.

== Early history ==
Chorley joined the Lancashire Junior League in 1889, and the following year became a member of the Lancashire Alliance, a league which they were crowned champions of in 1892–93 and runners-up in 1893–94. The Lancashire Junior Cup came to Chorley in 1894, nine years after the trophy's institution, and their win was the first of a record number of successes for the Magpies. They beat Clitheroe 3–2 in a replayed final at Ewood Park, Blackburn after a 2–2 draw. Chorley bid farewell to the Lancashire Alliance at the end of the 1893–94 season and joined the Lancashire League, winning the championship in 1896–97. Chorley won another championship in 1898–99, but was clouded by a notice to quit their Dole Lane Ground, and the loss of captain Johnny Parker, who had broken his leg. In May 1899 Chorley applied to join the Football League's Second Division, coming sixth in voting, with the top two being elected. September 1901 saw Chorley move to the Rangletts Ground, taking even the grandstand and hoardings, and 1903 saw the Lancashire League restructured as the Lancashire Combination, which was extended in size to encompass two divisions, A and B, with Chorley playing in the Combination B Division. Chorley suffered their worst season in 1914–15, finishing bottom of the league, but the outbreak of the First World War saved them from relegation, for the Combination, like the Football League, suspended its competitions in 1915. During the war Chorley joined the Northern Division but due to difficulties in raising a team they were disbanded early in 1916. Chorley did not have a team for the next two seasons, but in August 1918 formed a side for friendly matches. Chorley took their place in the reassembled Combination (there was only one division by now) with what proved to be one of their finest-ever teams.

== Key ==
Key to league record

- Level = Level of the league in the current league system
- Pld = Games played
- W = Games won
- D = Games drawn
- L = Games lost
- GF = Goals for
- GA = Goals against
- GD = Goals difference
- Pts = Points
- Position = Position in the final league table
- Top scorer and number of goals scored shown in bold when he was also top scorer for the division.

Key to cup records

- Res = Final reached round
- Rec = Final club record in the form of wins-draws-losses
- PR = Preliminary round
- QR1 (2, etc.) = Qualifying Cup rounds
- G = Group stage
- R1 (2, etc.) = Proper Cup rounds
- QF = Quarter-finalists
- SF = Semi-finalists
- F = Finalists
- A(QF,SF,F) = Area quarter-, semi-, finalists
- W = Winners

== Seasons ==
Year	League														Cup competitions				Manager
Year	Division	Lvl	Pld	W	D	L	GF	GA	GD	Pts	Position	Leading league scorer		Average attendance	FA Cup		FA Trophy		Manager
Year	Division	Lvl	Pld	W	D	L	GF	GA	GD	Pts	Position	Name	Goals	Average attendance	Res	Rec	Res	Rec	Manager
No competitive football was played between 1915 and 1919 due to the World War I. Lancashire Combination switched to a single division.
1919–20	**Lancashire Combination**		34	25	2	7	101	30	+71	52	**1st of 18**								
1920–21	**Lancashire Combination**		34	15	7	12	47	44	+3	37	**8th of 18**								
1921–22	**Lancashire Combination**		34	22	4	8	79	43	+36	48	**2nd of 18**								
1922–23	**Lancashire Combination**		34	19	9	6	78	38	+40	47	**1st of 18**								
1923–24	**Lancashire Combination**		38	17	7	14	77	66	+11	41	**10th of 20**								
1924–25	**Lancashire Combination**		36	10	8	18	49	77	-28	28	**16th of 19**								
1925–26	**Lancashire Combination**		38	16	7	15	103	101	+2	39	**11th of 20**								
1926–27	**Lancashire Combination**		38	25	9	4	111	45	+66	59	**2nd of 20**								
1927–28	**Lancashire Combination**		38	28	3	7	128	49	+79	59	**1st of 20**								
1928–29	**Lancashire Combination**		38	29	3	6	125	52	+73	61	**1st of 20**								
1929–30	**Lancashire Combination**		38	19	9	10	89	53	+36	47	**5th of 20**								
1930–31	**Lancashire Combination**		38	15	9	14	86	68	+18	39	**10th of 20**								
1931–32	**Lancashire Combination**		36	17	5	14	85	71	+14	39	**9th of 19**								
1932–33	**Lancashire Combination**		38	28	6	4	113	44	+69	62	**1st of 20**								
1933–34	**Lancashire Combination**		38	29	3	6	133	53	+80	61	**1st of 20**								
1934–35	**Lancashire Combination**		38	25	2	11	94	54	+40	52	**3rd of 20**								
1935–36	**Lancashire Combination**		40	22	4	14	100	82	+18	48	**5th of 21**								
1936–37	**Lancashire Combination**		40	22	5	13	120	74	+46	49	**5th of 21**								
1937–38	**Lancashire Combination**		42	18	4	20	93	104	-11	40	**13th of 22**								
1938–39	**Lancashire Combination**		42	23	3	12	118	62	+56	53	**5th of 22**				R1	1–1–1			
No competitive football was played between 1939 and 1945 due to the World War II.
1945–46	**Lancashire Combination**		22	14	4	4	78	42	+36	32	**1st of 12**				R1	4–0–1			
1946–47	**Lancashire Combination**		42	13	9	20	84	92	-8	35	**17th of 22**				QR2	1–2–1			
1946–47	**Lancashire Combination**		The league expanded to two divisions.												QR2	1–2–1			
1947–48	**Lancashire Combination**; **Division One**		42	19	7	16	89	74	+15	45	**11th of 22**				QR1	0–0–1			
1948–49	**Lancashire Combination**; **Division One**		42	23	12	7	72	55	+17	58	**2nd of 22**				PR	0–0–1			
1949–50	**Lancashire Combination**; **Division One**		42	20	9	13	71	67	+4	49	**4th of 22**				QR2	2–0–1			
1950–51	**Lancashire Combination**; **Division One**		42	17	10	15	91	93	-2	44	**8th of 22**				PR	0–0–1			
1951–52	**Lancashire Combination**; **Division One**		42	16	10	16	66	72	-6	42	**11th of 22**				PR	0–0–1			
1952–53	**Lancashire Combination**; **Division One**		42	16	5	21	81	87	-6	37	**16th of 22**				QR1	0–0–1			
1953–54	**Lancashire Combination**; **Division One**		40	12	10	18	51	60	-9	34	**18th of 21**				QR1	0–1–1			
1954–55	**Lancashire Combination**; **Division One**		42	17	7	18	78	91	-13	41	**13th of 22**				QR4	4–1–1			
1955–56	**Lancashire Combination**; **Division One**		38	17	5	16	78	68	+10	39	**9th of 20**				QR2	2–0–1			
1956–57	**Lancashire Combination**; **Division One**		38	15	8	15	74	74	0	38	**8th of 20**				QR2	1–0–1			
1957–58	**Lancashire Combination**; **Division One**		42	20	7	15	123	85	+38	47	**9th of 22**				QR4	3–0–1			
1958–59	**Lancashire Combination**; **Division One**		42	22	7	13	109	82	+27	51	**6th of 22**				QR4	4–2–1			
1959–60	**Lancashire Combination**; **Division One**		42	31	5	6	133	48	+85	67	**1st of 22**				QR1	0–0–1			
1960–61	**Lancashire Combination**; **Division One**		42	31	7	4	125	33	+92	69	**1st of 22**				QR3	2–1–1			
1961–62	**Lancashire Combination**; **Division One**		42	24	9	9	107	71	+36	57	**5th of 22**				QR1	0–0–1			
1962–63	**Lancashire Combination**; **Division One**		42	31	6	5	137	59	+78	68	**2nd of 22**				QR2	1–1–1			
1963–64	**Lancashire Combination**; **Division One**		42	27	7	8	114	51	+63	61	**1st of 22**				R1	4–0–1			
1964–65	**Lancashire Combination**; **Division One**		42	27	9	6	130	55	+75	63	**2nd of 22**				QR1	0–0–1			
1965–66	**Lancashire Combination**; **Division One**		42	24	12	6	121	56	+65	60	**2nd of 22**				QR4	3–2–1			
1966–67	**Lancashire Combination**; **Division One**		42	23	9	10	97	59	+38	55	**4th of 22**				QR4	3–1–1			
1967–68	**Lancashire Combination**; **Division One**		42	17	9	16	72	65	+7	43	**11th of 22**				QR2	1–2–1			
1967–68	**Lancashire Combination**; **Division One**		Joined the newly created Northern Premier League.												QR2	1–2–1			
1968–69	**Northern Premier League**	5	38	8	9	21	46	75	-29	25	**19th of 20**				QR1	0–1–1			
1969–70	**Lancashire Combination**		38	27	6	5	112	35	+77	60	**3rd of 20**				QR1	0–1–1	QR2	1-1-1	
1970–71	**Northern Premier League**	5	42	14	14	14	58	61	-3	42	**10th of 22**				QR1	1–0–1	R3	5-2-1	
1971–72	**Northern Premier League**	5	46	17	12	17	66	59	+7	46	**13th of 24**				QR2	1–0–1	R3	3-1-1	
1972–73	**Cheshire County League**		42	18	9	15	69	50	+19	45	**9th of 22**				QR2	2–2–1	R1	0-0-1	
1973–74	**Cheshire County League**		42	23	11	8	68	39	+29	57	**3rd of 22**				QR3	2-2-1	R1	0-0-1	
1974–75	**Cheshire County League**		42	19	11	12	86	68	+18	49	**6th of 22**				QR1	1-1-1	QR3	0-1-1	
1975–76	**Cheshire County League**		42	29	5	8	88	33	+55	63	**2nd of 22**				R2	2-0-1	QR3	0-1-1	
1976–77	**Cheshire County League**		42	28	6	8	80	35	+45	62	**2nd of 22**				QR1	0-0-1	QF	6-4-1	
1977–78	**Cheshire County League**		42	19	11	12	69	48	+21	49	**9th of 22**				QR3	2-0-1	R2	2-0-1	
1977–78	**Cheshire County League**		The league expanded to two divisions.												QR3	2-0-1	R2	2-0-1	
1978–79	**Cheshire County League**; **Division One**		42	21	8	13	66	43	+23	50	**7th of 22**				R1	4-0-1	R2	2-2-1	
1979–80	**Cheshire County League**; **Division One**		38	20	11	7	60	35	+25	51	**3rd of 22**				QR1	0-0-1	R2	1-1-1	
1980–81	**Cheshire County League**; **Division One**		38	17	11	10	65	48	+17	45	**6th of 20**				QR3	3-0-1	R1	0-0-1	
1981–82	**Cheshire County League**; **Division One**		38	23	9	6	70	34	+36	55	**2nd of 20**				QR2	1-2-1	R2	2-0-1	
1982–83	**Northern Premier League**	6	42	23	11	8	77	49	+28	80	**4th of 22**				QR3	3-2-1	R2	2-2-1	
1983–84	**Northern Premier League**	6	42	14	11	17	68	65	+3	53	**14th of 22**				QR2	1-0-1	R2	1-2-1	
1984–85	**Northern Premier League**	6	42	12	10	20	47	63	-16	46	**19th of 22**				QR3	2-0-1	R1	0-0-1	
1985–86	**Northern Premier League**	6	42	9	15	18	56	64	-8	42	**20th of 22**				R1	4-0-1	QR3	0-0-1	
1986–87	**Northern Premier League**	6	42	16	12	14	58	59	-1	60	**9th of 22**				R2	5-3-1	QR1	0-0-1	
1986–87	**Northern Premier League**	6	The league expanded to two divisions.												R2	5-3-1	QR1	0-0-1	
1987–88	**Northern Premier League**; **Premier Division**	6	42	26	10	6	78	35	+43	88	**1st of 22**				R1	1-0-1	QR2	1-0-1	
1988–89	**Football Conference**	5	40	13	6	21	57	71	-14	45	**17th of 21**				QR4	0-1-1	R1	0-0-1	
1989–90	**Football Conference**	5	42	13	6	23	42	67	-25	45	**20th of 22**				QR4	0-2-1	QR3	0-0-1	
1990–91	**Northern Premier League**; **Premier Division**	6	40	12	10	18	55	55	0	46	**14th of 21**				R2	5-0-1	R1	1-1-1	
1991–92	**Northern Premier League**; **Premier Division**	6	42	11	9	22	61	82	-21	42	**21st of 22**				QR4	0-2-1	QR3	0-0-1	
1992–93	**Northern Premier League**; **Premier Division**	6	42	10	10	22	52	93	-41	40	**18th of 22**				QR1	0-1-1	QR1	0-1-1	
1993–94	**Northern Premier League**; **Premier Division**	6	42	17	10	15	70	67	+3	61	**10th of 22**				QR4	3-1-1	QR2	1-1-1	
1994–95	**Northern Premier League**; **Premier Division**	6	42	11	7	24	64	87	-23	40	**18th of 22**				QR2	1-1-1	QR2	1-0-1	
1995–96	**Northern Premier League**; **Premier Division**	6	42	14	9	19	67	74	-7	51	**14th of 22**				QR2	1-1-1	SF	7-3-1	
1996–97	**Northern Premier League**; **Premier Division**	6	44	16	9	19	69	66	+3	57	**13th of 23**				QR1	0-0-1	R1	0-0-1	
1997–98	**Northern Premier League**; **Premier Division**	6	42	14	7	21	51	70	-19	49	**15th of 22**				QR3	2-1-1	R1	0-1-1	
1998–99	**Northern Premier League**; **Premier Division**	6	42	8	15	19	45	68	-23	39	**21st of 22**				QR3	1-2-1	R3	1-1-1	
1999–2000	**Northern Premier League**; **Division One**	7	42	13	15	14	53	64	-11	54	**13th of 22**				QR3	3-0-1	R1	0-0-1	
2000–01	**Northern Premier League**; **Division One**	7	42	15	14	13	71	70	+1	59	**10th of 22**				QR2	2-0-1	R1	0-1-1	
2001–02	**Northern Premier League**; **Division One**	7	42	16	9	17	59	57	+2	57	**13th of 22**			202	QR1	1-0-1	R1	0-0-1	
2002–03	**Northern Premier League**; **Division One**	7	42	21	10	11	80	51	+29	73	**5th of 22**			280	QR1	1-0-1	QR1	0-1-1	
2002–03	**Northern Premier League**; **Division One**	7	Lost in the **play-off** final												QR1	1-0-1	QR1	0-1-1	
2003–04	**Northern Premier League**; **Division One**	7	42	13	10	19	54	70	-16	49	**18th of 22**			240	QR3	3-2-1	PR	0-0-1	Mark Patterson
2003–04	**Northern Premier League**; **Division One**	7	Level of the league decreased after the Conference North and South creation.												QR3	3-2-1	PR	0-0-1	Mark Patterson
2004–05	**Northern Premier League**; **Division One**	8	42	13	9	20	62	69	-7	48	**16th of 22**			207	QR2	2-1-1	PR	0-0-1	Shaun Teale
2005–06	**Northern Premier League**; **Division One**	8	42	14	8	20	58	59	-1	50	**18th of 22**			195	QR1	1-2-1	QR1	0-0-1	Shaun Teale
2006–07	**Northern Premier League**; **Division One**	8	46	10	6	30	52	99	-47	36	**23rd of 24**			230	QR1	1-0-1	QR1	0-0-1	Shaun Teale; Paul Lodge; Gerry Luczka
2007–08	**Northern Premier League**; **Division One North**	8	42	10	12	20	56	80	-24	42	**14th of 18**			343	QR1	1-2-0	QR1	0-0-1	Gerry Luczka; Tony Hesketh
2008–09	**Northern Premier League**; **Division One North**	8	40	13	8	19	56	66	-10	47	**14th of 21**			264	PR	0-0-1	PR	0-1-1	Tony Hesketh
2009–10	**Northern Premier League**; **Division One North**	8	42	13	10	19	56	76	-20	49	**16th of 22**			271	QR3	3-0-1	QR1	1-0-1	Steve Waywell
2010–11	**Northern Premier League**; **Division One North**	8	44	25	11	8	87	43	+44	86	**3rd of 23**			757	PR	0-0-1	QR3	2-0-1	Garry Flitcroft
2010–11	**Northern Premier League**; **Division One North**	8	Promoted after winning the **play-off**												PR	0-0-1	QR3	2-0-1	Garry Flitcroft
2011–12	**Northern Premier League**; **Premier Division**	7	42	24	7	11	76	48	+28	79	**3rd of 22**			957	QR1	0-1-1	QR1	0-0-1	Garry Flitcroft
2011–12	**Northern Premier League**; **Premier Division**	7	Lost in the **play-off** semifinal												QR1	0-1-1	QR1	0-0-1	Garry Flitcroft
2012–13	**Northern Premier League**; **Premier Division**	7	42	20	7	15	63	52	+11	67	**8th of 22**			638	QR2	1-0-1	QR1	0-0-1	Garry Flitcroft
2013–14	**Northern Premier League**; **Premier Division**	7	46	29	10	7	107	39	+68	97	**1st of 24**			949	QR2	1-0-1	R3	4-4-0	Garry Flitcroft
2014–15	**Conference North**	6	42	20	11	11	76	55	+21	49	**4th of 22**	James Dean	20	1,163	QR4	2-1-1	R2	2-2-1	Garry Flitcroft
2014–15	**Conference North**	6	Lost in the **play-off** final												QR4	2-1-1	R2	2-2-1	Garry Flitcroft
Fifth and sixth tier divisions renamed
2015–16	**National League North**	6	42	18	9	15	64	55	+9	63	**8th of 22**	Darren Stephenson	18	1,003	QR4	2-1-1	QR3	0-1-1	Matt Jansen
2016–17	**National League North**	6	42	20	14	8	60	41	+19	74	**6th of 22**	Jason Walker	14	1,405	QR3	1-0-1	R1	1-0-1	Matt Jansen
2016–17	**National League North**	6	Lost in the **play-off** final												QR3	1-0-1	R1	1-0-1	Matt Jansen
2017–18	**National League North**	6	42	18	14	10	52	39	+13	68	**6th of 22**	Marcus Carver	12	1,098	R1	3-1-1	R1	1-0-1	Matt Jansen
2017–18	**National League North**	6	Lost in the **play-off** semifinal												R1	3-1-1	R1	1-0-1	Matt Jansen
2018–19	**National League North**	6	42	24	9	29	83	41	+42	81	**2nd of 22**	Marcus Carver	14	1,473	R1	3-1-1	QR3	0-0-1	Jamie Vermiglio
2018–19	**National League North**	6	Promoted after winning the **play-off**												R1	3-1-1	QR3	0-0-1	Jamie Vermiglio
2019–20	**National**; **League**	5	38	4	14	20	31	65	-34	26	**24th of 24**	Alex Newby; Chris Holroyd	6	1,271	R1	1-0-1	R1	0-2-0	Jamie Vermiglio
2019–20	**National**; **League**	5	The regular season was cut short due to COVID-19, final league positions decided by points-per-game												R1	1-0-1	R1	0-2-0	Jamie Vermiglio
2020–21	**National League North**	6	18	6	5	7	21	25	-4	23	7th of 22	Connor Hall	5	– (Note: COVID-19 prevented fans from attending games)	R4	5-0-1	R1	0-0-1	Jamie Vermiglio
2020–21	**National League North**	6	The season was declared null and void due to COVID-19.												R4	5-0-1	R1	0-0-1	Jamie Vermiglio
2021–22	**National League North**	6	42	17	14	11	62	49	+13	65	**6th of 22**	Connor Hall	10	1,172	QR2	0–1–1	R2	0–1–0	Jamie Vermiglio
2021–22	**National League North**	6	Lost in the **play-off** quarterfinal												QR2	0–1–1	R2	0–1–0	Jamie Vermiglio
2022–23	**National League North**	6	46	17	15	14	62	50	+12	66	**12th of 24**	Connor Hall	20	1,053	QR3	1–1–1	R3	1–0–1	Andy Preece
2023–24	**National League North**	6	46	23	7	10	87	44	+43	76	**4th of 24**	Carlton Ubaezuonu	15	1,363	QR3	1–1–1	R5	3–0–1	Andy Preece
2023–24	**National League North**	6	Lost in the **play-off** semifinal												QR3	1–1–1	R5	3–0–1	Andy Preece
2024–25	**National League North**	6	46	22	13	11	76	49	+27	79	**5th of 24**	Mark Ellis	14	1,358	QR3	1–0–1	R4	2–0–1	Andy Preece
2024–25	**National League North**	6	Lost in the **play-off** semifinal												QR3	1–0–1	R4	2–0–1	Andy Preece

== Notes ==
- Chorley at the Football Club History Database
