= List of London Broncos home grounds =

London Broncos home stadiums

Since their formation in 1980 as Fulham RLFC, London Broncos have been based at 10 different grounds in Greater London. In addition, they have also played occasional first team home matches at four other grounds within the Greater London area, namely: Hendon F.C.'s Claremont Road, Wealdstone F.C.'s Lower Mead, Chelsea F.C.'s Stamford Bridge and Leyton Orient's Brisbane Road stadium. The club's long term home grounds are as follows:

== Stadia ==
=== Craven Cottage: 1980–1984 ===
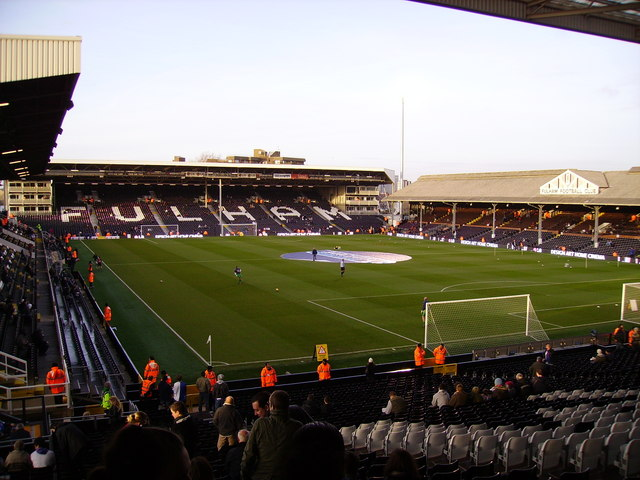

Founded as Fulham RLFC in 1980, the team, then called "Fulham" played their home games at Craven Cottage. Craven Cottage held the team's largest ever home attendance at any ground, with 15,013 for a Challenge Cup game against Wakefield Trinity on 15 February 1981.

=== Crystal Palace National Sports Centre: 1984–1985 / 1990–1993 ===
In the summer of 1984 the club moved to play its home games at The National Sports Centre stadium at Crystal Palace, making the athletics stadium their base for the 1984–85 season. The club later returned here prior to the 1990–91 season and remained for three years.

=== Polytechnic Sports Ground: 1985–1990 ===
The club found a permanent ground in Chiswick where they stayed for five years, before returning in 1990 to Crystal Palace National Sports Centre for a second time.

=== Barnet Copthall Stadium: 1993–1995 ===
The club moved again in 1993 to Barnet Copthall stadium in north London, at the time primarily an athletics arena, where they remained for another three-year stint before moving once again.

=== The Stoop: 1995–1996 / 1997–1999 / 2007–2013 ===
London ground shared with rugby union side Harlequins for the shortened 1995–96 season. The Broncos later returned to The Stoop for a three-year period in 1997, during which time they reached their first Challenge Cup Final. In 2007 the Broncos returned to the Stoop for a third time, and became known as Harlequins RL, formally becoming a sister club to Harlequins FC and adopting the host club's crest and colours. They stayed at the Stoop until the lease ran out in 2013. This 7-year stay was their longest at any ground to date.

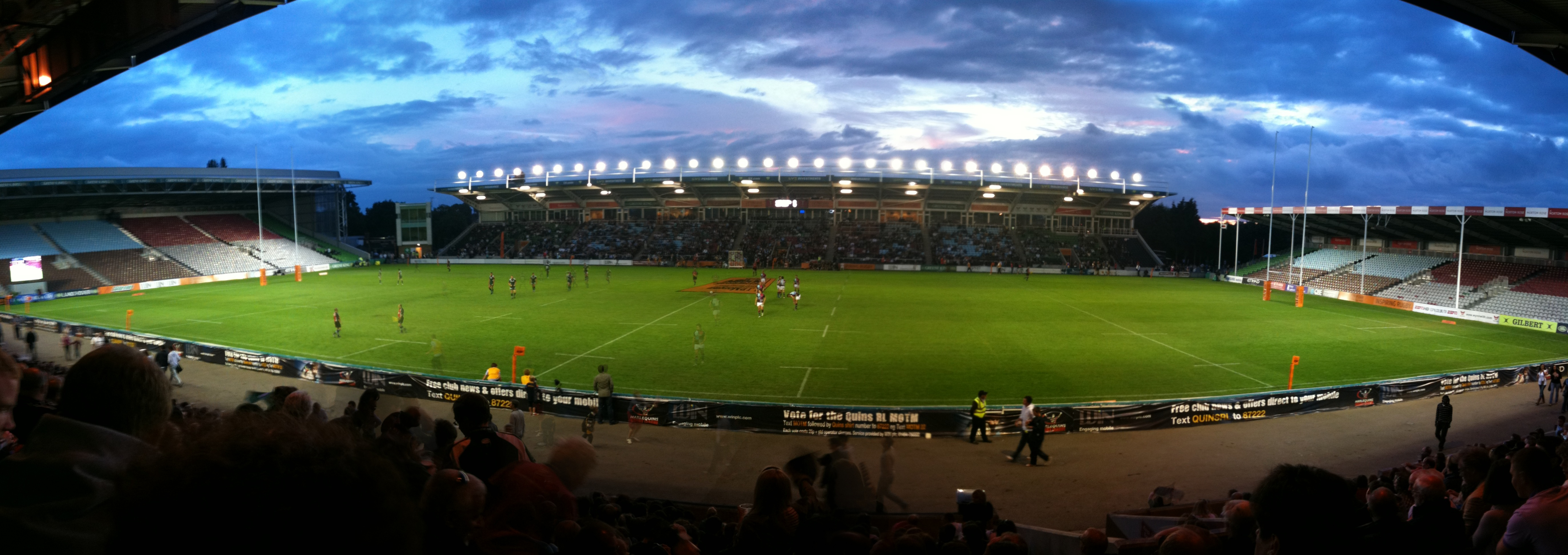

=== The Valley: 1996 / 2000–2001 ===
Prior to the start of the first season of Super League in summer 1996, the Broncos agreed a ground share with Charlton Athletic at The Valley in south-east London. Here they drew their largest attendances since the Craven Cottage days. The Broncos later returned to the Valley for the second time in 2000, this time spending two seasons there.

=== Griffin Park: 2002–2006 ===
In 2002, London Broncos moved to Griffin Park to ground share with Brentford F.C. The club remained here until after the 2006 season. The Broncos had earlier played two Rugby League Championship matches at Griffin Park during the 1995–96 season.

=== The Hive: 2014–2015 ===
In 2014, having changed their name back to London Broncos, the club moved away from The Stoop and looked for a permanent stay elsewhere. They moved to Canons Park in north-west London where they agreed a ground share with Barnet F.C. at their new stadium, The Hive. The club spent two seasons there, during which time they were relegated from Super League for the first time.

The record crowd for the Broncos during 2014 was against Wigan Warriors when 2,013 attended The Hive.

The Broncos left The Hive at the end of the 2015 season.

=== Trailfinders Sports Club: 2016–2020, 2021 ===
Prior to the start of the 2016 season, the club moved to the Trailfinders Sports Ground in Ealing in west London to ground share with rugby union club, Ealing Trailfinders. The venue's main pitch is an artificial 3G surface.

The Broncos left the ground prior to the start of the 2021 season, with the RFL having confirmed that it would no longer be deemed as suitable for matches at Super League level.

=== The Rock: 2021 ===
In December 2020 the club announced that a move to Plough Lane, home of AFC Wimbledon was being sought. By the start of the 2021 season this move had not yet been formally agreed so arrangements were made for the opening games of 2021 to be played at The Rock, Roehampton, the home of Rosslyn Park F.C.

In February 2021 it was confirmed that the Broncos had reached a three-year deal with Richmond Athletic Association which would see the club's academy side and scholarship teams train and play matches at the Athletic Ground, Richmond.

=== Plough Lane: 2022 ===
In July 2021 it was confirmed that London Broncos would play their home games in 2022 at Plough Lane (known as The Cherry Red Records Stadium for sponsorship reasons).

== Other venues ==
The club has also played matches at one-off venues when the main ground was not available. Examples include Rodney Parade, Newport in 2000 and Talbot Athletic Ground in Aberavon in 2003.
