= Oksana Liaturynska =

Ukrainian poet and sculptor (1902–1970)

- Оксана Лятуринська
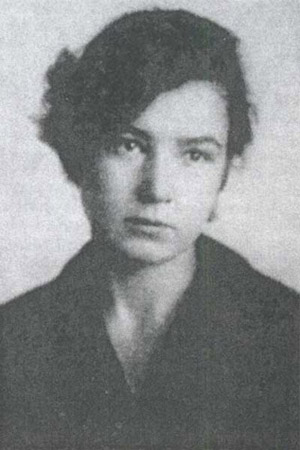
- Born: Oksana Zinaida Mykhailivna Liaturynska; February 1, 1902; Katerynivka, Russian Empire (now Ukraine)
- Died: June 13, 1970 (aged 68); Minneapolis, Minnesota
- Occupations: Artist, sculptor, writer, poet

Oksana Zinaida Mykhailivna Liaturynska (Note: Ukrainian: Оксана Зінаїда Михайлівна Лятуринська, romanized: Oksana Zinaida Mykhailivna Liaturynska) (February 1, 1902 – June 13, 1970) was an artist, sculptor, writer, poet and public figure. Liaturynska signed her works either by her own name or by pen names: Oksana Pechenih, Roksana Vyshnevetska and Yeronim.

== Biography ==
Oksana Liaturynska was born on 1 February 1902 in Katerynivka (Note: or in Lisky Farm (today Khomy village, Zbarazh district).) or in the hamlet of Lisky in the Volyn province of the Russian Empire (now the Ternopil region of Ukraine). Her father, Mykhailo Liaturynsky, served as an officer at the Russian border post near Staryi Oleksynets. Liaturynska's mother, Anna Verka, came from a family of German colonists. She had six sisters and brothers: Oleksandr, Antonina, Gnat, Ivan, Maria, and Fedir.

From the early 1920s, Liaturynska studied at the Ivan Steshenko Kremenets Private Ukrainian Grammar School. When she was 20, her father decided to arrange for her to marry a rich peasant but she didn't accept it and ran away from home to relatives who lived in the nearby village of Katerynivka. She emigrated at the age of 22 with the help of her relatives first to Germany, then to Czechoslovakia, and finally to the United States.

She began her literary career in Prague and was a member of a “Prague school” Vysnik group of émigré writers. She was actively involved in the social and cultural life of Ukrainian emigrants. There she met the emigrant poets Jevhen Malanjuk, Oleksa Stefanowytsch, Olena Teliha and Oleh Olzhych.

She studies at the Faculty of Philosophy of Charles University, at the Ukrainian Studio of Plastic Art, at the Czech High School of Art and Industry, where she regularly attended sculpture classes with Czech professors Blažek and Waxman, and which she graduated in 1934. She ran her own studio in Prague for ten years, and many of her surviving artworks are found in this city.

In 1945, she found herself in a camp for displaced persons in Aschaffenburg, Germany, then in 1949 in exile in the United States. With the help of the Ukrainian Women's Union she settled in Minneapolis.

Liaturynska died of cancer in Minneapolis in 1970. An urn with her ashes is buried in the Ukrainian Orthodox Cemetery in Bound Brook, New Jersey.

Liaturynska remained single; her health was always very poor and she increasingly lost her sense of hearing. This further isolated her from her surroundings and prevented her from entering mainstream American society, a move which might have secured financial means for her existence.

— Helene N. Turkewicz-Sanko (John Carroll University)

== Works ==
Liaturynska repeatedly turned to Ukrainian folk tradition both in her literature and her artwork.

She took part in a number of exhibitions in London, Paris, and Berlin and gained recognition as a master of sculptural portraits. She created the monument to the fallen soldiers of the Ukrainian People's Republic in Pardubice (1932) and the busts of Taras Shevchenko, Tomáš Masaryk, Symon Petliura and Yevhen Konovalets. Several gravestones made by Liaturynska can be seen in Prague cemeteries. In 1939 Liaturynska designed the gravestone of Konovalets with the help of Robert Lisovskyi.

She painted portraits with pencil and charcoal, rarely with a pen and hardly ever used paint. She also worked in ceramics, made colourful and original dolls and Pysanky (Easter eggs).

Liaturynska also wrote poetry, starting as a teenager in 1917. She began to publish them in 1931 and her poems were published in many periodicals, making her very popular. In 1938, a series of her poems were collected in a book called Husla (a multi-string musical instrument) and in 1941 a second book, Kniazha emal’ (Princely Enamel), was published. In 1956, these two collections and the book Veselka (Rainbow) were published together in one volume.

In 1946, she published Materynky (Wild Thyme), a book of autobiographical children's stories. In 1956, Bedryk (An Epiphany Carol) was a collection of poems for children. The latter two books were illustrated by the author. Liaturynska also participated in the activities of the Association of Ukrainian Writers “Word” (“Slovo”).

The book Iahilka (A Spring Song, 1971) was published posthumously.

== Commemoration ==
A monument to Liaturynska was unveiled in 2002 in Khomy hamlet in honor of the 100th anniversary of her birth, funded by the writer Gavril Chernykhivsky, the family, the Zbarazh district community, and the Ternopil Writers' Union.

== See also ==
- Ukrainian literature
- Ukrainian folklore
- Pysanky
