= Robert Lisovskyi =

Ukrainian artist (1893–1982)

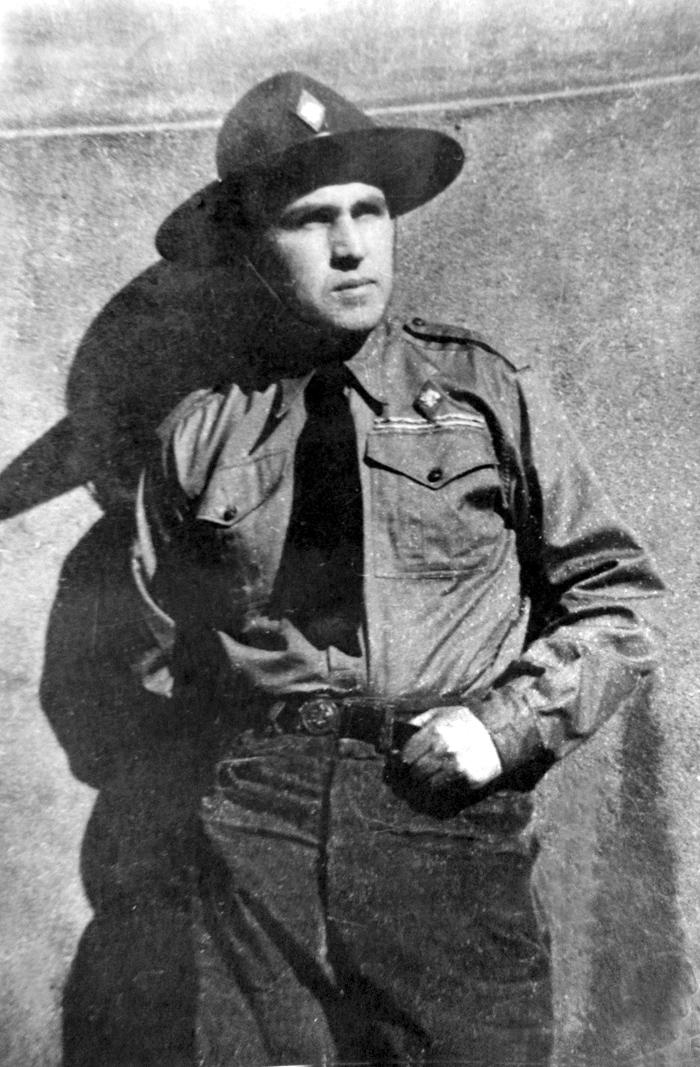
Robert Lisovsky

Organization of Ukrainian Nationalists emblem

Ukrainian scouting organization Plast

Robert Antonovych Lisovskyi (Ukrainian: Роберт Антонович Лісовський; 29 December 1893 – 28 December 1982) was a Ukrainian artist and graphic designer, a follower of Mykhailo Boychuk and Heorhiy Narbut. He specialized in various forms of graphic arts, particularly printmaking, book illustration, decorative and applied arts, scenography, and design.

The artist is known for his logo designs of Organization of Ukrainian Nationalists and Lufthansa's crane.

Lisovskyi was the head of the Association of Ukrainians in Great Britain.

== Biography ==
Lisovsky was born in a family of the director of mechanical shops in Kamianske. His mother, Julia von Ander, was of German descent. Robert was also baptized as Evangelical Lutheran. His elementary education, Lisovsky received in a local German school.

In 1906, Lisovsky attended Hohol Arts School in Myrhorod, where he received instructions from such artists as Opanas Slastion and Latvian Rūdolfs Pelše (1880 — 1942). Later, he studied at the Murashko Drawing School in Kiev (director Mykola Murashko) along with Vasyl Sedlyar, Anatol Petrytsky, Pavlo Kovzhun, and others. After that, Lisovsky studied at the Ukrainian State Academy of Arts in Kyiv, being taught by Mykhailo Boychuk and Heorhiy Narbut.

Exhibition of his works, Lisovsky started in 1914. In 1919, he became a member of "Musegetes" literary and art association and worked on decorations for the play "Romeo and Juliet" for the "Molodyi Teatr" (Young Theatre). Among his earlier book illustrations are a poem collection cover of M.Mocharovskyi "Above the field of curse, a love is sobbing" and a draft to a poem collection cover of Pavlo Tychyna "Sunny clarinets" (last one never was realized).

Lisovskyi also had a beautiful voice and, for some time, studied at the conservatorium of Professor Olena Muravyova and sang in the choir of the academic community.

In 1925 in Lviv he married Ukrainian composer Stefania Turkewich.

In 1939 Lisovskyi and Oksana Liaturynska designed the gravestone of interwar period Organisation of Ukrainian Nationalists leader Yevhen Konovalets.

In 1976, Lisovskyi emigrated to Geneva, where he lived until his death.
