= Ukrainians in the United Kingdom =

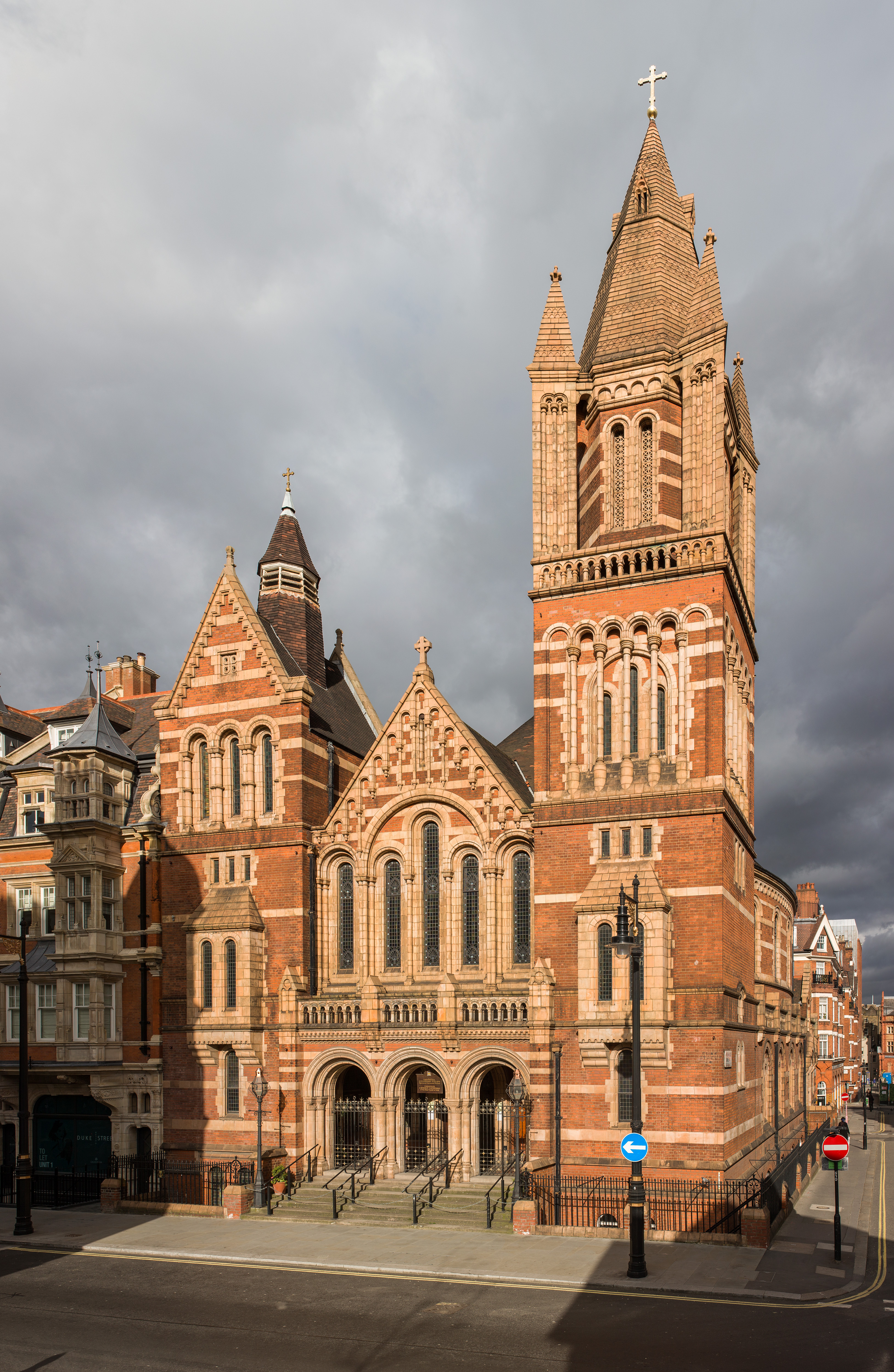
- Ukrainian Catholic Cathedral in London

Total population
- Ukrainian nationals 17,000 (2020 ONS estimate); Ukrainian-born residents 32,000 (2020 ONS estimate)

Languages
- English, Ukrainian, Russian

Religion
- Christianity (mostly Ukrainian Orthodox or Ukrainian Catholic), Judaism

Related ethnic groups
- Ukrainian Americans

The first Ukrainians to settle in the United Kingdom arrived in the early 20th century just prior to the outbreak of World War I, settling in small pockets in the UK's largest cities. Following World War II, about 35,000 Ukrainians arrived in the country, aided by the implementation of the European Voluntary Worker (EVW) scheme. A second wave of immigration followed the 1991 dissolution of the Soviet Union and Ukraine's independence. The number of Ukrainian-born citizens residing in the UK increased dramatically following Russia's invasion of Ukraine in February 2022; the UK has issued 260,800 visas to Ukrainian refugees as of July 2024.

== History ==
=== Early 20th century ===
Ukrainians began emigrating out of Galicia, located in modern-day western Ukraine, around the turn of the 20th century, fleeing poverty and overcrowding. While most chose to settle in North and South America, some arrived in the United Kingdom. The earliest Ukrainian migrants in the UK landed at Liverpool before deciding to settle in Manchester. By the outbreak of World War I in 1914, about 100 Ukrainian families were already living in Manchester and established a community centre there after the war. In London, an information centre was founded and the community there began to interact with the Manchester Ukrainians. Immigrants continued to arrive from the parts of Ukraine annexed into the Second Polish Republic following the unsuccessful Ukrainian War of Independence.

Following World War II, large numbers of Ukrainians, many of whom were displaced persons or prisoners of war (POWs), arrived in the UK. Most Ukrainians were integrated into the UK as European Voluntary Workers (EVWs). Ukrainian POWs were resettled in the UK and granted EVW status; although the first POWs began arriving as soon as the war ended, those whom surrendered and were captured by the UK itself in May 1945 were subsequently resettled in the country in March 1947. Some worked in the mills of Lancashire and in the greenhouses of the Lea Valley. After a short stay in a transit camp in East Anglia, many individuals entered a displaced persons camp in Newgate Street Village in Hertfordshire. As many as a quarter of all Ukrainian EVWs were women in the healthcare and textile industries. Migrants on this scheme, as well as their dependents, were allowed to settle permanently in the UK after four years and apply for citizenship.

The Association of Ukrainians in Great Britain (AUGB) was established in the post-war years to support and deliver mutual aid to the Ukrainian diaspora in the UK and also focused on furthering cultural exchange and connection. In 1949, the AUGB bought the Sydenhurst residential home, which housed and supported disabled Ukrainian veterans who struggled to find work.

Geographers Graham Smith and Peter Jackson suggest that 35,000 Ukrainians arrived after World War II, and that by the late 1950s there were 70 established Ukrainian communities in Britain, "the largest in Bradford, Nottingham, Manchester and Coventry". Between 1946 and 1949, the 29,250 Ukrainians who arrived under the EVW scheme made up the largest national group—32%—of the EVW workforce. By the late 1940s, over 10,000 Ukrainians had settled in Manchester alone. After the founding of the AUGB, London became the largest population hub for Ukrainians in the UK.

=== Post-Ukrainian independence ===
Due to the political situation between the UK and the Soviet Union during the post-war years, Ukrainian migration stopped until the dissolution of the Soviet Union and the granting of Ukraine's independence in 1991, which sparked a second wave of immigration. Approximately 16,000 Ukrainians arrived in the UK during this period; however, immigration from Ukraine was outpaced by other nations. Some of these new arrivals joined existing communities, causing the diaspora's institutions to expand to include new immigrants as well as the descendants of the post-World War II immigrants; however, many did not interact with the AUGB and other community centres beyond passing involvement, preferring instead to create smaller networks of personal relationships. However, protests at the Ukrainian Embassy in London in support of the Orange Revolution in 2004 and 2005 were well-attended, particularly by new immigrants.

=== Russian invasion of Ukraine ===
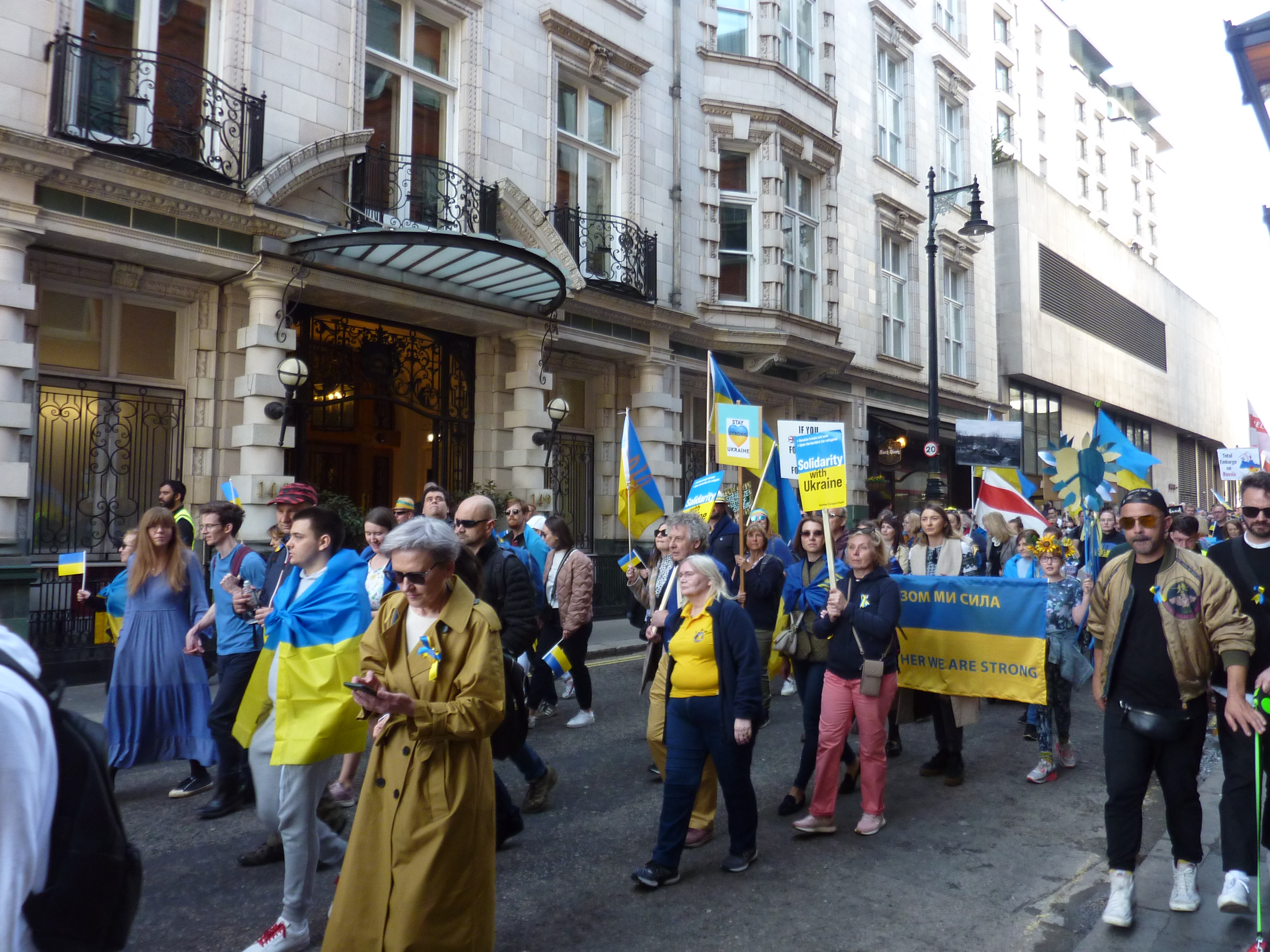
Anti-war protests in Bristol, 2022

During the 2022 Russian invasion of Ukraine, Ukrainians living in the UK have organised demonstrations to demand the British government introduce sanctions against Russia and take action against Russian oligarchs with financial and political links to the UK. Some of the protest organisers have criticised the government's Police, Crime, Sentencing and Courts Bill, which proposes to place new restrictions on protests and public assembly, accusing it of "hypocrisy for pushing through new anti-protest measures while criticising Russia for silencing anti-war demonstrations".

As of 16 July 2024, the United Kingdom had issued 260,800 visas to Ukrainians as a result of Russia's invasion, from a total of 342,000 applications received.

== Population ==
The 2001 Census recorded 11,913 people born in Ukraine resident in the UK. Most of these people—those who had arrived following World War II—were in their sixties or seventies; the second-largest group was of younger migrants who had likely arrived following Ukrainian independence. In 2005, the International Organization for Migration estimated that there were about 100,000 Ukrainians, Ukrainian descendants and Ukrainian speakers in the UK; however, this number may be an overestimate.

The 2011 UK Census recorded 20,320 Ukrainian-born residents in England, 380 in Wales, 838 in Scotland, and 245 in Northern Ireland.

The Office for National Statistics estimates that in 2020, 32,000 people born in Ukraine were resident in the UK. The number of Ukrainian nationals was estimated at 17,000.

== Religion ==
Most of the present Ukrainian diaspora in the UK are members of the Ukrainian Orthodox Church. A large number of Ukrainians living in Britain are Ukrainian Catholics, under the jurisdiction of the Apostolic Exarchate for Ukrainians in Great Britain, whilst smaller numbers are Jews and Muslims.

== Notable Britons with Ukrainian ancestry ==
Name	Occupation
Elena Baltacha	tennis player
Sergei Baltacha Jr.	footballer
Lew Grade	showbusiness impresario and television company executive
Michael Grade	chief-executive of ITV, former chairman of the BBC
Alexander Temerko	businessman
Marina Lewycka	novelist
Volodymyr Luciv	musician, bandurist and famous tenor in the 1950s through to the 1990s
Gerry Luczka	Football coach and manager
Anastasia Martin	actress
Sergei Pavlenko	portrait painter
Mark Pougatch	broadcast sports journalist, BBC
Peter Solowka	musician, guitarist with The Ukrainians and formerly The Wedding Present
Stepan Pasicznyk	musician, accordionist formerly with The Ukrainians original line up.
Zoë Wanamaker	US born actress, raised in Britain of Ukrainian and Russian descent

== See also ==
- Ukraine – United Kingdom relations
- Ukrainian Youth Association Great Britain, a scouting organization
- Ukrainian Americans
- Ukrainian Canadians
- Ukrainian diaspora
- Immigration to the United Kingdom
