= Grosvenor Vale =

Football stadium in Ruislip, London, England

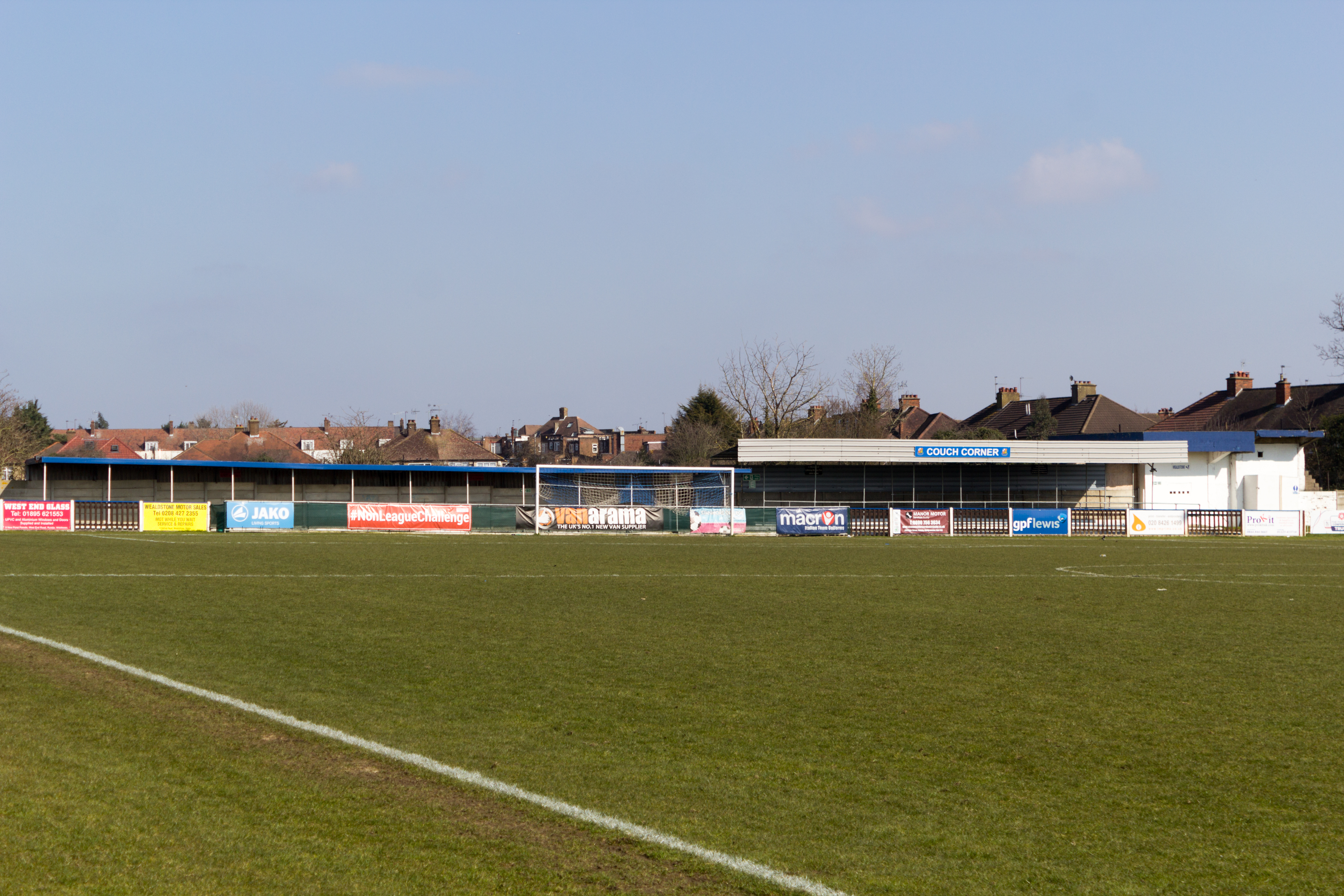
- Interactive map of Grosvenor Vale
- Location: Grosvenor Vale, Ruislip, England
- Coordinates: 51.5694°N 0.4166°W
- Owner: KSIMC
- Capacity: 4,085 (709 seated)
- Surface: Grass
- Record attendance: 4,000 (vs Marine 28 March 2026)
- Public transit: Ruislip and Ruislip Manor

Construction
- Opened: 1947

Tenants
- Wealdstone F.C. (2008-); Watford F.C. Women (2022-2025); Ruislip Manor F.C. (1947-2007)

Grosvenor Vale (also simply known as The Vale) is a football stadium in Ruislip, Greater London, England. It is the home ground of Wealdstone F.C. The current capacity of the stadium is 4,085.

== History ==
The ground was first opened in 1947 to house Ruislip Manor FC, who played there until 2008 when the football club collapsed due to financial difficulties. The lease for the site was then purchased by Wealdstone F.C. who had ground shared with other clubs for 17 years after leaving their Lower Mead stadium in Harrow in 1991. Since then, beginning with supporter-led efforts, the site has been slowly improved and expanded as Wealdstone progressed back up the non-league pyramid, culminating with promotion to the National League in 2020.

In the summer of 2022 Watford F.C. Women agreed to play the upcoming season at Grosvenor Vale. The team stayed until the end of the 2024/25 campaign and then returned to its previous home in Kings Langley.
