= Khomy =

Rural locality in Ternopil Oblast, Ukraine

Khomy Хоми
- Location in Ternopil Oblast
- Coordinates: 49°47′29″N 25°36′1″E
- Country: Ukraine
- Oblast: Ternopil Oblast
- Raion: Ternopil Raion
- Hromada: Zbarazh urban hromada
- Time zone: UTC+2 (EET)
  - Summer (DST): UTC+3 (EEST)
- Postal code: 47332

Khomy (Ukrainian: Хоми) is a village in the Zbarazh urban hromada of the Ternopil Raion of Ternopil Oblast in Ukraine.

== History ==
The village has been known from the late 19th century.

After the liquidation of the Zbarazh Raion on 19 July 2020, the village became part of the Ternopil Raion.

== Notable residents ==
- Oksana Liaturynska (1902–1970, khutir Lis), Ukrainian artist, sculptor, writer, poet and public figure

== Sources ==
- (in Ukrainian) Ковальков Ю., Новосядла Н., Хоми // Ternopil Encyclopedic Dictionary: in 4 v. / editorial board: H. Yavorskyi and other, Ternopil: "Zbruch", 2008, V. 3: П—Я, S. 555. — ISBN 978-966-528-279-2.
