= Katerynivka, Ternopil Oblast =

Katerynivka Катеринівка Katerburg
- Village
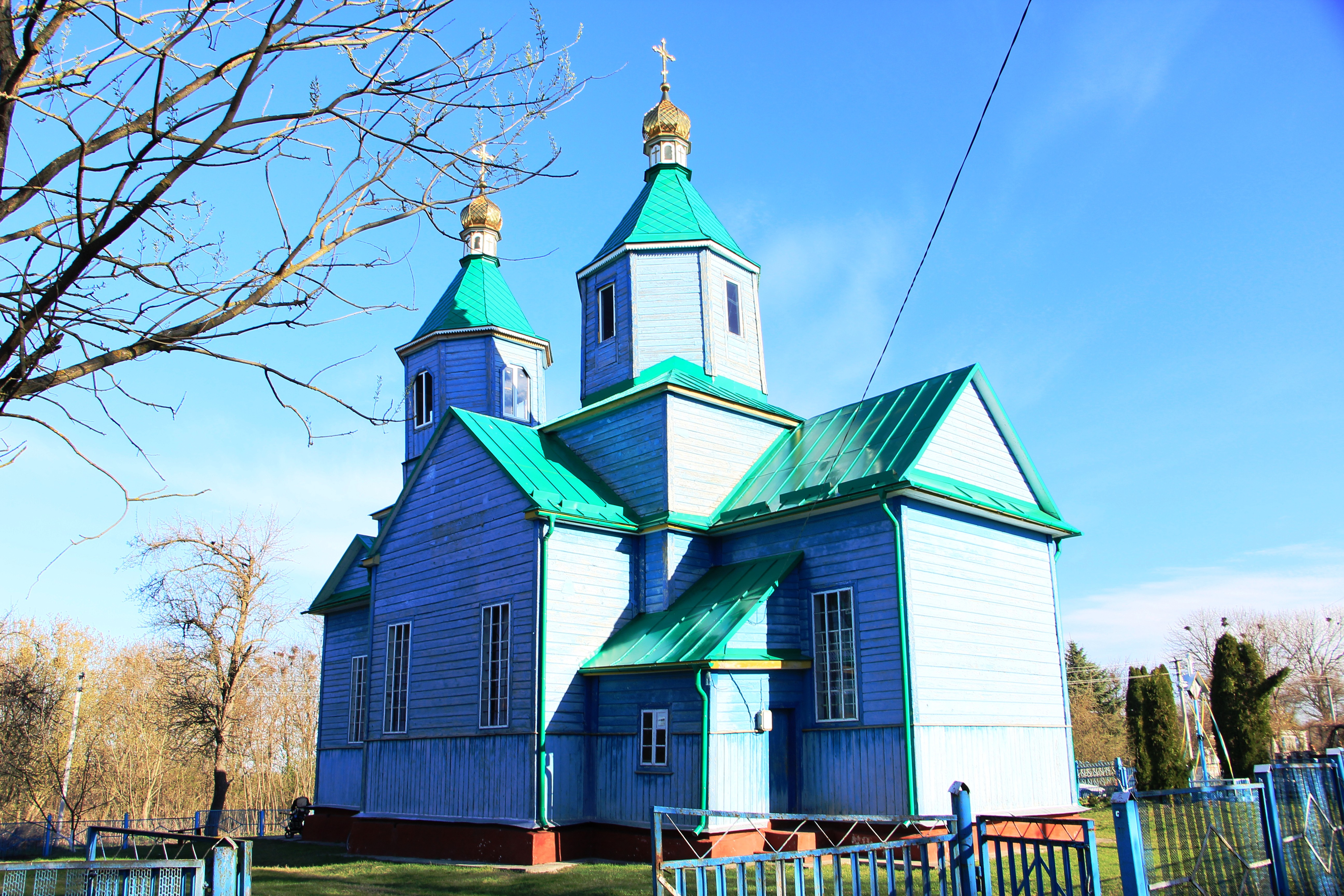
- Greek Catholic church

- Location within Ternopil Oblast Location within Ukraine
- Coordinates: 50°0′21″N 25°52′51″E
- Country: Ukraine
- Oblast: Ternopil
- Raion: Kremenets
- First mentioned: 1421
- Town rights: 18th century
- Demoted to village: 1944
- Founder: Józef Plater

Area
  - Total: 2.75 km^{2} (1.06 sq mi)

Population (2001)
  - Total: 391
  - Density: 142/km^{2} (368/sq mi)
- Postal code: 47041
- Area code: +380 (3546)

Katerynivka (Ukrainian: Катеринівка), until 1944 Katerburg (Ukrainian: Катербург) is a village and a former town in Western Ukraine. Administratively part of Kremenets Raion of the Ternopil Oblast, the village has 391 inhabitants. Katerynivka belongs to Kremenets urban hromada, one of the hromadas of Ukraine.

Initially founded in the Middle Ages as a village, the settlement was first mentioned in 1421. Throughout the ages the village bore the name of Wierzbica. The village featured a Catholic church founded by Count Plater in 1692 or 1700. In the 18th century the village's owner, Józef Plater, the castellan of Troki, turned it into a small town and renamed to Katrynburg in honour of his wife, Katarzyna Plater (née Sosnowska or Sobieska, sources differ). The name was soon shortened to Katerburg and remained in use until 1944. With time the town passed into the hands of the Ożarowski family. Between 1856 and 1877 (Mieczysław Orłowicz cites 1854–1897) Countess Cecylia Ożarowska erected a new church to replace the old one. After the January Uprising the town was confiscated from the Plater family and donated to Russian general Nikolay Bobrikov. In 1890 the church was also confiscated by the tsarist authorities and donated to a newly established Orthodox community, while the Catholic parish dissolved.

In the 19th century the town was primarily Jewish. According to 1870 data, the town had 106 houses and 815 inhabitants, 92 percent of them of Jewish ancestry. Soon after Poland regained its independence in 1918 the town of Katerburg was attached to powiat of Krzemieniec and since 1 October 1933 became a seat of a separate municipality. In 1920 the town's church was reclaimed by the Catholics. By 1929 the town had roughly 1000 inhabitants.

Following the outbreak of World War II the town was captured by the Red Army in accordance with the Molotov–Ribbentrop Pact. In January 1940 the village of Katerburg became an administrative center of raion and in October of that year its seat was moved to a nearby town of Dederkały (modern Velyki Dederkaly). After the end of Nazi-Soviet cooperation and the outbreak of hostilities between Germany and the Soviet Union, the town was soon captured by the Wehrmacht. Roughly 400 of the town's inhabitants were rushed into a small ghetto created in the town by the Germans. The ghetto was liquidated on 10 August 1942: officers of the Sicherheitsdienst aided by military police and Ukrainian militias mass murdered 312 Polish citizens, most of them of Jewish ancestry. Several dozen people had died before that date of hunger and diseases. Another mass murder took place on 7–8 May 1943, when Ukrainian nationalists murdered 28 Poles, 10 Jews and 2 mixed Polish-Ukrainian families as part of their widespread massacres of Poles in Volhynia and Eastern Galicia. The remaining Poles fled and the town remained almost completely deserted for the remainder of World War II.

After the war the town was permanently annexed by the Soviet Union to the Ukrainian SSR, renamed to Katerynivka and repopulated, mostly with ethnic Ukrainians, who now constitute 99.49 percent of its 391 inhabitants (according to Ukrainian census of 5 December 2001). The church was demolished and a small hospital was erected in its place. Likewise the local cemeteries were demolished and turned into an open field and a garbage dump. Following the dissolution of the Soviet Union in 1992, it is a part of independent Ukraine.
