= Sosnowski =

Sosnowski (feminine: Sosnowska; plural: Sosnowscy) is a Polish surname. It is related to the following surnames in other languages:

Language	Masculine	Feminine
Polish	Sosnowski	Sosnowska
Belarusian (Romanization)	Сасноўскі (Sasnoŭski, Sasnowski)	Сасноўская (Sasnoŭskaja, Sasnouskaya, Sasnouskaia)
Lithuanian	Sasnauskas	Sasnauskienė (married); Sasnauskaitė (unmarried)
Romanian	Sosnovschi	
Russian (Romanization)	Сосновский (Sosnovskiy, Sosnovsky)	Сосновская (Sosnovskaya, Sosnovskaia)
Ukrainian (Romanization)	Сосновський (Sosnovskyi, Sosnovskyy)	Сосновська (Sosnovska)
Other	Sosnowsky	

== People ==
- Albert Sosnowski (born 1979), Polish boxer
- Antoni Sosnowski (born 1946), Polish politician
- Czesław Sosnowski (1867–1916), Lithuanian composer
- David Sosnowski (born 1959), American novelist
- Dmitrii Ivanovich Sosnowsky (1886–1953), Soviet botanist
- Hélène Sosnowska (1864–1942) Polish-French gynaecologist
- Jerzy Sosnowski (1896–c. 1944), Polish spy
- Joe Sosnowski (born 1977), American politician
- John B. Sosnowski (1883–1968), American politician
- Józef Sylwester Sosnowski (died 1783), Polish nobleman
- Kajetan Sosnowski (1913–1987), Polish painter
- Kazimierz Sosnkowski (1885–1969), Polish independence fighter, general, diplomat, and architect
- Lucjan Sosnowski (1934–1999), Polish wrestler
- Monika Sosnowska (born 1971), Polish painter
- Nydia de Sosnowska, actress and wife of Harry Bruno
- Oskar Sosnowski (1880–1939), Polish architect
- Sophie Sosnowski (1809–1899), American educator
- V. Susan Sosnowski (born 1955), American politician
- Zbigniew Sosnowski (born 1963), Polish politician
- Zenon Sosnowski (1931–2014), Polish medical researcher and lecturer
