= Lower Mead =

Football stadium in Harrow, London, England

- Interactive map of Lower Mead
- Location: Harrow, England
- Coordinates: 51.5858°N 0.3340°W
- Surface: Grass

Construction
- Opened: 1922
- Closed: Summer 1991
- Demolished: June 1991

Tenant
- Wealdstone F.C. (1922–1991)

Lower Mead was a football stadium in Harrow, North West London. It was the home ground of Wealdstone Football Club for nearly 70 years from 1922 until 1991, after which it was demolished.

Construction of the stadium was completed in time for the start of the 1922/23 season, the club having previously played at a number of local grounds. Located on Station Road, Harrow, at the northern end of Harrow town centre and just south of the district of Wealdstone, the stadium was situated behind a row of shops and a cinema (known today as the Safari Cinema), and was flanked along its northern perimeter by residential flats built in High Mead in the mid-1930s.

The record crowd attendance at Lower Mead was 13,504 on 5th March 1949 for a FA Amateur Cup 4th Round Replay versus Leytonstone F.C.

The stadium consisted of a small main stand to the south, purchased in 1928 from Summerstown F.C.'s ground in Earlsfield, which contained the players' and officials' dressing rooms and was the only seated part of the stadium, and which straddled the half-way line, with uncovered terracing to either side of it. To the west was a covered terracing known as the Elmslie End, named in honour of a club official. Uncovered terracing ran the entire length of the pitch on the north side, created just after the second world war when the land behind it was sold for housing. To the east was a narrow covered terrace known as the Cinema End. The clubhouse and supporters' bar stood immediately adjacent to the stadium on the southern side. There were minimal car or coach parking facilities.

Following financial mismanagement by the then owner of the club, at the end of the 1990/91 season Wealdstone were forced to sell the freehold of Lower Mead to Tesco in order to stay in existence. The company handling the sale of Lower Mead then went into liquidation and, after protracted legal proceedings, the club eventually received only a very small percentage of the sum that Tesco had paid for the site. This left the club not only homeless but also struggling financially for many years, necessitating various groundshare agreements; initially with Watford F.C., followed by Yeading F.C., Edgware Town F.C. and then finally Northwood F.C. before the club finally obtained a permanent home ground of their own in 2008 called Grosvenor Vale, in Ruislip, only 3 miles away from Lower Mead.

Demolition of Lower Mead stadium began in June 1991 and a large Tesco supermarket was built on the site, which operates to this day. A decorative weather vane on the roof of the store depicts a footballing scene, as a memorial of the site's previous use.

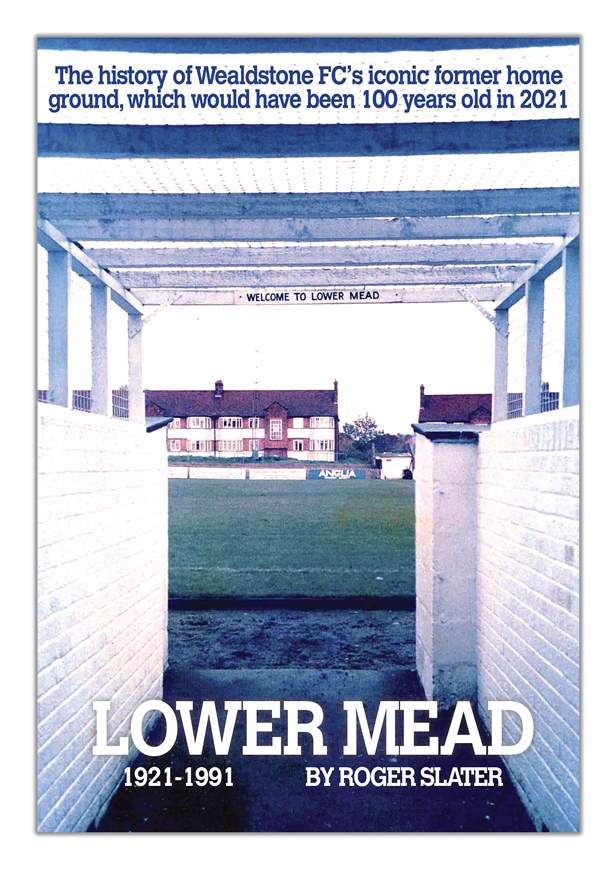

To commemorate what would have been the centenary of the ground, in 2021 a booklet has been produced by Wealdstone FC supporters which records the growth and development of Lower Mead during its use. It is available from the WFCSC Megastore online.
