= 1993–94 FA Cup qualifying rounds =

1993-94 FA Cup qualifying rounds
Tournament details
- Country: England; Wales

The 1993–94 FA Cup qualifying rounds opened the 113th season of competition in England for 'The Football Association Challenge Cup' (FA Cup), the world's oldest association football single knockout competition. A total of 539 clubs were accepted for the competition, down 22 from the previous season's 561.

The large number of clubs entering the tournament from lower down (Levels 5 through 8) in the English football pyramid meant that the competition started with five rounds of preliminary (1) and qualifying (4) knockouts for these non-League teams. The 28 winning teams from Fourth round Qualifying progressed to the First round proper, where League teams tiered at Levels 3 and 4 entered the competition.

== Calendar ==
Round	Start date	New Entries	Clubs
Preliminary round	Saturday 28 August 1993	270	539 → 404
First qualifying round	Saturday 11 September 1993	153	404 → 260
Second qualifying round	Saturday 25 September 1993	none	260 → 188
Third qualifying round	Saturday 9 October 1993	none	188 → 152
Fourth qualifying round	Saturday 23 October 1993	20	152 → 124
First round proper	Saturday 13 November 1993	52	124 → 84
Second round	Saturday 4 December 1993	none	84 → 64
Third round	Saturday 8 January 1994	44	64 → 32
Fourth round	Saturday 29 January 1994	none	32 → 16
Fifth round	Saturday 19 February 1994	none	16 → 8
Sixth round	Saturday 12 March 1994	none	8 → 4
Semi-finals	Saturday 9 April 1994	none	4 → 2
Final	Saturday 14 May 1994	none	2 → 1

== Preliminary round ==
=== Ties ===
Tie	Home team	Score	Away team
1	A F C Totton	1-1	Ryde Sports
2	Alfreton Town	3-2	Armthorpe Welfare
3	Armitage '90	1-0	Banbury United
4	Atherton Laburnum Rovers	1-1	Blackpool Rovers
5	Barnstaple Town	4-0	Exmouth Town
6	Bedfont w/o-scr Beckenham Town		
7	Belper Town	1-2	Bamber Bridge
8	Bideford	2-2	Chippenham Town
9	Biggleswade Town	0-3	Barton Rovers
10	Billericay Town	5-2	Bourne Town
11	Billingham Synthonia	3-0	Darlington Cleveland Social
12	Billingham Town	1-1	Alnwick Town
13	Bilston Town	0-2	Bridgnorth Town
14	Bishop's Stortford	4-0	Boston
15	Blidworth Welfare	1-4	Arnold Town
16	Boldmere St Michaels	2-0	Blakenall
17	Bournemouth	0-1	Brockenhurst
18	Bracknell Town	3-3	Bognor Regis Town
19	Bridport	4-0	Bristol Manor Farm
20	Brightlingsea United	1-3	Canvey Island
21	Brook House	2-1	Boreham Wood
22	Burgess Hill Town	3-0	Arundel
23	Bury Town	1-2	Burnham Ramblers
24	Caernarfon Town	0-0	Burscough
25	Chasetown	2-1	Barwell
26	Chatteris Town	2-3	Cornard United
27	Clapton	1-1	Cheshunt
28	Clitheroe	1-0	Congleton Town
29	Consett	5-2	Willington
30	Cove	2-1	Walton & Hersham
31	Croydon	5-0	Corinthian Casuals
32	Daventry Town	0-3	Oldbury United
33	Dawlish Town	0-12	Taunton Town
34	Desborough Town	1-0	Evesham United
35	Dudley Town	2-1	Eastwood Hanley
36	Dunstable	2-2	Collier Row
37	Eastbourne United	5-1	Egham Town
38	Eccleshill United	2-2	Denaby United
39	Edgware Town	3-0	Feltham & Hounslow Borough
40	Elmore	2-1	Devizes Town
41	Erith & Belvedere	2-1	Godalming & Guildford
42	Esh Winning	0-1	Gretna
43	Evenwood Town	3-1	Ferryhill Athletic
44	Fakenham Town	2-2	Great Yarmouth Town
45	Fareham Town	1-1	Eastleigh
46	Faversham Town	3-0	Fisher '93 (Tie awarded to Fisher '93)
47	Felixstowe Town	1-1	Gorleston
48	Flixton	2-0	Farsley Celtic
49	Ford United	1-1	Haringey Borough
50	Frome Town	3-3	Glastonbury
51	Glasshoughton Welfare	0-2	Glossop North End
52	Gosport Borough	0-3	Hungerford Town
53	Great Harwood Town	1-5	Guiseley
54	Hailsham Town	1-4	Epsom & Ewell
55	Halesowen Harriers	2-4	Leicester United
56	Hanwell Town	1-2	Harefield United
57	Harrogate Town	5-2	Peterlee Newtown
58	Haverhill Rovers	1-2	Eynesbury Rovers
59	Hertford Town	0-1	Kempston Rovers
60	Hinckley Town	2-1	Hinckley Athletic
61	Histon	0-9	Heybridge Swifts
62	Horden Colliery Welfare	4-4	Hebburn
63	Hornchurch	1-1	Hoddesdon Town
64	Horsham	1-2	Herne Bay
65	Horsham Y M C A	2-2	Croydon Athletic
66	Hucknall Town	4-0	Chadderton
67	Immingham Town	1-3	Ilkeston Town
68	Lancaster City	3-1	Whickham
69	Langford	2-1	Leighton Town
70	Langney Sports	2-1	Malden Vale
71	Lewes	3-1	Littlehampton Town
72	Lincoln United	4-2	Mossley
73	Long Buckby	2-2	Redditch United
74	Lowestoft Town	3-2	Tamworth
75	Lye Town	1-2	Northampton Spencer
76	Maine Road	0-1	Maltby Miners Welfare
77	March Town United	3-2	Saffron Walden Town
78	Melksham Town	1-0	Falmouth Town
79	Merstham	1-4	Pagham
80	Mirrlees Blackstone	0-1	King's Lynn
81	Moreton Town	2-0	Minehead
82	Murton	3-2	Durham City
83	Newbury Town	6-1	Lancing
84	Newcastle Town	1-1	Ossett Albion
85	Northwood	3-0	Royston Town
86	Oakwood	1-1	Metropolitan Police
87	Odd Down	1-1	Ilfracombe Town
88	Oldham Town	1-3	North Ferriby United
89	Ossett Town	5-3	Harworth Colliery Institute
90	Oxford City	0-7	Newport I O W
91	Peacehaven & Telscombe	2-1	Fleet Town
92	Petersfield United scr-w/o Thame United		
93	Pickering Town	5-2	Penrith
94	Poole Town	5-0	Swanage Town & Herston
95	Portfield	1-0	Steyning Town
96	Racing Club Warwick	1-2	Pershore Town
97	Radcliffe Borough	1-3	Salford City
98	Rainham Town	1-5	Purfleet
99	Ramsgate	1-1	Selsey
100	Redhill	1-2	Ringmer
101	Rocester	0-1	Rushden & Diamonds
102	Rossendale United	3-0	Rossington Main
103	Rothwell Town	2-0	Rushall Olympic
104	Ruislip Manor	4-3	Letchworth Garden City
105	Ryhope Community Association	0-3	Prudhoe East End
106	Shildon w/o-scr South Shields		
107	Shoreham	0-2	Buckingham Town
108	Shortwood United	3-2	St Blazey
109	Skelmersdale United	0-1	Thackley
110	Southall	1-0	Ware
111	Southwick	2-1	Slade Green
112	Staines Town	1-0	Uxbridge
113	Stamford	4-1	Tiptree United
114	Stewart & Lloyds Corby	1-3	Stratford Town
115	Stocksbridge Park Steels	1-2	St Helens Town
116	Stourport Swifts	0-0	Stourbridge
117	Sudbury Town	4-1	Stowmarket Town
118	Tilbury	1-1	Tring Town
119	Tonbridge	4-1	Whitehawk
120	Tooting & Mitcham United	7-0	Tunbridge Wells
121	Torrington	1-4	Yate Town
122	Tow Law Town	1-0	West Auckland Town
123	Walthamstow Pennant	2-3	Wingate & Finchley
124	Warrington Town	5-0	Bradford Park Avenue
125	Watton United	3-1	Barking
126	Wednesfield	1-0	Eastwood Town
127	West Bromwich Town	1-3	Willenhall Town
128	Weston Super Mare	6-1	Welton Rovers
129	Whyteleafe	5-1	Three Bridges
130	Wimborne Town	5-0	Westbury United
131	Windsor & Eton	1-4	Wick
132	Winterton Rangers	2-0	Prescot
133	Wisbech Town	3-1	Brimsdown Rovers
134	Workington	0-2	Crook Town
135	Yorkshire Amateur	2-1	Brandon United

=== Replays ===
Tie	Home team	Score	Away team
1	Ryde Sports	1-3	A F C Totton
4	Blackpool Rovers	1-6	Atherton Laburnum Rovers
8	Chippenham Town	3-0	Bideford
12	Alnwick Town	1-2	Billingham Town
18	Bognor Regis Town	5-0	Bracknell Town
24	Burscough	2-0	Caernarfon Town
27	Cheshunt	2-1	Clapton
36	Collier Row	0-1	Dunstable
38	Denaby United	2-1	Eccleshill United
44	Great Yarmouth Town	3-1	Fakenham Town
45	Eastleigh	4-1	Fareham Town
47	Gorleston	0-2	Felixstowe Town
49	Haringey Borough	2-0	Ford United
50	Glastonbury	0-1	Frome Town
62	Hebburn	2-1	Horden Colliery Welfare
63	Hoddesdon Town	0-3	Hornchurch
65	Croydon Athletic	5-2	Horsham Y M C A
73	Redditch United	3-1	Long Buckby
84	Ossett Albion	1-2	Newcastle Town
86	Metropolitan Police	3-1	Oakwood
87	Ilfracombe Town	2-2	Odd Down
99	Selsey	3-3	Ramsgate
116	Stourbridge	2-1	Stourport Swifts
118	Tring Town	0-4	Tilbury

=== 2nd replays ===
Tie	Home team	Score	Away team
87	Odd Down	1-0	Ilfracombe Town
99	Selsey	0-1	Ramsgate (Tie awarded to Selsey)

== 1st qualifying round ==
=== Ties ===
Tie	Home team	Score	Away team
1	Alfreton Town	2-3	Bamber Bridge
2	Armitage '90	3-0	Boldmere St Michaels
3	Arnold Town	1-3	Leek Town
4	Ashton United	3-0	Atherton Laburnum Rovers
5	Atherstone United	2-1	Hednesford Town
6	Baldock Town	6-0	Brook House
7	Banstead Athletic	0-3	Bognor Regis Town
8	Barrow	3-1	Guisborough Town
9	Barton Rovers	1-0	Arlesey Town
10	Bashley	2-1	Abingdon Town
11	Basildon United	1-1	Canvey Island
12	Bedfont	0-1	Canterbury City
13	Bedworth United	2-1	Bridgnorth Town
14	Billericay Town	1-1	Aveley
15	Billingham Town	0-2	Billingham Synthonia
16	Bishop Auckland	1-4	Netherfield
17	Bishop's Stortford	2-0	Burnham Ramblers
18	Bootle	5-1	Burscough
19	Boston United	1-1	Braintree Town
20	Bridlington Town	2-0	Frickley Athletic
21	Bridport	2-3	Elmore
22	Brockenhurst	1-4	Eastleigh
23	Bromley	3-1	Dulwich Hamlet
24	Bromsgrove Rovers	1-1	Gresley Rovers
25	Buckingham Town	0-1	Andover
26	Burgess Hill Town	0-1	Chatham Town
27	Burton Albion	2-1	Moor Green
28	Buxton	2-1	Gainsborough Trinity
29	Calne Town	5-1	Cove
30	Cambridge City	4-1	Berkhamsted Town
31	Carshalton Athletic	2-0	Havant Town
32	Chalfont St Peter	1-0	Dunstable
33	Chasetown	0-1	Solihull Borough
34	Chelmsford City	0-0	Newmarket Town
35	Chesham United	5-0	St Albans City
36	Cheshunt	0-2	Burnham
37	Chester-Le-Street Town	2-3	Consett
38	Chippenham Town	0-5	Weymouth
39	Chorley	3-1	Horwich R M I
40	Cinderford Town	1-1	Barnstaple Town
41	Clitheroe	2-2	Curzon Ashton
42	Colwyn Bay	4-1	Hyde United
43	Corby Town	4-0	Watton United
44	Corinthian	3-0	Croydon Athletic
45	Cornard United	0-1	Halstead Town
46	Croydon	4-1	Chipstead
47	Dagenham & Redbridge	1-0	Hitchin Town
48	Darwen	1-1	Flixton
49	Denaby United	0-4	Morecambe
50	Desborough Town	1-3	Raunds Town
51	Dorchester Town	1-0	Wokingham Town
52	Dorking	4-1	Worthing
53	Droylsden	1-1	Brigg Town
54	Dudley Town	1-1	Hinckley Town
55	Eastbourne United	0-2	Greenwich Borough
56	Edgware Town	2-0	Flackwell Heath
57	Enfield	4-1	Welling United
58	Erith & Belvedere	4-3	Deal Town
59	Evenwood Town	0-0	Hebburn
60	Felixstowe Town	1-1	Heybridge Swifts
61	Fisher '93	3-3	Herne Bay
62	Frome Town	0-0	Moreton Town
63	Gateshead	4-0	Blyth Spartans
64	Glossop North End	2-2	Goole Town
65	Gloucester City	1-2	Clevedon Town
66	Grantham Town	3-1	Leicester United
67	Gravesend & Northfleet	3-0	Epsom & Ewell
68	Grays Athletic	0-2	Yeading
69	Great Yarmouth Town	2-2	Hendon
70	Gretna	3-1	Seaham Red Star
71	Guiseley	3-1	Ilkeston Town
72	Harefield United	1-2	Hornchurch
73	Haringey Borough	0-0	Hampton
74	Harrogate Railway Athletic	1-2	Harrogate Town
75	Harrow Borough	3-1	Wealdstone
76	Harwich & Parkeston	4-1	Eynesbury Rovers
77	Hastings Town	1-5	Molesey
78	Heanor Town	1-2	Hucknall Town
79	Hemel Hempstead	2-1	Kempston Rovers
80	Hungerford Town	0-2	Newport I O W
81	King's Lynn	2-1	Sudbury Town
82	Kingsbury Town	2-1	Northwood
83	Kingstonian	2-1	Ashford Town (Kent)
84	Lancaster City	2-1	Stockton
85	Langford	1-4	Purfleet
86	Langney Sports	3-8	Leatherhead
87	Lewes	1-1	Metropolitan Police
88	Lincoln United	2-0	Nantwich Town
89	Liversedge	3-2	Newcastle Town
90	Lowestoft Town	1-0	Witham Town
91	Maidenhead United	1-2	Newbury Town
92	Maltby Miners Welfare	1-1	North Ferriby United
93	Mangotsfield United	3-0	Melksham Town
94	March Town United	3-6	Wivenhoe Town
95	Margate	6-0	Pagham
96	Newcastle Blue Star	3-2	Prudhoe East End
97	Northampton Spencer	0-1	Pershore Town
98	Northwich Victoria	2-2	Emley
99	Odd Down	2-2	Forest Green Rovers
100	Oldbury United	1-1	Pelsall Villa
101	Ossett Town	1-1	Winsford United
102	Paget Rangers	1-1	Redditch United
103	Paulton Rovers	2-1	Yate Town
104	Peacehaven & Telscombe	1-1	A F C Lymington
105	Pickering Town	0-2	Northallerton Town
106	Poole Town	0-0	Wimborne Town
107	Ringmer	1-0	Southwick
108	Rossendale United	1-1	St Helens Town
109	Rothwell Town	7-1	Stourbridge
110	Ruislip Manor	3-1	Leyton
111	Rushden & Diamonds	2-0	Sutton Coldfield Town
112	Salford City	1-1	Knowsley United
113	Sandwell Borough	5-0	Stratford Town
114	Selsey	2-3	Basingstoke Town
115	Sheffield	1-4	Thackley
116	Sheppey United	1-1	Portfield
117	Shildon	0-1	Easington Colliery
118	Shortwood United	1-3	Weston Super Mare
119	Sittingbourne	1-1	Dover Athletic
120	Spalding United	1-2	Stamford
121	Staines Town	1-2	Chertsey Town
122	Stalybridge Celtic	6-0	Fleetwood Town
123	Stevenage Borough	2-2	Wembley
124	Taunton Town	3-0	Saltash United
125	Telford United	4-0	Halesowen Town
126	Thame United	1-1	Witney Town
127	Thatcham Town	4-2	A F C Totton
128	Tilbury	3-2	Southall
129	Tonbridge	3-0	Bemerton Heath Harlequins
130	Tooting & Mitcham United	3-1	Wick
131	Tow Law Town	3-3	Murton
132	Trowbridge Town	1-1	Newport A F C
133	Viking Sports	3-0	Wingate & Finchley
134	Warrington Town	3-0	Matlock Town
135	Waterlooville	1-0	Salisbury City
136	Whitby Town	5-1	Crook Town
137	Whitley Bay	1-6	Spennymoor United
138	Whitstable Town	2-1	Whyteleafe
139	Willenhall Town	1-2	West Midlands Police
140	Winterton Rangers	1-7	Nuneaton Borough
141	Wisbech Town	1-1	East Thurrock United
142	Worcester City	1-1	Tiverton Town
143	Worksop Town	1-1	Wednesfield
144	Yorkshire Amateur	1-3	Dunston Federation Brewery

=== Replays ===
Tie	Home team	Score	Away team
11	Canvey Island	1-0	Basildon United
14	Braintree Town	1-2	Boston United
19	Gresley Rovers	0-1	Bromsgrove Rovers
24	Aveley	1-3	Burnham Ramblers
34	Newmarket Town	1-1	Chelmsford City
40	Barnstaple Town	3-1	Cinderford Town
41	Curzon Ashton	0-1	Clitheroe
48	Flixton	3-0	Darwen
53	Brigg Town	0-1	Droylsden
54	Hinckley Town	2-3	Dudley Town
59	Hebburn	0-3	Evenwood Town
60	Heybridge Swifts	5-1	Felixstowe Town
61	Herne Bay	3-2	Fisher '93
62	Moreton Town	1-0	Frome Town
64	Goole Town	1-0	Glossop North End
69	Hendon	4-2	Great Yarmouth Town
73	Hampton	1-2	Haringey Borough
87	Metropolitan Police	3-2	Lewes
92	North Ferriby United	4-2	Maltby Miners Welfare
98	Emley	2-0	Northwich Victoria
99	Forest Green Rovers	1-3	Odd Down
100	Pelsall Villa	3-0	Oldbury United
101	Winsford United	3-1	Ossett Town
102	Redditch United	2-1	Paget Rangers
104	A F C Lymington	2-0	Peacehaven & Telscombe
106	Wimborne Town	2-0	Poole Town
108	St Helens Town	1-0	Rossendale United
112	Knowsley United	6-0	Salford City
116	Portfield	0-3	Sheppey United
119	Dover Athletic	1-2	Sittingbourne
123	Wembley	1-1	Stevenage Borough
126	Witney Town	1-2	Thame United
131	Murton	1-2	Tow Law Town
132	Newport A F C	0-5	Trowbridge Town
141	East Thurrock United	1-0	Wisbech Town
142	Tiverton Town	4-2	Worcester City
143	Wednesfield	0-2	Worksop Town

=== 2nd replays ===
Tie	Home team	Score	Away team
34	Chelmsford City	3-0	Newmarket Town
123	Wembley	0-1	Stevenage Borough

== 2nd qualifying round ==
=== Ties ===
Tie	Home team	Score	Away team
1	A F C Lymington	0-1	Newport I O W
2	Andover	3-0	Eastleigh
3	Atherstone United	0-0	Redditch United
4	Barrow	6-1	Harrogate Town
5	Barton Rovers	1-2	Halstead Town
6	Bashley	3-1	Calne Town
7	Basingstoke Town	3-0	Ringmer
8	Billericay Town	1-3	Bishop's Stortford
9	Boston United	2-3	Canvey Island
10	Bridlington Town	2-1	Flixton
11	Bromley	0-3	Margate
12	Bromsgrove Rovers	2-0	Bedworth United
13	Burnham	1-3	Edgware Town
14	Burton Albion	3-2	Sandwell Borough
15	Buxton	2-0	Hucknall Town
16	Cambridge City	3-0	Harwich & Parkeston
17	Canterbury City	1-4	Chatham Town
18	Carshalton Athletic	5-1	Sheppey United
19	Chelmsford City	5-2	Stamford
20	Chertsey Town	2-0	Tilbury
21	Chesham United	5-0	Chalfont St Peter
22	Chorley	2-1	Liversedge
23	Clevedon Town	2-2	Barnstaple Town
24	Colwyn Bay	4-1	Thackley
25	Croydon	0-1	Greenwich Borough
26	Dagenham & Redbridge	2-1	Baldock Town
27	Dorchester Town	0-3	Newbury Town
28	Dorking	4-0	Whitstable Town
29	Droylsden	1-1	Worksop Town
30	Dunston Federation Brewery	1-1	Billingham Synthonia
31	Emley	2-0	Ashton United
32	Enfield	1-0	Hemel Hempstead
33	Erith & Belvedere	2-1	Herne Bay
34	Gateshead	3-1	Consett
35	Gretna	8-1	Evenwood Town
36	Haringey Borough	1-3	Hornchurch
37	Harrow Borough	6-0	Viking Sports
38	Hendon	5-2	Heybridge Swifts
39	Kingstonian	1-1	Bognor Regis Town
40	Knowsley United	2-1	St Helens Town
41	Lancaster City	3-2	Tow Law Town
42	Leatherhead	3-5	Metropolitan Police
43	Leek Town	5-3	Bamber Bridge
44	Lincoln United	1-5	North Ferriby United
45	Lowestoft Town	1-2	East Thurrock United
46	Molesey	2-0	Corinthian
47	Morecambe	3-0	Goole Town
48	Netherfield	3-2	Newcastle Blue Star
49	Northallerton Town	4-1	Easington Colliery
50	Nuneaton Borough	3-3	West Midlands Police
51	Odd Down	0-2	Moreton Town
52	Pelsall Villa	1-2	Pershore Town
53	Raunds Town	3-1	Dudley Town
54	Ruislip Manor	1-1	Purfleet
55	Rushden & Diamonds	1-1	Rothwell Town
56	Sittingbourne	0-2	Gravesend & Northfleet
57	Solihull Borough	2-2	Armitage '90
58	Spennymoor United	2-3	Whitby Town
59	Stalybridge Celtic	2-2	Bootle
60	Stevenage Borough	4-3	Corby Town
61	Taunton Town	2-4	Weston Super Mare
62	Telford United	2-2	Grantham Town
63	Thame United	2-3	Wimborne Town
64	Tiverton Town	2-1	Paulton Rovers
65	Tonbridge	0-2	Tooting & Mitcham United
66	Trowbridge Town	0-0	Mangotsfield United
67	Warrington Town	2-2	Clitheroe
68	Waterlooville	3-0	Thatcham Town
69	Weymouth	3-0	Elmore
70	Winsford United	2-1	Guiseley
71	Wivenhoe Town	2-2	King's Lynn
72	Yeading	5-2	Kingsbury Town

=== Replays ===
Tie	Home team	Score	Away team
3	Redditch United	1-1	Atherstone United
23	Barnstaple Town	2-1	Clevedon Town
29	Worksop Town	3-0	Droylsden
30	Billingham Synthonia	1-0	Dunston Federation Brewery
39	Bognor Regis Town	1-6	Kingstonian
50	West Midlands Police	0-3	Nuneaton Borough
54	Purfleet	1-0	Ruislip Manor
55	Rothwell Town	0-2	Rushden & Diamonds
57	Armitage '90	2-3	Solihull Borough
59	Bootle	1-3	Stalybridge Celtic
62	Grantham Town	1-3	Telford United
66	Mangotsfield United	2-2	Trowbridge Town
67	Clitheroe	0-2	Warrington Town
71	King's Lynn	1-4	Wivenhoe Town

=== 2nd replays ===
Tie	Home team	Score	Away team
3	Redditch United	1-3	Atherstone United
66	Trowbridge Town	2-3	Mangotsfield United

== 3rd qualifying round ==
=== Ties ===
Tie	Home team	Score	Away team
1	Andover	0-2	Bashley
2	Basingstoke Town	1-3	Carshalton Athletic
3	Billingham Synthonia	1-1	Gateshead
4	Bishop's Stortford	0-1	Canvey Island
5	Chatham Town	1-2	Kingstonian
6	Chertsey Town	1-3	Harrow Borough
7	East Thurrock United	1-5	Stevenage Borough
8	Edgware Town	1-2	Chesham United
9	Erith & Belvedere	0-1	Gravesend & Northfleet
10	Greenwich Borough	0-4	Molesey
11	Gretna	2-1	Barrow
12	Halstead Town	1-3	Dagenham & Redbridge
13	Hendon	0-1	Cambridge City
14	Hornchurch	1-4	Enfield
15	Knowsley United	3-0	Colwyn Bay
16	Lancaster City	1-2	Whitby Town
17	Leek Town	1-0	Emley
18	Metropolitan Police	5-2	Margate
19	Morecambe	2-0	Bridlington Town
20	Moreton Town	1-1	Mangotsfield United
21	Newport I O W	4-2	Newbury Town
22	North Ferriby United	1-1	Chorley
23	Northallerton Town	4-3	Netherfield
24	Nuneaton Borough	4-1	Worksop Town
25	Pershore Town	1-0	Atherstone United
26	Purfleet	1-2	Yeading
27	Raunds Town	0-4	Telford United
28	Rushden & Diamonds	4-0	Burton Albion
29	Solihull Borough	1-2	Bromsgrove Rovers
30	Tooting & Mitcham United	2-0	Dorking
31	Warrington Town	0-1	Stalybridge Celtic
32	Weston Super Mare	0-0	Tiverton Town
33	Weymouth	2-1	Barnstaple Town
34	Wimborne Town	0-1	Waterlooville
35	Winsford United	6-1	Buxton
36	Wivenhoe Town	2-0	Chelmsford City

=== Replays ===
Tie	Home team	Score	Away team
3	Gateshead	0-1	Billingham Synthonia
20	Mangotsfield United	1-2	Moreton Town
22	Chorley	2-1	North Ferriby United
32	Tiverton Town	0-2	Weston Super Mare

== 4th qualifying round ==
The teams that given byes to this round are Slough Town, Stafford Rangers, Bath City, Kidderminster Harriers, Altrincham, Kettering Town, Merthyr Tydfil, Witton Albion, Macclesfield Town, Southport, Farnborough Town, Sutton United, Aylesbury United, Hayes, Crawley Town, Marlow, Cheltenham Town, Accrington Stanley, Marine and V S Rugby.

=== Ties ===
Tie	Home team	Score	Away team
1	Altrincham	0-2	Accrington Stanley
2	Aylesbury United	1-2	Marlow
3	Bashley	1-1	Carshalton Athletic
4	Billingham Synthonia	1-1	Leek Town
5	Cambridge City	2-2	Dagenham & Redbridge
6	Cheltenham Town	1-1	Bath City
7	Chesham United	1-4	Kidderminster Harriers
8	Chorley	0-2	Marine
9	Crawley Town	2-1	Merthyr Tydfil
10	Hayes	0-2	Slough Town
11	Kettering Town	3-1	Canvey Island
12	Kingstonian	0-1	Metropolitan Police
13	Macclesfield Town	5-3	Southport
14	Molesey	0-0	Tooting & Mitcham United
15	Pershore Town	1-3	Yeading
16	Rushden & Diamonds	1-3	Bromsgrove Rovers
17	Stafford Rangers	1-1	Knowsley United
18	Stalybridge Celtic	1-1	Whitby Town
19	Stevenage Borough	1-2	Nuneaton Borough
20	Sutton United	0-0	Moreton Town
21	Telford United	2-0	Morecambe
22	V S Rugby	2-2	Harrow Borough
23	Waterlooville	1-3	Gravesend & Northfleet
24	Weston Super Mare	2-0	Newport I O W
25	Weymouth	1-4	Farnborough Town
26	Winsford United	0-0	Gretna
27	Witton Albion	2-1	Northallerton Town
28	Wivenhoe Town	1-2	Enfield

=== Replays ===
Tie	Home team	Score	Away team
3	Carshalton Athletic	4-2	Bashley
4	Leek Town	2-1	Billingham Synthonia
5	Dagenham & Redbridge	0-2	Cambridge City
6	Bath City	4-2	Cheltenham Town
14	Tooting & Mitcham United	1-2	Molesey
17	Knowsley United	2-2	Stafford Rangers
18	Whitby Town	0-1	Stalybridge Celtic
20	Moreton Town	0-2	Sutton United
22	Harrow Borough	1-2	V S Rugby
26	Gretna	5-0	Winsford United

=== 2nd replays ===
Tie	Home team	Score	Away team
17	Knowsley United	1-0	Stafford Rangers

== 1993-94 FA Cup ==
See 1993-94 FA Cup for details of the rounds from the first round Proper onwards.
