= Wealdstone F.C. =

Association football club in London, England

Coordinates: 51°34′10″N 0°25′0″W

Wealdstone
- Full name: Wealdstone Football Club
- Nicknames: The Stones; The Royals
- Founded: 1899; 127 years ago
- Ground: Grosvenor Vale
- Capacity: 4,085 (709 seated)
- Chairman: Rory Fitzgerald
- Manager: Gary Waddock
- League: National League
- 2025–26: National League, 15th of 24
- Website: wealdstone-fc.com
Home colours	Away colours

Wealdstone Football Club (/ˈwiːldstoʊn/ WEELD-stone) is an English semi-professional football club based in Ruislip, London Borough of Hillingdon, and affiliated to the Middlesex County Football Association. They currently play in the National League, the fifth level of the English football league system. Their traditional colours are royal blue and white, and they are nicknamed "The Stones" or "The Royals".

Whilst formally established in 1899, the club has roots dating back to 1887 and was created through a series of local team mergers. For most of its existence the club was based at the Lower Mead stadium in Harrow until 1991. After a long period of homelessness and ground sharing with various local clubs, since 2008 they have been based at Grosvenor Vale.

The club were the first to achieve the famed non-League 'double', winning both the FA Trophy and the Alliance Premier League (now the National League) in the same season (1984–85). The latter happened two years before automatic promotion to the Football League began; Wealdstone has never been a member of the Football League so far.

== History ==
=== Early years ===
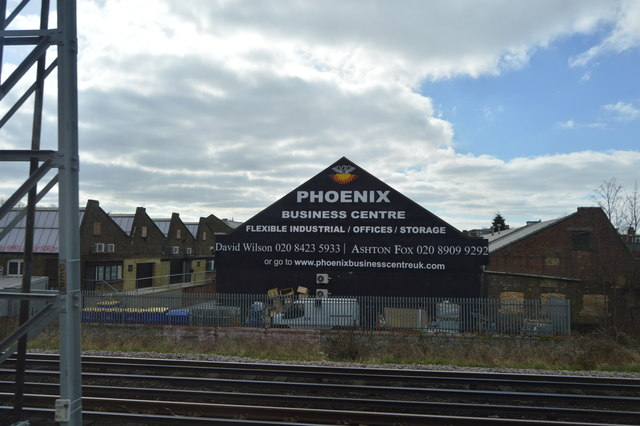
Approximate location of what was the original ground of The Oaks F.C. in 1887

The club was formed at the start of the 1899–1900 season, joining Division Two of the Willesden & District League. A previous "Wealdstone F.C." existed, for workers at a local gunsmith in Wealdstone, a Middlesex village to the north of Harrow Hill - itself has its origins in a club called The Oaks. An article published by the Harrow Observer states that the Wealdstone football club formed in about 1890, playing home games in a field in Hindes Road (present-day Harrow) and meeting at the Railway Hotel, close to Harrow and Wealdstone station. This club merged into another local club called Harrow Athletic F.C. in September 1894, while other clubs bearing the Wealdstone name soon formed. A merger between clubs called Wealdstone Rovers and Wealdstone Juniors resulted in the formation of Wealdstone Albion F.C. for the 1898 season, and using the same blue and white striped colours of the old Wealdstone F.C. A year later, Wealdstone F.C. took its place. At this time their home turf was a field between Headstone Drive and Marlborough Hill, Wealdstone.

Their first game was a friendly match on 7 October 1899 against Northwood, which they won 6–1. They were promoted to the league's Division One for the 1900–01 season after Division Two was scrapped. In 1903 they moved to the College Farm Ground in Locket Road, Wealdstone, and soon after another nearby ground in what is now Byron Park. In 1905–06 the club won Division One, but on 20 October 1906 a notice was posted in the local newspaper stating that the club was to be disbanded due to 'a lack of interest' from players and supporters.

The club was soon reformed in time for the 1908–09 season, rejoining Division One of the Willesden & District League. In 1910 they moved to Belmont Road, and won Division One again in 1912–13. Following World War I the club joined the London League and the Middlesex Senior League.

At the start of the 1922–23 season, Wealdstone F.C. switched to the Spartan League and at the same time moved south to a ground called Lower Mead in what is now central Harrow; this would become the permanent home ground of the club for 69 years. The club had their record win on 13 October 1923, beating the 12th London Regiment 22–0 in an FA Amateur Cup game.

=== Athenian League years (1928–1964) ===
In 1928–29 they switched leagues again, this time joining the Athenian League. In 1929–30 the club won the Middlesex Senior Cup and the Middlesex Senior Charity Cup for the first time. On Saturday 16 November 1929, Wealdstone played Dulwich Hamlet in the FA Cup fourth qualifying round, with the match ending in a record-breaking 7–7 draw; there has never been a 7–7 scoreline in any other FA Cup match before or since, and none either in the top four divisions of the League Pyramid (including play-offs), the League Cup, League Trophy, FA Community Shield, FA Trophy or FA Vase. Four days later, Dulwich won the replay 2–1.

During World War II the club continued to play, playing at Wembley Stadium in the final of the Middlesex Senior Red Cross Cup in 1942. In December 1944, they recorded their heaviest defeat ever, losing 14–0 to Edgware Town in the London Senior Cup. In 1946 the BBC showed part of Wealdstone's Athenian League match at Barnet, the first post-war match to be televised live.

Television cameras followed Wealdstone in the FA Cup qualifying rounds in 1949-50, with a 1-0 success at Edgware Town in the Third Qualifying Round and a home victory against Colchester in the Fourth shown live on the BBC. Wealdstone reached the first round of the FA Cup for the first time, losing 1–0 to Port Vale.

In 1951–52 the club won the Athenian League, and went on to win the Middlesex Senior Cup in 1959, 1963 and 1964.

=== Amateur Cup win and turning professional (1964–1979) ===
In 1964 they switched to the Isthmian League. In 1965–66 the club reached the first round of the FA Cup again, losing 3–1 at Millwall, but went on to win the FA Amateur Cup, beating local rivals Hendon 3–1 in the final at Wembley Stadium. The following season saw Wealdstone entering the FA Cup at the first round proper stage, losing 2–0 at home to Nuneaton Borough.

The club joined the Division One North of the Southern League in 1971, turning semi-professional. They were moved to Division One South the following season, and won the division in 1973–74, earning promotion to the Premier Division. In 1977–78 Wealdstone progressed beyond the first round of the FA Cup for the first time; after beating Third Division Hereford United 3–2 at Edgar Street in a first round replay, they went on to defeat Fourth Division Reading 2–1 at home in the second round, before losing 4–0 away at First Division Queens Park Rangers in the third round.

=== Conference and non-league double (1979–1988) ===
In 1979 the club were founder members of the Alliance Premier League, the new national top division of non-League football. After finishing 19th in 1980–81 they were relegated back to the Southern League, but then made an immediate return after winning the South Division of the Southern League the following season; a play-off ensued against Midland Division champions Nuneaton, with Wealdstone winning on penalties after winning the home leg 2–1 and losing 1–0 away. Wealdstone's return to the Alliance Premier League was much more positive than their first stint, finishing 3rd in 1982–83, and then 4th the following season.

In 1984–85 the club had its most successful season to date. Under the management of Brian Hall, Wealdstone won the Alliance Premier League and also the FA Trophy, beating Boston United 2–1 in the final at Wembley Stadium. This was first occasion that the non-league "double" had been achieved by any team. However, in spite of this, Wealdstone were not promoted to the English Football League; automatic promotion from the Alliance Premier League would not be introduced until two years later, and in any case Lower Mead was deemed not to meet Football League stadium requirements, so the club was not eligible to apply for election.

Following the double, a period of sharp decline soon set in; after finishing tenth the season after with an aging team, they finished 19th in 1986–87, and were eventually relegated at the end of the following season.

=== Decline, ground loss and nomadic existence (1988–2004) ===
By the end of the 1990–91 season, financial problems caused by boardroom impropriety were seriously exacerbated by the owner selling the club's Lower Mead ground for commercial redevelopment, for which the club, after a protracted legal wrangling, received only a very small share of the proceeds. The club then signed up to an expensive ground sharing arrangement at Watford's Vicarage Road stadium, and at the end of the 1991–92 season the club were relegated again, dropping from the Southern League Premier Division into the Southern League South Division.

Seeking to reduce expenditure, in 1993 the club began a two-season ground sharing agreement at The Warren, Yeading FC's ground. In June 1995, with the club's financial situation so perilous that it was formally in Administration, and only having two players registered to its name, Gordon Bartlett was appointed manager. Later that year, Wealdstone re-joined the Isthmian League to further reduce their travelling expenses, but in doing so had to agree to drop a level into Division Three in the process. Once again the club moved its home, this time entering into a ground share arrangement with Edgware Town at their White Lion ground, which continued for ten years.

Under Bartlett, stability and some success returned. After winning the Isthmian League Division Three in 1996–97, they finished second in Division Two in 1997–98 and were promoted again, this time to Division One. However, after finishing third in Division One in the 1998–99, the Isthmian League denied the club promotion to the Premier Division because required improvements at the White Lion ground were not completed until six days after a specified deadline.

=== Home search and recovery (2004–2019) ===
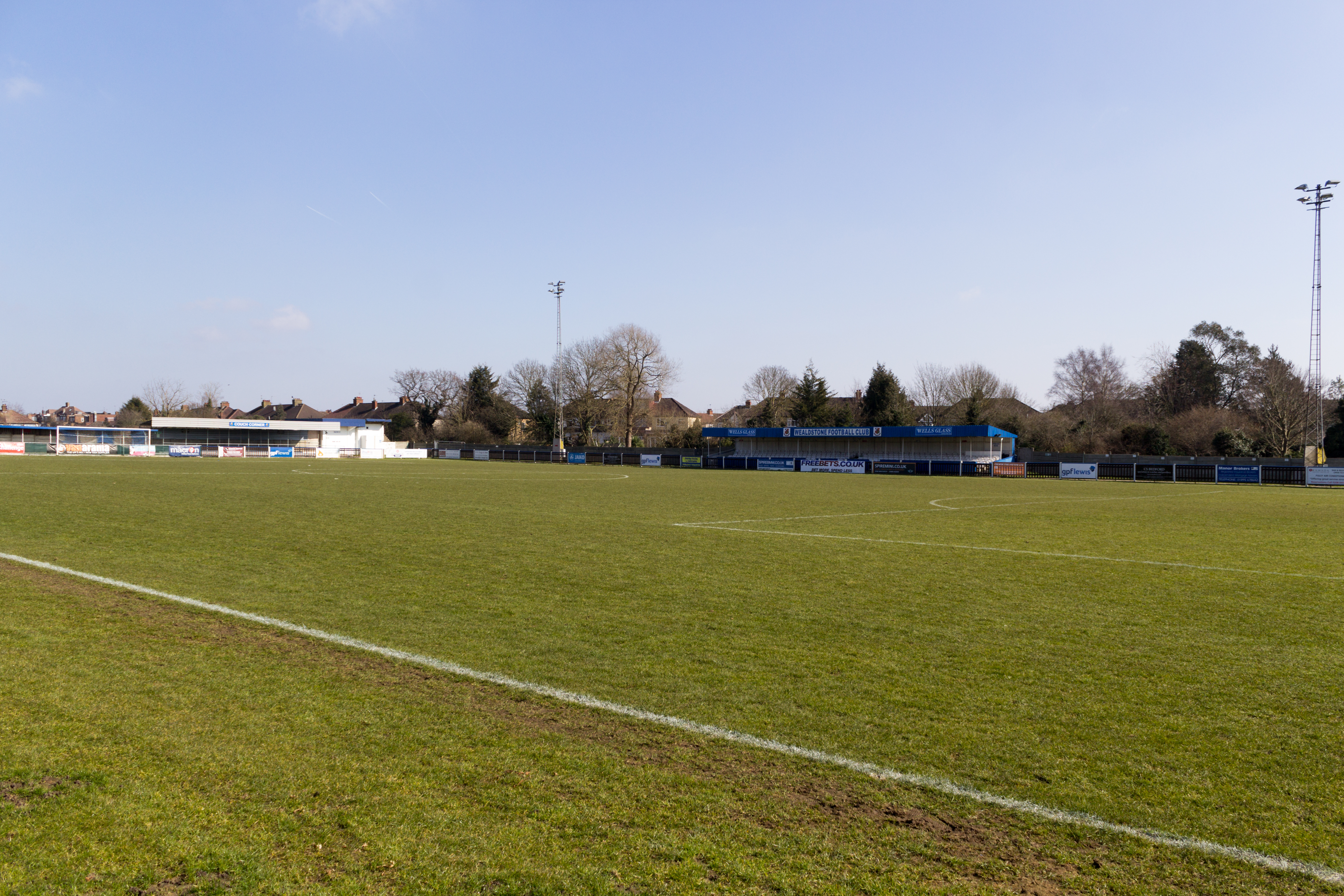
Grosvenor Vale in March 2016

The club attempted to redevelop the local disused Prince Edward Playing Fields at Canons Park, owned by the London Borough of Harrow, into a new home ground. Construction of the new stadium started in 2003 but, when over 30% completed, building work was suddenly halted in April 2004 when the private company who were co-financing the project in partnership with the club went into insolvency. Unable to afford to complete the new stadium on their own, Wealdstone had to leave the project unfinished for two years. Eventually, Harrow Council, frustrated that the site remained unused and was falling into dereliction, eventually sold the property lease to Barnet, who used the site as a training centre before later moving permanently in to what became The Hive Stadium in 2013. The terms of the council's lease offer indicated that the new owner should complete the stadium for Wealdstone's use, but this was ultimately ignored and the club's original financial investment in the project was lost.

In 2004 Wealdstone were promoted to the Isthmian League Premier Division as a result of the creation of the Conference North and South. The club faced Dulwich Hamlet in the play-off final, with the game finishing 2–2 before Wealdstone won 5–4 on penalties. The club's first two seasons at Premier Division level saw them steer clear of relegation, with back to back 18th-placed finishes. Off the pitch, the club began a further new groundshare arrangement in 2005, this time moving to Northwood's Chestnut Avenue ground. In 2006 they were switched under FA reorganisation to the Southern League Premier Division for a single season, before returning to the Isthmian League the following season.

In January 2008, Wealdstone acquired the Ruislip Sports and Social club and the associated lease at Ruislip Manor's Grosvenor Vale ground, starting the 2008–09 season there. With the ground share agreement at Northwood coming to an end and still no specific completion date in sight for the club's Prince Edward Playing Field project, Wealdstone instead decided to invest in the Grosvenor Vale stadium to upgrade the playing facilities as a priority, in order to meet the necessary ground grading requirements to play Isthmian League Premier Division football in the 2008–09 season. The club's first 3 seasons at Grosvenor Vale saw the club fail to reach the playoffs, finishing 7th, 6th and then 12th. They did however reach the first round of the FA Cup in 2009–10, where they lost 3–2 at home to Rotherham United

2011–12 saw Wealdstone embark on an FA Trophy run in which they reached the semi-final, knocking out three teams from higher divisions in the process. A 2–1 win at home to Conference side Barrow and a 1–0 win in a replay against Dartford of the Conference South set up a quarter-final away at Cambridge United which Wealdstone won 2–1 thanks to a Richard Jolly brace, before eventually losing 3–1 on aggregate to Newport County in the semi-final. They also reached the promotion play-offs in the Isthmian Premier Division that year, but lost 2–1 to Lowestoft Town in the semi-finals. The following season saw them losing in the play-off semi finals again, this time losing 2–1 against Concord Rangers. However, in 2013–14 did win promotion as league champions, with their promotion to the Conference South being secured with a 1–0 win away to Margate.

Wealdstone did not win any of their first 9 games in the Conference South, with the run ended by a 1–0 victory away to Whitehawk. An upturn in form meant that they finished the 2014–15 season in 12th place, and they would go on to finish 13th the following season. The summer of 2016 saw the club change ownership when Peter Marsden, previously chairman of Accrington Stanley, took over the club in late July. The 2016–17 season saw Wealdstone experience a greater degree of success on the pitch, with the club pushing for the playoffs. However, their hopes were dashed when it was announced that they would be ineligible to compete in the play-offs due to missing the cut off point to meet ground grading requirements. Wealdstone's eventual 8th-placed finish would not have seen them compete regardless.

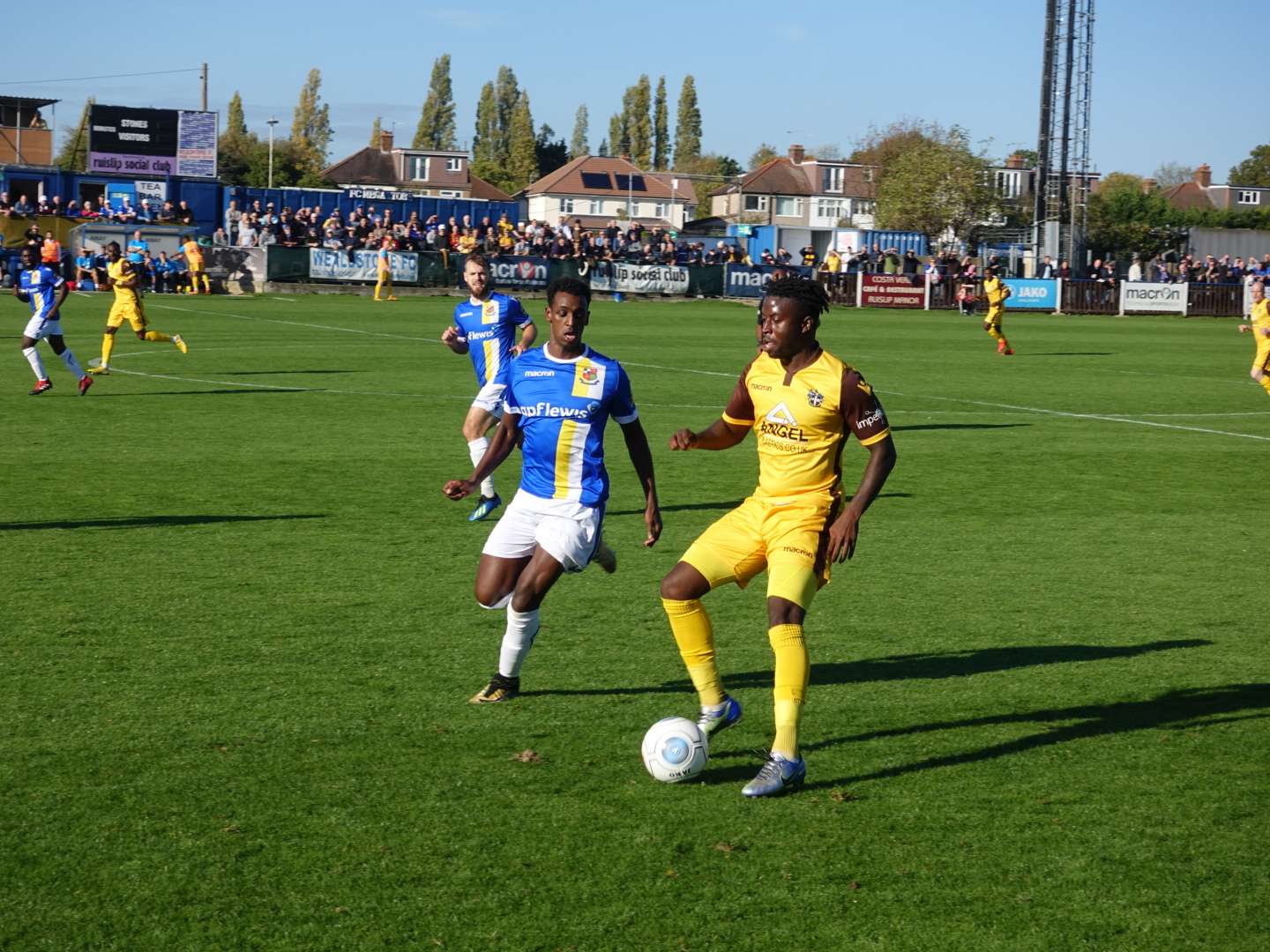
Wealdstone vs Sutton United in the FA Cup Fourth Qualifying Round in 2018

On 21 August 2017, Gordon Bartlett stepped down as Wealdstone manager after 22 years. A day later, Bobby Wilkinson, formerly of Hungerford Town, was appointed manager. Wilkinson's first season at Wealdstone ended in an unremarkable 11th-placed finish in the league, although the club reached the semi-final of the FA Trophy, where they lost 3–0 on aggregate to eventual winners Brackley Town. In January 2019, chairman Peter Marsden was voted out of his position, and replaced by Rory Fitzgerald. On the final day of the 2018–19 season, Wealdstone rose from 10th to 7th with a 2–1 win over Hemel Hempstead Town to ensure a place in the play-offs. Wealdstone began their play-off campaign with a win away at Bath City to secure a semi-final against Woking, which Wealdstone narrowly lost 3–2. Wilkinson subsequently left the club at the end of the season.

=== Title win and the National League (2019–present) ===
On 21 May 2019, Dean Brennan was appointed as new manager, with Stuart Maynard joining as his assistant. 10 wins in the first 11 games of the 2019–20 season saw Wealdstone rise to the top of the league. On 26 March 2020 the season was suspended due to the global COVID-19 pandemic, with Wealdstone still top of the league. On 17 June it was confirmed that the club were to be promoted to the National League as champions of the National League South, on the basis of points won per game.

Wealdstone's first season in the fifth tier for 32 years started positively, with the club winning 5 of its first 8 games. However, following a slump in form, Brennan departed his role as manager on 2 February 2021. The club subsequently appointed assistant manager Stuart Maynard as manager, with Matthew Saunders as his assistant. With matches being played behind closed doors and the level below having been voided, Wealdstone furloughed a number of first team players in the second half of the 2020–21 season, which contributed to the club suffering a number of heavy defeats. Despite this, they ended their first season back at National League level in 19th place, clear of what would have been the relegation zone.

In the 2021–22 season, Wealdstone recorded a 16th-placed finish, their highest league position for 35 years. The 2022–23 season began with Wealdstone winning 4 of their first 5 league games, seeing the club go top of the National League. They ultimately ended the season in 13th place.

On 16 November 2023, they announced plans for a new stadium after being allocated land by London Borough of Hillingdon.

On 18 January 2024, Maynard and Saunders left their roles at Wealdstone to join League Two side Notts County. Eight days later, then St. Albans City manager David Noble was named as Maynard's successor. His tenure saw only 2 league wins in 15 games, leaving the club in 20th and only above the relegation zone on goal difference. 73 days after his appointment, Noble was relieved of his duties after a 4–0 loss away to relegation rivals Boreham Wood. First team coach Sam Cox took charge for the remainder of the season. He guided the team to 3 wins from their last 5 games, finishing in 16th and 4 points clear of Boreham Wood in 21st.

In May 2024, former Walsall and Shrewsbury boss Matt Taylor was announced as manager. This was coupled with the news that the club would transition to a hybrid training model for the 2024–25 season. On 2 November 2024, Wealdstone made the FA Cup second round for the first time since 1983–84, after beating League Two side Grimsby Town 1–0. They were drawn against League One side Wycombe Wanderers but lost 2–0 in front of a then record crowd of 3,534 at Grosvenor Vale. In January 2025, with the club sat 21st in the league, Taylor left to join Solihull Moors. Neil Gibson was appointed as his replacement four days later. Wealdstone began the final day of the season in the relegation zone, however a 3–1 win over FC Halifax Town, combined with Dagenham & Redbridge only drawing with Solihull Moors, saw the club stay up by a point. Gibson subsequently departed by mutual consent.

In June 2025, Sam Cox was reappointed as manager on a permanent basis. Despite a positive start, he was relieved of his duties on 22 February 2026, following a run of one win in 13 league games. Gary Waddock was subsequently appointed as manager. On 28 March, the club faced Marine in the FA Trophy semi-final, in which a stoppage time goal from Micah Obiero clinched the club's first trip to Wembley Stadium since 1985 in front of a record Grosvenor Vale crowd of 4,000. The final saw Wealdstone lose 4–2 on penalties against Southend United, after the game ended 0–0 in normal time.

== Club crest ==
The club's crest first appeared on team shirts in the 1960s. It contains four quarters representing the traditional colours of the club (royal blue and white); the "Three Lions" representing England; a football representing the club's sport; and the emblem of Middlesex, the historic county of the London Borough of Harrow where the club is from.

== Rivalry ==
Wealdstone's main rivals are often considered to be Barnet. The clubs were both founding members of the Alliance Premier League and played each other regularly throughout the 1980s, although games were rarely played after that with the clubs being in different divisions. The rivalry came back to prominence when Barnet moved into The Hive Stadium which was originally intended for Wealdstone. With the two clubs playing in the same division (until the 25/26 season), the rivalry has become heightened after ex-Stones manager Dean Brennan joined Barnet, originally as Director of Football before becoming manager in late 2021. Other rivals have included Harrow Borough (with whom the "Harrow Derby" is contested), Enfield, and Hendon, with Wealdstone beating the latter in the 1966 Amateur Cup final.

== Players ==
=== Current squad ===
As of 19 November 2026

Note: Flags indicate national team as defined under FIFA eligibility rules; some limited exceptions apply. Players may hold more than one non-FIFA nationality.

No.	Pos.	Nation	Player
1	GK	ENG	Dante Baptiste
3	DF	ENG	Joe Newton
4	MF	ENG	Jack Wells-Morrison
5	DF	ENG	Dion Conroy
6	DF	ENG	Mason Barrett
7	FW	ENG	Luke Norris (on loan from Boreham Wood)
8	MF	ENG	Dylan Kadji
9	FW	ENG	Olufela Olomola
10	MF	ENG	Jayden Harris
11	MF	ENG	Daniel Chesters
12	DF	ENG	Aidan Francis-Clarke
13	GK	ENG	Endurance Johnson
15	MF	ENG	Aaron Henry

No.	Pos.	Nation	Player
16	MF	IRL	Carmicheal Uchenna
17	FW	ZIM	Admiral Muskwe
18	DF	ENG	Kyle Smith
20	MF	ENG	Milton Oni (on loan from Colchester United)
22	DF	SCO	Connor McAvoy (Team Captain)
23	DF	ENG	Jaydn Mundle-Smith
26	FW	ENG	Fejiri Okenabirhie
27	MF	ENG	Tyrelle Newton (on loan from Gateshead)
29	FW	ENG	Amaru Kaunda
30	DF	ENG	Joshua Clay
31	MF	IRL	Ronan Maher (on loan from Walsall)
32	DF	SLE	Abraham Kanu (on loan from Reading)

=== Out on loan ===
Note: Flags indicate national team as defined under FIFA eligibility rules; some limited exceptions apply. Players may hold more than one non-FIFA nationality.

No.	Pos.	Nation	Player
2	DF	ENG	Jack Cook (Club Captain, on loan at Hampton & Richmond Borough)
19	FW	IRL	Wilson Waweru (on loan at Hampton & Richmond Borough)
21	FW	BEL	Jeffrey Sekyere (on loan at Berkhamsted)

=== Notable former players ===
For all Wealdstone F.C. players with a Wikipedia article, see Category:Wealdstone F.C. players

The club's all-time leading goalscorer is George Duck. Duck scored 251 goals for Wealdstone in 370 appearances between 1972 and 1979, and additionally set unmatched scoring records for penalties and hat-tricks. In every season he played for the club Duck was top scorer in league and cup competitions.

Amongst former players who have gone on to notable careers at the highest level of professional football are Stuart Pearce, Vinnie Jones and Jermaine Beckford. Harold Smith was the first ever player to leave Wealdstone FC for a professional career, joining Notts County in 1930.

== Non-playing staff ==
As of 20 February 2026

Position	Staff
Manager	Gary Waddock
Assistant Manager	Danny Payne
First Team Coach	Kenny Mutsanya
First Team Coach	Elliot Minto
Goalkeeping Coach	Jason Scannell
Strength and Conditioning Coach	Luke Molloy
Sports Therapist	Georgie Turner
Kit Manager	Brett Aherne
Head of Academy	Dale Welch

Source: https://www.wealdstone-fc.com/management-team

== Management ==
As of 6 October 2025

Name	Role
(England) Rory Fitzgerald	Chairman
(England) Dominic Whyley	Vice-chairman
(England) Darren Linden	Executive Director Engagement and Media
(England) Nick Symmons	Executive Director Operations
(England) Danny Kindell	Executive Director Academy and Community
(England) Quentin Fox	Executive Director Legal
(England) Peter Worby	Associate Director
(England) Paul Fruin	Associate Director & Club Secretary
(Scotland) Joe Campbell	Head of Media
(England) Richard Hopwood	Chief Operating Officer
(England) Andrew Lane	Company Secretary

== Managerial history ==
- Pre 1961 Team selection committee
- June 1961 – April 1968: Vince Burgess
- May 1968 – December 1969: Dave Underwood
- December 1969 – June 1970: Howard Moxon
- June 1970 – March 1972: Alan Humphries
- March 1972 – March 1974: Syd Prosser
- March 1974 – March 1976: Eddie Presland
- April 1976 – February 1977: Geoff Coleman
- February 1977 – September 1979: Alan Fogarty
- September 1979 – November 1980: Ken Payne
- November 1980 – August 1983: Allen Batsford
- August 1983 – January 1987: Brian Hall
- February 1987 – September 1987: Colin Meldrum
- September 1987 – November 1987: Terry Burton
- December 1987 – October 1989: Tony Jennings
- October 1989 – December 1990: Alan Gane
- December 1990 – September 1992: Brian Hall
- September 1992 – September 1993: Dennis Byatt
- September 1993 – June 1995: Fred Callaghan
- July 1995 – August 2017: Gordon Bartlett
- August 2017 – May 2019: Bobby Wilkinson
- May 2019 – February 2021: Dean Brennan
- March 2021 – January 2024: Stuart Maynard
- January 2024: Alex Dyer (interim)
- January 2024 – April 2024: David Noble
- April 2024: Sam Cox (interim)
- May 2024 – January 2025: Matt Taylor
- January 2025: Paul Hughes (interim)
- January 2025 – May 2025: Neil Gibson
- June 2025 – February 2026: Sam Cox
- February 2026: Danny Payne (caretaker)
- February 2026 – Present: Gary Waddock

== Records ==
- Best FA Cup performance: Third round, 1977–78
- Best FA Trophy performance: Winners, 1984–85
- Best FA Vase performance: Third round, 1997–98
- Best FA Amateur Cup performance: Winners, 1965–66
- Record attendance (Lower Mead): 13,504 vs Leytonstone, FA Amateur Cup fourth round replay, 5 March 1949
- Record attendance (Grosvenor Vale): 4,000 vs Marine, FA Trophy semi-final, 28 March 2026
- Biggest victory: 22–0 vs 12th London Regiment, FA Amateur Cup, 13 October 1923
- Heaviest defeat: 14–0 vs Edgware Town, London Senior Cup, 9 December 1944
- Most appearances: Charlie Townsend, 514
- Most goals: George Duck, 251

== Honours ==
League

- Alliance Premier League (level 5)
  - Champions: 1984–85
- National League South (level 6)
  - Champions: 2019–20
- Isthmian League Premier Division (level 7)
  - Champions: 2013–14
- Isthmian League Division Three (level 9)
  - Champions: 1996–97
- Southern League Division One (level 6)
  - Champions: 1973–74, 1981–82
- Athenian League
  - Champions: 1951–52
- Willesden & District League Division One
  - Champions: 1905–06, 1912–13
- Suburban League North Division
  - Champions: 1990–91

Cup

- FA Trophy
  - Winners: 1984–85
  - Runners-up: 2025–26
- FA Amateur Cup
  - Winners: 1965–66
- Southern League Cup
  - Winners: 1981–82
- Southern League Championship Shield
  - Winners: 1981–82
- Southern League Championship Cup
  - Winners: 1981–82
- Middlesex Premier Cup
  - Winners: 2003–04, 2007–08, 2008–09, 2010–11
- London Senior Cup
  - Winners: 1961–62 (shared with Wimbledon)
- Middlesex Senior Cup
  - Winners (11): 1929–30, 1937–38, 1940–41, 1941–42, 1942–43, 1945–46, 1958–59, 1962–63, 1963–64, 1967–68, 1984–85
- Middlesex Charity Cup
  - Winners (9): 1929–30, 1930–31, 1937–38, 1938–39, 1949–50, 1963–64, 1967–68, 2003–04, 2010–11
- Middlesex Junior Cup
  - Winners: 1912–13
