= 1984–85 FA Trophy =

1984-85 FA Trophy
FA Challenge Trophy

Tournament details
- Country: England; Wales
- Teams: 206

Final positions
- Champions: Wealdstone
- Runners-up: Boston United

The 1984–85 FA Trophy was the sixteenth season of the FA Trophy.

== Preliminary round ==
=== Ties ===
Tie	Home team	Score	Away team
1	Banbury United	2-3	Cambridge City
2	Caernarfon Town	3-1	Prescot Cables
3	Chatham Town	5-1	Hounslow
4	Clandown	2-1	Maesteg Park
5	Colwyn Bay	2-1	St Helens Town
6	Congleton Town	2-1	Ashton United
7	Dunstable	2-3	Lewes
8	Glossop	3-0	Belper Town
9	Highgate United	1-1	Milton Keynes City
10	Llanelli	0-2	Bideford
11	Metropolitan Police	4-2	Dover Athletic
12	Netherfield	1-1	Bridlington Trinity
13	Radcliffe Borough	3-1	Accrington Stanley
14	Tonbridge	2-3	Hornchurch
15	Wellingborough Town	1-3	Redditch United

=== Replays ===
Tie	Home team	Score	Away team
9	Milton Keynes City	1-2	Highgate United
12	Bridlington Trinity	1-2	Netherfield

== First qualifying round ==
=== Ties ===
Tie	Home team	Score	Away team
1	Addlestone & Weybridge	2-1	Crawley Town
2	Alfreton Town	2-2	Gainsborough Trinity
3	Andover	0-0	Epsom & Ewell
4	Aveley	0-0	Hertford Town
5	Barnstaple Town	1-3	Minehead
6	Basingstoke Town	3-1	Leatherhead
7	Bedworth United	0-1	Leicester United
8	Bideford	3-1	Bridgend Town
9	Billingham Synthonia	0-2	Penrith
10	Bognor Regis Town	5-0	Ashford Town (Kent)
11	Boreham Wood	3-1	Maidenhead United
12	Bromley	1-0	Fareham Town
13	Burscough	0-1	Peterlee Newtown
14	Buxton	0-0	Horwich R M I
15	Caernarfon Town	2-4	Bootle
16	Cambridge City	2-1	Oxford City
17	Canterbury City	1-0	Waterlooville
18	Chatham Town	0-2	Tooting & Mitcham United
19	Cheltenham Town - Bye (due to Bridgwater Town folding)		
20	Colwyn Bay	0-1	Stafford Rangers
21	Consett	1-0	Durham City
22	Curzon Ashton	2-0	Glossop
23	Eastwood Town	3-3	Corby Town
24	Evenwood Town	1-4	South Bank
25	Farnborough Town	1-1	Sittingbourne
26	Ferryhill Athletic	2-2	Worksop Town
27	Folkestone	6-2	Thanet United
28	Forest Green Rovers	2-2	Poole Town
29	Harlow Town	2-1	Chesham United
30	Heanor Town	0-1	Shepshed Charterhouse
31	Hednesford Town	3-1	Highgate United
32	Hillingdon	2-2	Tilbury
33	Hitchin Town	1-4	Hampton
34	Hyde United	1-0	Oswestry Town
35	Ilkeston Town	2-2	Dudley Town
36	King's Lynn	4-2	Clapton
37	Kingstonian	1-2	Staines Town
38	Lancaster City	1-3	Goole Town
39	Leyland Motors	2-4	Tow Law Town
40	Macclesfield Town	3-0	Leek Town
41	Melksham Town	2-1	Clandown
42	Mexborough Town Athletic	1-4	Southport
43	Moor Green	0-1	Alvechurch
44	Netherfield	0-4	Gretna
45	Oldbury United	3-1	Arnold
46	St Albans City	2-1	Basildon United
47	Shepton Mallet Town	1-3	Frome Town
48	Shildon	3-5	Morecambe
49	Spalding United	1-2	Billericay Town
50	Stalybridge Celtic	3-1	Formby
51	Stourbridge	2-1	Sutton Town
52	Sutton Coldfield Town	1-2	Redditch United
53	Tamworth	1-0	Lye Town
54	Taunton Town	2-0	R S Southampton
55	Walthamstow Avenue	1-2	Witney Town
56	Walton & Hersham	1-5	Metropolitan Police
57	Wembley	0-1	Hornchurch
58	Weston super Mare	1-1	Salisbury
59	Whitley Bay	3-0	Ashington
60	Willenhall Town	1-1	Congleton Town
61	Winsford United	1-2	Radcliffe Borough
62	Woking	1-1	Lewes
63	Wokingham Town	2-0	Sheppey United
64	Workington	3-0	Crook Town

=== Replays ===
Tie	Home team	Score	Away team
2	Gainsborough Trinity	3-3	Alfreton Town
3	Epsom & Ewell	2-1	Andover
4	Hertford Town	0-2	Aveley
14	Horwich R M I	2-2	Buxton
23	Corby Town	2-0	Eastwood Town
25	Sittingbourne	2-2	Farnborough Town
26	Worksop Town	4-1	Ferryhill Athletic
28	Poole Town	0-4	Forest Green Rovers
32	Tilbury	1-2	Hillingdon
35	Dudley Town	5-1	Ilkeston Town
58	Salisbury	3-0	Weston super Mare
60	Congleton Town	2-1	Willenhall Town
62	Lewes	1-3	Woking

=== 2nd replays ===
Tie	Home team	Score	Away team
2	Alfreton Town	4-0	Gainsborough Trinity
14	Horwich R M I	2-4	Buxton
25	Farnborough Town	2-0	Sittingbourne

== Second qualifying round ==
=== Ties ===
Tie	Home team	Score	Away team
1	Alvechurch	3-2	Redditch United
2	Aveley	1-0	Bognor Regis Town
3	Bideford	1-3	Cheltenham Town
4	Bootle	2-0	Curzon Ashton
5	Boreham Wood	0-2	Folkestone
6	Bromley	1-1	Farnborough Town
7	Buxton	0-0	Alfreton Town
8	Cambridge City	2-5	Stourbridge
9	Consett	2-1	Tow Law Town
10	Epsom & Ewell	1-2	Woking
11	Frome Town	1-0	Minehead
12	Gretna	3-0	Whitley Bay
13	Hampton	2-1	Hornchurch
14	Harlow Town	5-1	Canterbury City
15	Hednesford Town	1-2	Tamworth
16	Hillingdon	1-1	St Albans City
17	Hyde United	1-2	King's Lynn
18	Leicester United	1-2	Dudley Town
19	Macclesfield Town	2-1	Congleton Town
20	Melksham Town	0-1	Forest Green Rovers
21	Metropolitan Police	1-3	Basingstoke Town
22	Morecambe	1-0	Goole Town
23	Oldbury United	3-1	Shepshed Charterhouse
24	Peterlee Newtown	0-2	South Bank
25	Radcliffe Borough	0-0	Workington
26	Salisbury	7-0	Taunton Town
27	Stafford Rangers	1-1	Corby Town
28	Staines Town	4-1	Witney Town
29	Stalybridge Celtic	3-1	Penrith
30	Tooting & Mitcham United	2-2	Billericay Town
31	Wokingham Town	5-0	Addlestone & Weybridge Town
32	Worksop Town	6-1	Southport

=== Replays ===
Tie	Home team	Score	Away team
6	Farnborough Town	0-1	Bromley
7	Alfreton Town	1-3	Buxton (tie awarded to Alfreton Town)
16	St Albans City	1-2	Hillingdon
25	Workington	0-1	Radcliffe Borough
27	Corby Town	0-1	Stafford Rangers
30	Billericay Town	4-1	Tooting & Mitcham United

== Third qualifying round ==
=== Ties ===
Tie	Home team	Score	Away team
1	Alvechurch	1-2	Boston United
2	Aveley	2-2	Woking
3	Barking	2-1	Gravesend & Northfleet
4	Basingstoke Town	0-2	Croydon
5	Billericay Town	1-2	Bishop's Stortford
6	Bishop Auckland	3-1	Mossley
7	Bromley	1-1	Stourbridge
8	Burton Albion	3-2	Alfreton Town
9	Chelmsford City	1-5	Wokingham Town
10	Dorchester Town	1-5	Cheltenham Town
11	Folkestone	1-2	Carshalton Athletic
12	Frome Town	7-1	Salisbury
13	Gloucester City	2-0	Yeovil Town
14	Gretna	2-0	Spennymoor United
15	Harlow Town	1-0	Hendon
16	Hayes	3-3	Sutton United
17	Horden Colliery Welfare	1-0	Radcliffe Borough
18	King's Lynn	1-0	Rhyl
19	Macclesfield Town	0-2	Kettering Town
20	Morecambe	2-0	South Bank
21	Oldbury United	0-2	Stafford Rangers
22	Slough Town	2-1	Aylesbury United
23	South Liverpool	1-1	Bootle
24	Staines Town	2-1	Hampton
25	Stalybridge Celtic	7-1	Consett
26	Tamworth	1-2	Grantham
27	Trowbridge Town	1-2	Merthyr Tydfil
28	Welling United	1-1	Hillingdon
29	Weymouth	6-1	Forest Green Rovers
30	Windsor & Eton	3-0	Hastings United
31	Witton Albion	1-1	Bromsgrove Rovers
32	Worksop Town	1-2	Dudley Town

=== Replays ===
Tie	Home team	Score	Away team
2	Woking	2-1	Aveley
7	Stourbridge	2-0	Bromley
16	Sutton United	2-1	Hayes
23	Bootle	0-0	South Liverpool
28	Hillingdon	1-3	Welling United
31	Bromsgrove Rovers	3-2	Witton Albion

=== 2nd replay ===
Tie	Home team	Score	Away team
23	Bootle	0-0	South Liverpool

=== 3rd replay ===
Tie	Home team	Score	Away team
23	South Liverpool	1-2	Bootle

== 1st round ==
The teams that given byes to this round are Northwich Victoria, Maidstone United, Nuneaton Borough, Altrincham, Wealdstone, Runcorn, Bath City, Worcester City, Barnet, Kidderminster Harriers, Telford United, Frickley Athletic, Scarborough, Enfield, Gateshead, Dagenham, Dartford, Barrow, Bangor City, Wycombe Wanderers, Blyth Spartans, Leytonstone Ilford, A P Leamington, Chorley, Harrow Borough, Whitby Town, Fisher Athletic, Matlock Town, Marine, Worthing, Dulwich Hamlet and North Shields.

=== Ties ===
Tie	Home team	Score	Away team
1	Barking	3-4	Staines Town
2	Bath City	0-0	Bishop's Stortofrd
3	Bishop Auckland	3-2	North Shields
4	Bootle	1-1	Bangor City
5	Boston United	5-4	Blyth Spartans
6	Bromsgrove Rovers	7-1	Whitby Town
7	Burton Albion	2-1	Kettering Town
8	Carshalton Athletic	1-2	Wokingham Town
9	Dagenham	3-3	Barnet
10	Dudley Town	4-0	A P Leamington
11	Dulwich Hamlet	0-0	Woking
12	Enfield	5-1	Stourbridge
13	Frickley Athletic	5-1	Barrow
14	Frome Town	2-0	Winsdor & Eton
15	Gateshead	2-1	Stalybridge Celtic
16	Gloucester City	0-2	Maidstone United
17	Grantham	0-0	Runcorn
18	Gretna	3-2	Kidderminster Harriers
19	Harlow Town	0-0	Wealdstone
20	Horden Colliery Welfare	0-0	Matlock Town
21	King's Lynn	1-2	Marine
22	Leytonstone Ilford	0-4	Fisher Athletic
23	Merthyr Tydfil	3-3	Croydon
24	Morecambe	0-2	Altrincham
25	Northwich Victoria	0-4	Telford United
26	Scarborough	1-0	Chorley
27	Slough Town	1-1	Harrow Borough
28	Stafford Rangers	2-0	Nuneaton Borough
29	Welling United	2-0	Sutton United
30	Weymouth	2-3	Cheltenham Town
31	Worthing	3-2	Worcester City
32	Wycombe Wanderers	6-1	Dartford

=== Replays ===
Tie	Home team	Score	Away team
2	Bishop's Stortford	2-2	Bath City
4	Bangor City	2-1	Bootle
9	Barnet	3-2	Dagenham
11	Woking	3-3	Dulwich Hamlet
17	Runcorn	3-2	Grantham
19	Wealdstone	5-0	Harlow Town
20	Matlock Town	3-0	Horden Colliery Welfare
23	Croydon	3-5	Merthyr Tydfil
27	Harrow Borough	2-0	Slough Town

=== 2nd replays ===
Tie	Home team	Score	Away team
2	Bishop's Stortford	1-2	Bath City
11	Woking	1-2	Dulwich Hamlet

== 2nd round ==
=== Ties ===
Tie	Home team	Score	Away team
1	Barnet	1-0	Gretna
2	Bath City	2-1	Cheltenham Town
3	Bishop Auckland	4-0	Dudley Town
4	Boston United	4-0	Frome Town
5	Bromsgrove Rovers	0-0	Matlock Town
6	Burton Albion	1-2	Altrincham
7	Dulwich Hamlet	0-1	Wokingham Town
8	Frickley Athletic	4-1	Gateshead
9	Harrow Borough	4-1	Staines Town
10	Maidstone United	0-0	Worthing
11	Marine	0-3	Enfield
12	Runcorn	1-0	Scarborough
13	Stafford Rangers	1-1	Bangor City
14	Telford United	1-2	Fisher Athletic
15	Wealdstone	2-1	Wycombe Wanderers
16	Welling United	0-0	Merthyr Tydfil

=== Replays ===
Tie	Home team	Score	Away team
5	Matlock Town	2-3	Bromsgrove Rovers
10	Worthing	0-2	Maidstone United
13	Bangor City	0-2	Stafford Rangers
16	Merthyr Tydfil	0-2	Welling United

== 3rd round ==
=== Ties ===
Tie	Home team	Score	Away team
1	Altrincham	2-1	Bishop Auckland
2	Boston United	1-0	Wokingham Town
3	Fisher Athletic	0-3	Frickley Athletic
4	Harrow Borough	1-6	Enfield
5	Maidstone United	1-1	Bath City
6	Runcorn	0-0	Barnet
7	Stafford Rangers	3-1	Bromsgrove Rovers
8	Wealdstone	3-1	Welling United

=== Replays ===
Tie	Home team	Score	Away team
5	Bath City	0-1	Maidstone United
6	Barnet	1-1	Runcorn

=== 2nd replay ===
Tie	Home team	Score	Away team
6	Barnet	0-0	Runcorn

=== 3rd replay ===
Tie	Home team	Score	Away team
6	Runcorn	4-0	Barnet

== 4th round ==
=== Ties ===
Tie	Home team	Score	Away team
1	Altrincham	4-1	Stafford Rangers
2	Boston United	3-0	Runcorn
3	Maidstone United	0-1	Enfield
4	Wealdstone	3-1	Frickley Athletic

== Semi finals ==
=== First leg ===
Tie	Home team	Score	Away team
1	Altrincham	0-0	Boston United
2	Enfield	0-2	Wealdstone

=== Second leg ===
Tie	Home team	Score	Away team	Aggregate
1	Boston United	3-2	Altrincham	3-2
2	Wealdstone	0-1	Enfield	2-1

== Final ==
=== Tie ===
Home team	Score	Away team
Wealdstone	2-1	Boston United
