= Association of Ukrainians in Great Britain =

Ukrainian association in the UK

- Союз українців у Великій Британії
- Abbreviation: AUGB; SUB
- Formation: January 19, 1946; 80 years ago
- Headquarters: 49 Linden Gardens, Notting Hill Gate, London
- Location: United Kingdom
- Origins: Ukrainians from the Polish Armed Forces under British command
- Members: approximately 2000 (2024)
- Key people: Fedir Kurlak (secretary)
- Publication: Ukrainian Review
- Website: augb.co.uk

The Association of Ukrainians in Great Britain (AUGB or SUB) (Ukrainian: Союз українців у Великій Британії (СУБ)) is an organization representing Ukrainians and individuals of Ukrainian heritage in the United Kingdom. The AUGB's headquarters is in London. The organization, which as of 2024 has almost 2000 members, is the largest organization representing the Ukrainian community in the UK.

== History ==
The Association of Ukrainians in Great Britain (AUGB) was founded on 19 January 1946. It became a charity under the terms of the Charity Act (1947) and the Unions Act (1948). Initially, its members were Ukrainians from the Polish Armed Forces under British command. The organization was conceived as an Association of Ukrainian Soldiers in the Polish Armed Forces. Membership grew significantly in 1947–1948 with the arrival of Ukrainian European Voluntary Workers and former soldiers of the Galicia Division, who were transitioning to civilian life. Between 1946 and 1949, approximately 23,600 individuals became members of the AUGB. One of the first AUGB branches was formed in 1948 in Bolton, Lancashire.

In 1954, the AUGB established the Ukrainian Review, which focused on the national question in Ukraine and the USSR.

== Organisation and membership ==
The AUGB, which as of 2024 had almost 2000 members, is the largest organization representing the Ukrainian community in the UK. It has several dozen active branches in England and Scotland. According to the AUGB, a branch is an organized group with at least 12 members.. It oversees a network of 28 local branches and 19 smaller branches and sub-branches. While the smaller branches and sub-branches do not have their own centres, they organize periodic events for Ukrainians in their respective areas. Overall, the organization owns 35 properties across the UK. These are used for Ukrainian clubs, schools of Ukrainian studies, and other Ukrainian-related activities.

The AUGB is run by an elected council under the leadership of its president, and a board of governors. In 1948, it had about 20,000 members. By 1955 there were 10,000 members, a reduction caused mainly by the emigration of Ukrainians from the UK. By the mid-1970s the membership had fallen to about 5,000.

The AUGB organises the UK branches of the Ukrainian Students Aid Commission, the Ukrainian Women's Organization in Great Britain, and the Union of Ukrainian Teachers and Educators. Groups within the organisation also includes the Ukrainian Ex-Servicemen's Association of Great Britain, the Ukrainian Youth Union in Great Britain, and the Ukrainian Information Service and Cooperative Union "New Fortune".

== Shevchenko Library and Archive ==
The Shevchenko Library and Archive (SL&A) in London is managed by the AUGB. It has become of one of the most extensive collections of books, periodicals, manuscripts, photographs, and other archival resources in Europe relating to the Ukrainian diaspora.

The SL&A houses over 35,000 volumes of academic publications, periodicals, and an archive collection of works by figures such as Hetman Danylo Skoropadsky and Stefan Terlezki. It also houses an art collection and a collection of Ukrainian postage stamps, sculptures, and photographs.

== Other activities ==
The AUGB is represented at conferences and events around the world. It supports Ukrainian students, youth and veteran organizations in Europe and Ukraine. The AUGB organises activities to help promote Ukrainian culture and traditions—such as performances, courses, conferences, concerts, and social events—and provides information about the life of Ukrainians across the globe. It publishes an annual "Calendar of the Ukrainian in Great Britain", and manages a retirement home in Surrey. There are schools of Ukrainian studies in 14 locations across the UK, which enroll a total of about 400 students. The Ukrainian Student Assistance Commission administers internships for young Ukrainians and has a studies centre in London.

The AUGB has published the weekly Ukrainian Thought since 1947, and the English-language quarterly magazine Ukrainian Review since 1954. Its children's magazine Young Friends was established in 1956. The AUGB has published over 30 books. Since 1949, the Homin Choir and the Orlyk Dance Ensemble have operated under its patronage; about 40 other amateur art groups are associated with the organisation. In 2022, the AUGB allocated 1.3 million euros to support the charitable organization Caritas Ukraine.

The AUGB is a member of the Ukrainian World Coordination Council, the Ukrainian World Congress, the World Confederation of Ukrainian State Organizations, the European Congress of Ukrainians, and the Ukrainian National Patriarchal Association.

== See also ==
- Ukraine – United Kingdom relations

== Sources ==
- Prymak, Thomas M. (2015). Gathering a Heritage: The Ukrainian Experience in Canada. University of Toronto Press. ISBN 978-1-4426-1438-3.
- Salveson, Paul (2023). Lancastrians. Mills, Mines and Minarets: A New History. Hurst Publishers. ISBN 978-1-80526-108-7.
