= Gerry Luczka =

English football manager

Personal information
- Place of birth: England

Team information
- Current team: Radcliffe Borough (Manager)

Managerial career
- Years: Team
- 2006–2008: Chorley
- 2008–2010: Radcliffe Borough DOF
- 2010–: Radcliffe Borough Manager

Gerry Luczka is an English football coach and manager.

== Career ==
Luczka gained experience as the first-team coach of Leigh RMI and as assistant manager at Stalybridge Celtic and Ashton United. He was appointed manager of Northern Premier League First Division club Chorley in October 2006, a position he would hold for 15 months, after his position became untenable after five defeats in six games culminated in a 7–0 reverse against Skelmersdale United.

In May 2008, Luczka became Director of Football at Radcliffe Borough of the Northern Premier League Division One North.

In September 2010, Gerry was appointed as Radcliffe Borough Manager following the departure of Kevin Glendon after 21 Years at the Club
