= List of Curzon Ashton F.C. seasons =

Curzon Ashton Football Club is an association football club based in Ashton-under-Lyne, Greater Manchester, England. Founded in 1963 and nicknamed "The Nash", the club is affiliated to the Manchester Football Association and currently competes in the National League North, (2023/24) at the sixth tier of English football. Curzon Ashton won Division One North of the Northern Premier League in the 2013–14 season, and the Premier Division play-offs in the 2014–15 season, thereby gaining promotion to the National League North. Home matches have been played at Tameside Stadium since 2005.

== Early history ==
Curzon Ashton was formed in 1963 after the merger of two clubs, Curzon Road Methodists F.C. and Assheton Amateurs F.C., who played in the Manchester Amateur Football League. The amalgamated club's name was originally Curzon Amateurs before being changed to the current name. Curzon joined the Manchester League. In 1970–71, they were Manchester Intermediate Cup runners-up, followed by a hat-trick of wins in the competition. In 1973–74, they were runners-up in Division One of the Manchester League and then runners-up in the Premier Division, a feat they matched the following season. The reserve team then won four championships in a row and in 1977–78 the league and cup double. By this time they were playing at National Park, former home of pre-war club Ashton National. From this they acquired their nickname of 'The Nash.' The 1978–79 season saw Curzon become founder members of the Cheshire League Division Two and they won promotion at the first attempt, missing the title by just two points. In their first season in the top flight, they became the first North West club to reach the semi-final of the FA Vase. They lost both legs 2–0 to Stamford, the home leg producing the club's record home attendance of 1,800.

== Key ==
Key to league record

- Level = Level of the league in the current league system
- Pld = Games played
- W = Games won
- D = Games drawn
- L = Games lost
- GF = Goals for
- GA = Goals against
- GD = Goals difference
- Pts = Points
- Position = Position in the final league table
- Top scorer and number of goals scored shown in bold when he was also top scorer for the division.

Key to cup records

- Res = Final reached round
- Rec = Final club record in the form of wins-draws-losses
- PR = Preliminary round
- QR1 (2, etc.) = Qualifying Cup rounds
- G = Group stage
- R1 (2, etc.) = Proper Cup rounds
- QF = Quarter-finalists
- SF = Semi-finalists
- F = Finalists
- A (QF, SF, F) = Area quarter-, semi-, finalists
- W = Winners

== Seasons ==
Year	League														Cup competitions						Manager
Year	Division	Lvl	Pld	W	D	L	GF	GA	GD	Pts	Position	Leading league scorer		Average attendance	FA Cup		FA Trophy		FA Vase		Manager
Year	Division	Lvl	Pld	W	D	L	GF	GA	GD	Pts	Position	Name	Goals	Average attendance	Res	Rec	Res	Rec	Res	Rec	Manager
Joined the new Cheshire County League Division Two from the Manchester Football League
1978–79	**Cheshire County League**; **Division Two**		34	18	9	7	57	32	+25	45	**2nd of 18**; Promoted				QR2	1-0-1	—		R1	0-0-1	
1979–80	**Cheshire County League**; **Division One**		38	11	14	13	48	55	-7	36	**9th of 20**				QR2	1-0-1	—		SF	6-1-2	
1980–81	**Cheshire County League**; **Division One**		38	14	8	16	48	63	-15	36	**12th of 20**				QR2	1-2-1	PR	0-0-1	—		
1981–82	**Cheshire County League**; **Division One**		38	12	15	11	57	50	+7	39	**8th of 20**				QR3	2-1-1	QR1	0-1-1	—		
League merged with the Lancashire Combination to create the North West Counties Football League
1982–83	**North West Counties**; **Football League**; **Division One**		38	14	8	16	46	47	-1	36	**12th of 20**				QR2	1-0-1	QR2	2-0-1	—		
1983–84	**North West Counties**; **Football League**; **Division One**		38	21	5	12	74	51	+23	47	**5th of 20**				QR1	0-0-1	QR1	1-1-1	—		
1984–85	**North West Counties**; **Football League**; **Division One**		38	21	6	11	85	60	+25	48	**6th of 20**				PR	0-0-1	QR2	1-0-1	—		
1985–86	**North West Counties**; **Football League**; **Division One**		38	18	9	11	52	50	+2	45	**8th of 20**				QR1	0-0-1	QR1	1-0-1	—		Peter Mayo; Les Sutton
1986–87	**North West Counties**; **Football League**; **Division One**		38	4	12	22	35	78	-43	20	**19th of 20**				PR	0-1-1	—		PR	0-0-1	
Joined the new Northern Premier League Division One
1987–88	**Northern Premier League**; **Division One**	7	36	8	4	24	43	73	-30	28	**18th of 19**				PR	0-0-1	—		EPR	0-1-1	David Noble; Steve Waywell
1988–89	**Northern Premier League**; **Division One**	7	42	13	11	18	74	72	+2	50	**13th of 22**				PR	0-0-1	—		R2	2-0-1	Steve Waywell
1989–90	**Northern Premier League**; **Division One**	7	42	17	11	14	66	60	+6	62	**8th of 22**				QR3	3-2-1	—		R3	3-1-1	Steve Waywell
1990–91	**Northern Premier League**; **Division One**	7	42	14	14	14	49	57	-8	56	**10th of 22**				QR2	1-0-1	—		R1	1-0-1	Steve Waywell
1991–92	**Northern Premier League**; **Division One**	7	42	15	9	18	71	83	-12	54	**11th of 22**				QR3	3-2-1	—		PR	0-0-1	Steve Waywell
1992–93	**Northern Premier League**; **Division One**	7	40	16	15	9	69	63	+6	63	**7th of 21**				QR1	0-0-1	—		R4	4-1-1	Steve Waywell; David Jones
1993–94	**Northern Premier League**; **Division One**	7	40	13	8	19	62	71	-9	47	**14th of 21**				QR1	0-1-1	QR1	0-1-1	—		
1994–95	**Northern Premier League**; **Division One**	7	42	10	16	16	64	80	-16	46	**15th of 22**				PR	0-0-1	QR3	2-0-1	—		
1995–96	**Northern Premier League**; **Division One**	7	40	20	7	13	73	53	+20	67	**4th of 21**				QR3	2-1-1	QR2	1-1-1	—		Derek Brownbill
1996–97	**Northern Premier League**; **Division One**	7	42	8	10	24	48	79	-31	34	**20th of 22**; Relegated				QR2	1-0-1	QR2	1-0-1	—		Terry McLean; Dave Denby; Ged Coyne
1997–98	**Northern Counties East**; **Football League**; **Premier Division**	8	38	7	8	23	42	75	-33	29	**19th of 20**; Relegated				PR	0-0-1	—		R2	0-0-1	
1998–99	**North West Counties**; **Football League**; **Division Two**	9	36	12	7	17	56	58	-2	43	**14th of 19**				QR1	0-0-1	—		R1	0-0-1	? Joe Murty
1999–2000	**North West Counties**; **Football League**; **Division Two**	9	34	24	6	4	78	26	+52	78	**2nd of 18**; Promoted				PR	0-0-1	—		R1	1-1-1	Joe Murty
2000–01	**North West Counties**; **Football League**; **Division One**	8	42	18	9	15	67	66	+1	63	**11th of 22**				PR	0-0-1	—		R1	1-0-1	Gary Lowe
2001–02	**North West Counties**; **Football League**; **Division One**	8	44	16	7	21	74	72	+2	55	**13th of 23**				PR	0-0-1	—		R2	2-0-1	Gary Lowe
2002–03	**North West Counties**; **Football League**; **Division One**	8	42	11	9	22	60	87	-27	42	**18th of 22**				EPR	0-0-1	—		QR2	0-0-1	Gary Lowe
2003–04	**North West Counties**; **Football League**; **Division One**	8	42	19	10	13	84	79	+5	64 (Note: Three points deducted)	**7th of 22**				PR	0-1-1	—		R1	1-0-1	Gary Lowe
2003–04	**North West Counties**; **Football League**; **Division One**	8	Level of the league decreased after the Conference North and South creation												PR	0-1-1	—		R1	1-0-1	Gary Lowe
2004–05	**North West Counties**; **Football League**; **Division One**	9	42	23	7	12	66	45	+21	76	**4th of 22**				EPR	0-0-1	—		R2	2-0-1	Gary Lowe
2005–06	**North West Counties**; **Football League**; **Division One**	9	42	20	8	14	72	66	+6	68	**7th of 22**				QR1	2-0-1	—		QR1	0-0-1	Gary Lowe
2006–07	**North West Counties**; **Football League**; **Division One**	9	42	31	6	5	116	38	+78	99	**2nd of 22**; Promoted				QR2	2-0-1	—		SF	9-1-1	Gary Lowe
2007–08	**Northern Premier League**; **Division One North**	8	42	23	9	10	78	48	+30	78	**4th of 18**			205	PR	0-0-1	QR2	2-0-1	—		Gary Lowe
2008–09	**Northern Premier League**; **Division One North**	8	40	20	8	12	66	44	+22	68	**5th of 21**			174	R2	5-2-1	PR	0-1-1	—		Gary Lowe
2009–10	**Northern Premier League**; **Division One North**	8	42	23	12	7	93	50	+43	75 (Note: Six points deducted)	**3rd of 22**			186	PR	0-1-1	PR	0-0-1	—		Gary Lowe
2010–11	**Northern Premier League**; **Division One North**	8	44	25	10	9	85	49	+36	85	**4th of 23**			172	QR1	1-2-1	R1	3-0-1	—		Gary Lowe
2011–12	**Northern Premier League**; **Division One North**	8	42	27	11	4	91	44	+47	92	**2nd of 22**			158	PR	0-1-1	QR3	2-1-1	—		John Flanagan
2012–13	**Northern Premier League**; **Division One North**	8	42	22	7	13	98	67	+31	73	**7th of 22**			174	QR2	1-2-1	QR1	0-2-1	—		John Flanagan
2013–14	**Northern Premier League**; **Division One North**	8	42	31	6	5	92	36	+56	99	**1st of 22**; Promoted			187	QR3	3-1-1	R1	4-0-1	—		John Flanagan
2014–15	**Northern Premier League**; **Premier Division**	7	46	23	14	9	79	46	+33	83	**4th of 24**			276	QR3	2-0-1	QR2	1-1-1	—		John Flanagan
2014–15	**Northern Premier League**; **Premier Division**	7	Promoted after winning the **play-off**												QR3	2-0-1	QR2	1-1-1	—		John Flanagan
2015–16	**National League North**	6	42	14	15	13	55	52	+3	57	**11th of 22**	Niall Cummins; Matty Warburton	12	407	QR2	0-0-1	R2	2-0-1	—		John Flanagan
2016–17	**National League North**	6	42	14	10	18	63	72	-9	52	**14th of 22**	Niall Cummins	14	405	R2	4-3-1	QR3	0-0-1	—		John Flanagan
2017–18	**National League North**	6	42	12	13	17	52	66	-14	49	**18th of 22**	Niall Cummins	15	531	QR2	0-0-1	QR3	0-0-1	—		John Flanagan
2018–19	**National League North**	6	42	13	10	19	44	71	-27	49	**18th of 22**	Ollie Crankshaw	9	450	QR3	1-0-1	QR3	0-0-1	—		John Flanagan
2019–20	**National League North**	6	33	8	10	15	34	42	-8	34	**20th of 22**	Sean Miller	7	382	QR2	0-1-1	R1	1-0-1	—		Mark Bradshaw
2019–20	**National League North**	6	The regular season was cut short due to COVID-19, final league positions decided by points-per-game												QR2	0-1-1	R1	1-0-1	—		Mark Bradshaw
2020–21	**National League North**	6	17	4	5	8	18	26	-8	17	**16th of 22**	Dominic Knowles	7	– (Note: COVID-19 prevented fans from attending games)	QR2	0-0-1	R2	0-0-1	—		Steve Cunningham
2020–21	**National League North**	6	The season was declared null and void due to COVID-19												QR2	0-0-1	R2	0-0-1	—		Steve Cunningham
2021–22	**National League North**	6	42	13	13	16	51	63	-12	52	**14th of 22**	Alex Curran	11	342	QR4	2–0–1	R3	1–0–1	—		Steve Cunningham; Adam Lakeland
2022–23	**National League North**	6	46	18	11	17	58	55	+3	65	**13th of 24**	Tom Peers	17	379	R1	3–3–0	R3	1–0–1	—		Adam Lakeland
2023–24	**National League North**	6	46	21	12	13	62	49	+13	75	**7th of 24**	Stefan Mols; Jimmy Spencer	11	406	R1	3–0–1	R3	1–0–1	—		Adam Lakeland; Craig Mahon
2023–24	**National League North**	6	Lost in the **play-off** quarterfinal												R1	3–0–1	R3	1–0–1	—		Adam Lakeland; Craig Mahon
2024–25	**National League North**	6	46	22	11	13	59	41	+18	77	**8th of 24**	Stefan Mols; Jimmy Spencer	12	484	R1	3–0–1	R2	0–1–0	—		Craig Mahon
2025-26	**National League North**	6	46	13	13	20	67	88	-21	52	**21st of 24** Relegated										

== Notes ==
- Curzon Ashton at the Football Club History Database
