= List of Warrington Town F.C. seasons =

Warrington Town Football Club is an association football club based in Warrington, Cheshire. They were established in 1949 under the name of Stockton Heath, adopting their current name in 1961. They currently compete in National League North and play at Cantilever Park.

== Early history ==
Formed in 1949 by Jimmy Drinkwater, the club was initially named Stockton Heath Albion and competed in the Warrington and District League until 1953, when they moved to the Mid Cheshire League. Freddie Worrall became manager at the same time, and during a 13-year spell in charge, the club won the league in 1959–60 plus the League Cup in three consecutive seasons during the 1950s. During his thirteen years at the helm, Heath were one of the most feared sides in Cheshire football, winning a string of honours including the Mid Cheshire League Championship in 1959–60, the League Cup in 1953–54, 1954–55, 1955–56 and made several appearances in the Cheshire Amateur Cup Final. At the club's 1961 AGM, it was decided to change the name to Warrington Town. In 1978 the club were founder members of Division Two of the Cheshire County League.

== Key ==
Key to league record

- Level = Level of the league in the current league system
- Pld = Games played
- W = Games won
- D = Games drawn
- L = Games lost
- GF = Goals for
- GA = Goals against
- GD = Goals difference
- Pts = Points
- Position = Position in the final league table
- Top scorer and number of goals scored shown in bold when he was also top scorer for the division.

Key to cup records

- Res = Final reached round
- Rec = Final club record in the form of wins-draws-losses
- PR = Preliminary round
- QR1 (2, etc.) = Qualifying Cup rounds
- G = Group stage
- R1 (2, etc.) = Proper Cup rounds
- QF = Quarter-finalists
- SF = Semi-finalists
- F = Finalists
- A(QF,SF,F) = Area quarter-, semi-, finalists
- W = Winners

== Seasons ==
Year	League														Cup competitions						Manager
Year	Division	Lvl	Pld	W	D	L	GF	GA	GD	Pts	Position	Leading league scorer		Average attendance	FA Cup		FA Trophy		FA Vase		Manager
Year	Division	Lvl	Pld	W	D	L	GF	GA	GD	Pts	Position	Name	Goals	Average attendance	Res	Rec	Res	Rec	Res	Rec	Manager
Joined the new Cheshire County League Division Two from the Mid-Cheshire Football League
1978–79	**Cheshire County League**; **Division Two**		34	11	5	18	45	69	-24	27	14th of 18				—		—		R1	0-0-1	
1979–80	**Cheshire County League**; **Division Two**		34	9	6	19	48	80	-32	24	15th of 18				—		—		R1	0-0-1	
1980–81	**Cheshire County League**; **Division Two**		38	15	5	18	59	78	-19	35	13th of 20				—		—		PR	0-0-1	
1981–82	**Cheshire County League**; **Division Two**		38	17	8	13	52	35	+17	42	8th of 20				—		—		R2	2-1-1	
League merged with the Lancashire Combination to create the North West Counties Football League
1982–83	**North West Counties**; **Football League**; **Division Three**	10	34	24	6	4	83	33	+50	54	2nd of 18				—		—		PR	0-0-1	
1983–84	**North West Counties**; **Football League**; **Division Two**	9	34	18	7	9	65	45	+20	43	4th of 18				PR	0-0-1	—		R4	4-0-1	
1984–85	**North West Counties**; **Football League**; **Division Two**	9	34	17	14	3	59	29	+30	48	3rd of 18				—		—		R3	3-0-1	
1985–86	**North West Counties**; **Football League**; **Division Two**	9	34	17	9	8	62	48	+14	43	4th of 18				QR1	1-0-1	—		SF	6-2-1	
1986–87	**North West Counties**; **Football League**; **Division Two**	9	34	16	13	5	48	34	+14	45	2nd of 18				QR1	0-0-1	—		F	7-0-1	
1987–88	**North West Counties**; **Football League**; **Division One**	8	34	16	5	13	68	47	+21	37	8th of 18				QR1	1-1-1	—		R2	0-0-1	
1988–89	**North West Counties**; **Football League**; **Division One**	8	34	16	10	8	47	37	+10	42	6th of 18				QR3	3-2-1	—		R2	0-0-1	
1989–90	**North West Counties**; **Football League**; **Division One**	8	34	22	6	6	69	31	+38	72	1st of 18				QR2	2-0-1	—		R4	3-1-1	
1990–91	**Northern Premier League**; **Division One**	7	42	17	10	15	68	52	+16	61	7th of 22				QR1	1-0-1	—		R2	1-2-1	
1991–92	**Northern Premier League**; **Division One**	7	42	20	8	14	79	64	+15	68	7th of 22				QR3	2-2-1	QR1	0-0-1	—		
1992–93	**Northern Premier League**; **Division One**	7	40	19	10	11	85	57	+28	67	5th of 21				QR1	2-0-1	QF	5-1-1	—		
1993–94	**Northern Premier League**; **Division One**	7	40	17	11	19	52	48	+4	62	7th of 21				QR3	3-1-1	R1	0-1-1	—		
1994–95	**Northern Premier League**; **Division One**	7	42	25	9	8	74	40	+34	84	3rd of 22				QR4	3-1-1	QR3	0-1-1	—		
1995–96	**Northern Premier League**; **Division One**	7	40	13	10	17	75	72	+3	49	13th of 21				QR1	0-1-1	QR1	0-0-1	—		
1996–97	**Northern Premier League**; **Division One**	7	42	5	18	19	42	79	-37	33	21st of 22				QR1	0-0-1	QR1	0-0-1	—		
1997–98	**North West Counties**; **Football League**; **Division One**	8	42	10	10	22	56	72	-16	40	19th of 22				QR1	1-0-1	—		R2	0-0-1	
1998–99	**North West Counties**; **Football League**; **Division Two**	9	36	18	9	9	82	46	+36	63	4th of 19				QR1	1-0-1	—		R4	3-0-1	
1999–2000	**North West Counties**; **Football League**; **Division Two**	9	34	14	8	12	66	44	+22	50	9th of 18				QR1	1-0-1	—		R3	2-1-1	
2000–01	**North West Counties**; **Football League**; **Division Two**	9	38	24	7	7	90	31	+59	79	1st of 20				QR1	1-0-1	—		R2	1-0-1	
2001–02	**North West Counties**; **Football League**; **Division One**	8	44	16	11	17	78	72	+6	59	11th of 23				PR	0-1-1	—		R1	2-0-1	
2002–03	**North West Counties**; **Football League**; **Division One**	8	42	11	11	20	48	66	-18	44	16th of 22				PR	0-1-1	—		R1	2-1-1	
2003–04	**North West Counties**; **Football League**; **Division One**	8	42	20	10	12	72	59	+13	70	5th of 22				QR3	4-1-1	—		R3	4-1-1	
2003–04	**North West Counties**; **Football League**; **Division One**	8	Despite promotion, the level remained the same after the Conference North and South creation												QR3	4-1-1	—		R3	4-1-1	
2004–05	**Northern Premier League**; **Division One**	8	42	11	13	18	45	59	-14	46	20th of 22			148	QR1	1-1-1	PR	0-0-1	—		
2005–06	**Northern Premier League**; **Division One**	8	42	11	15	16	62	74	-12	48	19th of 22			109	QR1	1-1-1	R1	2-3-1	—		
2006–07	**Northern Premier League**; **Division One**	8	42	13	8	25	64	84	-20	47	22nd of 24			114	QR3	3-1-1	QR1	1-0-1	—		
2007–08	**Northern Premier League**; **Division One South**	8	42	13	8	21	51	78	-27	47	13th of 18			121	PR	0-0-1	QR2	2-0-1	—		
2008–09	**Northern Premier League**; **Division One North**	8	40	11	8	21	50	73	-23	41	19th of 21			154	QR1	1-1-1	QR3	3-2-1	—		
2009–10	**Northern Premier League**; **Division One North**	8	42	18	6	18	65	69	-4	60	9th of 22			164	QR2	2-1-1	QR1	1-0-1	—		
2010–11	**Northern Premier League**; **Division One North**	8	44	18	16	10	70	52	+18	67 (Note: Three points deducted)	9th of 23			212	QR3	3-1-1	PR	0-0-1	—		
2011–12	**Northern Premier League**; **Division One North**	8	42	17	9	16	69	71	-2	60	11th of 22			164	QR2	2-0-1	PR	0-1-1	—		? Shaun Reid
2012–13	**Northern Premier League**; **Division One North**	8	42	19	12	11	76	54	+22	69	10th of 22			169	QR2	2-0-1	PR	0-0-1	—		Shaun Reid
2013–14	**Northern Premier League**; **Division One North**	8	42	27	6	9	86	47	+39	87	3rd of 22			212	QR2	2-2-1	PR	0-0-1	—		Shaun Reid
2013–14	**Northern Premier League**; **Division One North**	8	Lost in the **play-off** semifinal												QR2	2-2-1	PR	0-0-1	—		Shaun Reid
2014–15	**Northern Premier League**; **Division One North**	8	42	19	8	15	65	55	+10	65	9th of 22			225	R2	6-2-1	PR	0-0-1	—		Shaun Reid
2015–16	**Northern Premier League**; **Division One North**	8	42	34	4	4	121	36	+85	106	1st of 22			418	PR	0-0-1	QR3	3-0-1	—		Shaun Reid; Stuart Mellish & Lee Smith
2016–17	**Northern Premier League**; **Premier Division**	7	46	22	8	16	65	57	+8	74	10th of 24			286	QR1	0-0-1	QR1	0-0-1	—		Stuart Mellish & Lee Smith; Paul Carden
2017–18	**Northern Premier League**; **Premier Division**	7	46	23	13	10	72	49	+23	82	3rd of 24			275	QR2	1-1-1	R3	4-5-1	—		Paul Carden
2017–18	**Northern Premier League**; **Premier Division**	7	Lost in the **play-off** semifinal												QR2	1-1-1	R3	4-5-1	—		Paul Carden
2018–19	**Northern Premier League**; **Premier Division**	7	40	25	9	6	69	33	36	84	3rd of 21			405	QR4	3-2-1	QR1	0-0-1	—		Paul Carden
2018–19	**Northern Premier League**; **Premier Division**	7	Lost in the **play-off** superfinal												QR4	3-2-1	QR1	0-0-1	—		Paul Carden
2019–20	**Northern Premier League**; **Premier Division**	7	32	14	13	5	57	47	+13	55	3rd of 22			432	QR3	2-1-1	QR1	0-0-1	—		Paul Carden
2019–20	**Northern Premier League**; **Premier Division**	7	The regular season was cut short due to COVID-19, final league positions decided by points-per-game												QR3	2-1-1	QR1	0-0-1	—		Paul Carden
2020–21	**Northern Premier League**; **Premier Division**	7	9	5	1	3	16	11	+5	16	4th of 22			– (Note: COVID-19 prevented fans from attending games)	QR1	0-1-0	R1	0-1-1	—		Paul Carden; Mark Beesley
2020–21	**Northern Premier League**; **Premier Division**	7	The season was declared null and void due to COVID-19												QR1	0-1-0	R1	0-1-1	—		Paul Carden; Mark Beesley
2021–22	**Northern Premier League**; **Premier Division**	7	42	20	11	11	67	47	+20	71	5th of 22	Jordan Buckley	17	563	QR2	1–0–1	R2	2–1–0	—		Mark Beesley
2021–22	**Northern Premier League**; **Premier Division**	7	Lost in the **play-off** final												QR2	1–0–1	R2	2–1–0	—		Mark Beesley
2022–23	**Northern Premier League**; **Premier Division**	7	42	21	14	7	70	39	+31	77	2nd of 22			741	QR2	1–1–1	R2	2–0–1	—		Mark Beesley
2022–23	**Northern Premier League**; **Premier Division**	7	Promoted after winning the **play-off**												QR2	1–1–1	R2	2–0–1	—		Mark Beesley
2023–24	**National League North**	6	46	17	13	16	64	60	+4	64	13th of 24	Isaac Buckley-Ricketts	16	1,183	QR2	0–0–1	R2	0–0–1	—		Mark Beesley
2024–25	**National League North**	6	46	6	13	27	34	70	-36	31	23rd of 24	Joshua Amis	7	985	QR2	0–0–1	R2	0–0–1	—		Mark Beesley; Paul Carden

== Notes ==
- Warrington Town at the Football Club History Database
