= List of Fleetwood Town F.C. seasons =

Fleetwood Town Football Club is an English professional football club, based in the town of Fleetwood in Lancashire. The club participates in League Two, the fourth tier of English football.

== History ==
The current club was officially established in 1997 but, in two previous incarnations, the club's history dates back to 1908. The original club, Fleetwood F.C., were champions of the Lancashire Combination in 1923–24. After almost sixty years as a Lancashire Combination club, they were made founder members of the Northern Premier League in 1968. After winning the Northern Premier League Cup in 1971, the club languished in the lower half of the table, finishing bottom for two successive seasons and folded in 1976 because of financial difficulties.

The club was re-established in 1977 as Fleetwood Town F.C.. Initially placed in Division One of the Cheshire League, they were moved in 1982 to the North West Counties League Division Two in its inaugural year, and promoted to Division One in 1984. They reached the final of the FA Vase in 1985, losing 3–1 to Halesowen Town in front of a 16,000 crowd at Wembley. The club was placed in Division One (second tier) of the Northern Premier League when the league established a second tier in 1987, becoming the inaugural Division One Champions in 1988. However, by 1996, this second club had also folded.

Re-formed in 1997 as Fleetwood Wanderers, the club was placed back in Division One of the North West Counties Football League (now the tenth tier of the English League system) and a sponsorship deal saw the club's name immediately changed to Fleetwood Freeport F.C.. The club was promoted to the Premier Division of the North West Counties League in 1999 and renamed Fleetwood Town F.C. in 2002. Successive promotions as North West Counties League champions in 2005 and Northern Premier League First Division runners-up in 2006 saw the club reach the Northern Premier League Premier Division. The 2007–08 season Fleetwood won the Northern Premier League, gaining promotion to the Conference North.

Fleetwood contested the play-offs in the second season in the Conference North, and after beating Droylsden on penalties in the semi-final Fleetwood won promotion to the Football Conference by beating Alfreton Town 2–1 in the final. For the next season the club made all of its players full-time professionals. The club spent most of the season in or near the play-off positions, eventually qualifying by finishing in fifth place. In the play-off semi-finals, against AFC Wimbledon, a new attendance record of 4,112 was set in the home leg, but Fleetwood lost both games with an 8–1 aggregate scoreline. Fleetwood's 2011–12 season was very successful. In the FA Cup they reached the Third Round for the first time. After beating Mansfield Town, Wycombe Wanderers, and Yeovil Town, they were drawn at home to local rivals Blackpool, but lost 5–1 to the Championship club, with Jamie Vardy scoring Fleetwood's only goal. In the league Fleetwood went on a 29-game unbeaten run and were declared champions with two games remaining, giving them promotion to the Football League for the first time.

The 2013–14 season was another successful one. Having been in and around the automatic promotion places all season and getting to the League Trophy area final, the club narrowly missed out on automatic promotion finishing in 4th place. After beating York City in the play-off semi-final, Fleetwood beat Burton Albion 1–0 from an Antoni Sarcevic free-kick in the play-off final at Wembley on 26 May to win promotion to League One for the first time.

Playing at the club's highest level the 2014–15 season was the club's most successful yet. After three games the club was top of the league for two games and apart from a couple of games remained in the top half of the league all season eventually finishing a very credible 10th place.

== Key ==
Key to league record

- Level = Level of the league in the current league system
- Pld = Games played
- W = Games won
- D = Games drawn
- L = Games lost
- GF = Goals for
- GA = Goals against
- GD = Goals difference
- Pts = Points
- Position = Position in the final league table
- Top scorer and number of goals scored shown in bold when he was also top scorer for the division. Number of goals includes goals scored in play-offs.

Key to cup records

- Res = Final reached round
- Rec = Final club record in the form of wins-draws-losses
- PR = Preliminary round
- QR1 (2, etc.) = Qualifying Cup rounds
- G = Group stage
- R1 (2, etc.) = Proper Cup rounds
- QF = Quarter-finalists
- SF = Semi-finalists
- F = Finalists
- A (QF, SF, F) = Area quarter-, semi-, finalists
- W = Winners

== Seasons ==
Year	League	Lvl	Pld	W	D	L	GF	GA	GD	Pts	Position	Leading league scorer		FA Cup		FL Cup		FL Trophy FA Trophy		Average home attendance (Note: Average home attendance calculated using league games only)
Year	League	Lvl	Pld	W	D	L	GF	GA	GD	Pts	Position	Name	Goals	Res	Rec	Res	Rec	Res	Rec	Average home attendance
1908–09														PR	0-0-1					
1909–10																				
1910–11	**Lancashire Combination**; **Division Two**		38	14	6	18	72	83	-11	34	**14th of 20**			EPR	0-0-1					
1911–12	**Lancashire Combination**; **Division Two**		30	16	4	10	64	31	+33	36	**4th of 16**; Promoted									
1912–13	**Lancashire Combination**; **Division One**		34	14	7	13	71	69	+2	35	**9th of 18**									
1913–14	**Lancashire Combination**; **Division One**		34	10	9	15	54	57	-3	29	**11th of 18**									
1914–15	**Lancashire Combination**; **Division One**		32	9	5	18	65	94	-29	23	**14th of 17**									
No competitive football was played between 1915 and 1919 due to the World War I. Lancashire Combination switched to a single division.
1919–20	**Lancashire Combination**		34	15	3	16	67	63	+4	33	**12th of 18**			PR	0-0-1					
1920–21	**Lancashire Combination**		34	21	2	11	86	51	+35	44	**3rd of 18**			QR4	4-1-1					
1921–22	**Lancashire Combination**		34	19	5	10	76	43	+33	43	**5th of 18**			QR3	3-0-1					
1922–23	**Lancashire Combination**		34	16	7	11	66	51	+15	39	**6th of 18**			QR4	3-2-1					
1923–24	**Lancashire Combination**		38	29	5	4	100	40	+60	62	**1st of 20**			QR4	4-0-1					
1924–25	**Lancashire Combination**		36	14	11	11	74	59	+15	39	**7th of 19**			QR2	2-0-1					
1925–26	**Lancashire Combination**		38	19	7	12	87	69	+18	45	**4th of 20**			QR1	1-0-1					
1926–27	**Lancashire Combination**		38	14	5	19	63	82	-19	33	**12th of 20**			PR	0-0-1					
1927–28	**Lancashire Combination**		The club resigned from the league after 22 matches. Record was transferred to Prescot Cables.											QR1	1-0-1					
The club returned to the league after three seasons of absence.
1931–32	**Lancashire Combination**		36	17	7	12	98	78	+20	41	**7th of 19**									
1932–33	**Lancashire Combination**		38	21	7	10	97	58	+39	49	**5th of 20**									
1933–34	**Lancashire Combination**		38	27	4	7	109	60	+49	58	**2nd of 20**									
1934–35	**Lancashire Combination**		38	25	5	8	99	44	+55	55	**2nd of 20**									
1935–36	**Lancashire Combination**		40	23	6	11	117	64	+53	52	**3rd of 21**									
1936–37	**Lancashire Combination**		40	22	5	13	99	82	+17	49	**7th of 21**									
1937–38	**Lancashire Combination**		42	13	8	21	91	94	-3	34	**17th of 21**									
1938–39	**Lancashire Combination**		42	18	8	16	85	92	-7	44	**10th of 22**									
No competitive football was played between 1939 and 1945 due to the World War II. The club missed the first post-war Lancashire Combination season.
1946–47	**Lancashire Combination**		42	18	7	17	78	72	+6	43	**12th of 22**									
The Lancashire Combination expanded up to two divisions. The club remained in the top division.
1947–48	**Lancashire Combination**; **Division One**		42	23	7	12	73	52	+21	53	**5th of 22**			QR3	3-1-1					
1948–49	**Lancashire Combination**; **Division One**		42	17	8	17	81	66	+15	42	**11th of 22**			QR3	3-0-1					
1949–50	**Lancashire Combination**; **Division One**		42	18	9	15	76	67	+9	45	**8th of 22**			R1	5-0-1					
1950–51	**Lancashire Combination**; **Division One**		42	21	10	11	100	70	+30	52	**4th of 22**			QR1	1-1-1					
1951–52	**Lancashire Combination**; **Division One**		42	20	5	17	94	87	+7	45	**9th of 22**			QR4	3-0-1					
1952–53	**Lancashire Combination**; **Division One**		42	16	7	19	76	105	-29	39	**15th of 22**			QR1	0-1-1					
1953–54	**Lancashire Combination**; **Division One**		40	14	7	19	78	88	-10	35	**17th of 21**			QR2	1-0-1					
1954–55	**Lancashire Combination**; **Division One**		42	19	11	12	73	69	+4	49	**7th of 22**			QR2	1-1-1					
1955–56	**Lancashire Combination**; **Division One**		38	12	8	18	65	79	-14	32	**14th of 20**			QR3	1-2-1					
1956–57	**Lancashire Combination**; **Division One**		38	13	7	18	56	70	-14	33	**16th of 20**			QR3	2-1-1					
1957–58	**Lancashire Combination**; **Division One**		42	11	10	21	57	82	-25	32	**21st of 22**			QR1	0-0-1					
1958–59	**Lancashire Combination**; **Division One**		42	20	4	18	72	87	-15	44	**10th of 22**			QR2	1-0-1					
1959–60	**Lancashire Combination**; **Division One**		42	16	5	21	63	71	-8	37	**14th of 22**			QR1	0-1-1					
1960–61	**Lancashire Combination**; **Division One**		42	12	5	25	82	110	-28	29	**20th of 22**			QR2	1-0-1					
1961–62	**Lancashire Combination**; **Division One**		42	11	11	20	84	89	-5	33	**16th of 22**			QR2	1-1-1					
1962–63	**Lancashire Combination**; **Division One**		42	23	1	18	97	71	+26	47	**9th of 22**			QR2	1-0-1					
1963–64	**Lancashire Combination**; **Division One**		42	10	13	19	54	88	-34	33	**17th of 22**			QR2	0-0-1					
1964–65	**Lancashire Combination**; **Division One**		42	14	12	16	68	93	-25	40	**12th of 22**			QR2	1-0-1					
1965–66	**Lancashire Combination**; **Division One**		42	18	5	19	95	101	-6	41	**13th of 22**			R1	4-2-1					
1966–67	**Lancashire Combination**; **Division One**		42	22	10	10	103	62	+41	54	**5th of 22**			QR2	1-1-1					
1967–68	**Lancashire Combination**; **Division One**		42	22	10	10	72	43	+29	54	**4th of 22**			QR1	0-0-1					
Northern Premier League created. Club transferred to the newly created league.
1968–69	**Northern Premier League**	5	38	16	6	16	58	58	0	38	**10th of 20**			QR3	3-1-1					
1969–70	**Northern Premier League**	5	38	13	10	15	53	60	-7	36	**13th of 20**			QR4	3-0-1			QR3	0-0-1	
1970–71	**Northern Premier League**	5	42	10	11	21	56	90	-34	31	**18th of 22**			QR1	0-0-1			QR2	1-2-1	
1971–72	**Northern Premier League**	5	46	11	15	20	43	67	-24	37	**20th of 24**			QR2	1-1-1			QR3	2-1-1	
1972–73	**Northern Premier League**	5	46	5	15	26	31	77	-46	25	**24th of 24**			QR1	0-0-1			QR1	0-0-1	
1973–74	**Northern Premier League**	5	46	14	15	17	48	68	-20	43	**14th of 24**			QR2	1-2-1			PR	0-0-1	
1974–75	**Northern Premier League**	5	46	5	10	31	26	97	-71	20	**24th of 24**			QR1	0-0-1			PR	0-0-1	
1975–76	**Northern Premier League**	5	46	3	9	34	36	131	-95	15	**24th of 24**			QR2	1-1-1			QR2	1-2-1	
The club folded. Two years later new club named Fleetwood established.
1978–79	**Cheshire County League**; **Division One**		42	17	10	15	70	68	+2	44	**12th of 22**			QR3	2-3-1					
1979–80	**Cheshire County League**; **Division One**		38	10	11	17	51	63	-12	31	**17th of 20**			QR1	0-0-1			QR2	1-1-1	
1980–81	**Cheshire County League**; **Division One**		38	9	13	16	33	53	-20	31	**14th of 20**			R1	5-1-1			QR1	0-1-1	
1981–82	**Cheshire County League**; **Division One**		38	12	13	13	42	55	-13	37	**11th of 20**			QR1	0-1-1			QR1	0-0-1	
League merged with the Lancashire Combination to create the North West Counties Football League.
1982–83	**North West Counties League**; **Division Two**	8	38	12	8	18	54	80	-26	32	**12th of 20**			QR1	0-0-1			PR	0-0-1	
1983–84	**North West Counties League**; **Division Two**	8	34	24	8	2	73	24	+49	56	**1st of 18**; Promoted			QR1	1-0-1					
1984–85	**North West Counties League**; **Division One**	7	38	18	8	12	84	57	+27	44	**8th of 20**			QR1	0-0-1					
1985–86	**North West Counties League**; **Division One**	7	38	21	10	7	70	34	+36	50	**5th of 20**			QR1	1-1-1					
1986–87	**North West Counties League**; **Division One**	7	38	16	13	9	61	49	+12	45	**8th of 20**			QR2	2-0-1					
Northern Premier League Division One created. The club joined the new division.
1987–88	**Northern Premier League**; **Division One**	7	36	22	7	7	85	45	+40	73	**1st of 19**; Promoted			QR3	2-1-1					
1988–89	**Northern Premier League**; **Premier Division**	6	42	19	16	7	58	44	+14	73	**7th of 22**			QR4	3-3-1			R1	3-3-1	
1989–90	**Northern Premier League**; **Premier Division**	6	42	17	12	13	76	66	+7	63	**8th of 22**			QR1	0-2-1			QR1	0-0-1	
1990–91	**Northern Premier League**; **Premier Division**	6	40	20	9	11	69	44	+25	69	**4th of 21**			R1	4-0-1			R1	3-0-1	
1991–92	**Northern Premier League**; **Premier Division**	6	42	17	8	17	67	64	+3	59	**10th of 22**			QR2	1-0-1			R1	1-1-1	
1992–93	**Northern Premier League**; **Premier Division**	6	42	10	7	25	50	77	-27	37	**19th of 22**			QR2	1-0-1			QR3	0-0-1	
Club changed name to Fleetwood.
1993–94	**Northern Premier League**; **Premier Division**	6	42	7	7	28	55	114	-59	28	**22nd of 22**; Relegated			QR1	0-0-1			QR1	0-0-1	
1994–95	**Northern Premier League**; **Division One**	7	42	12	11	19	51	74	-23	44	**18th of 22**			PR	0-0-1			QR3	2-1-1	
1995–96	**Northern Premier League**; **Division One**	7	40	7	10	23	41	81	-40	31	**20th of 21**			PR	0-0-1			QR2	1-0-1	
The club folded and reestablished one year later under the name Fleetwood Freeport.
1997–98	**North West Counties League**; **Division Two**	9	40	15	11	14	73	55	+18	56	**12th of 21**									
1998–99	**North West Counties League**; **Division Two**	9	36	21	8	7	102	34	+68	71	**1st of 19**; Promoted									
1999–2000	**North West Counties League**; **Division One**	8	42	21	10	11	75	45	+30	73	**7th of 22**			QR2	2-0-0					
2000–01	**North West Counties League**; **Division One**	8	42	26	4	12	90	50	+40	82	**5th of 22**			QR2	2-2-1					
2001–02	**North West Counties League**; **Division One**	8	44	13	13	18	70	86	-16	52	**14th of 23**			QR1	1-0-1					
Club changed name to Fleetwood Town.
2002–03	**North West Counties League**; **Division One**	8	42	17	9	16	73	70	+3	60	**10th of 22**			PR	0-1-1					
2003–04	**North West Counties League**; **Division One**	8	42	26	8	8	84	51	+33	86	**3rd of 22**			QR2	3-1-1					
2003–04	**North West Counties League**; **Division One**	8	Level of the league decreased after the Conference North and South creation.											QR2	3-1-1					
2004–05	**North West Counties League**; **Division One**	9	42	31	6	5	107	42	+65	99	**1st of 22**; Promoted			QR2	3-1-1					
2005–06	**Northern Premier League**; **Division One**	8	42	22	10	10	72	48	+24	76	**2nd of 22**; Promoted			PR	0-0-1			QR3	2-0-1	466
2006–07	**Northern Premier League**; **Premier Division**	7	42	19	10	13	71	60	+11	67	**8th of 22**			R1	4-0-1			QR1	0-0-1	537
2007–08	**Northern Premier League**; **Premier Division**	7	40	28	7	5	81	39	+42	91	**1st of 21**; Promoted			QR3	2-0-1			QR2	1-1-1	721
2008–09	**Conference North**	6	42	17	11	14	70	66	+4	62	**8th of 22**			R2	4-1-1			QR3	0-0-1	920
2009–10	**Conference North**	6	40	26	7	7	86	44	+42	85	**2nd of 21**			R1	3-1-1			R2	2-0-1	1,319
2009–10	**Conference North**	6	Promoted after winning the play-offs.											R1	3-1-1			R2	2-0-1	1,319
2010–11	**Conference**; **Premier**	5	46	22	12	12	68	42	+26	78	**5th of 24**	Magno Vieira	22	R1	1-1-1			R1	0-0-1	1,748
2010–11	**Conference**; **Premier**	5	Lost in the play-off semifinal.											R1	1-1-1			R1	0-0-1	1,748
2011–12	**Conference**; **Premier**	5	46	31	10	5	102	48	+54	103	**1st of 24**; Promoted	**Jamie Vardy**	**31**	R3	3-2-1			R1	0-0-1	2,265
**2012–13**	**Football**; **League Two**	4	46	15	15	16	55	57	-2	60	**13th of 24**	Junior Brown; Jon Parkin	10	R2	1-0-1	R1	0-0-1	R1	0-1-0	2,856
**2013–14**	**Football**; **League Two**	4	46	22	10	14	66	52	+14	76	**4th of 24**	Antoni Sarcevic	13	R2	1-1-1	R1	0-0-1	AF	5-0-1	2,819
**2013–14**	**Football**; **League Two**	4	Promoted after winning the play-offs.											R2	1-1-1	R1	0-0-1	AF	5-0-1	2,819
**2014–15**	**Football**; **League One**	3	46	17	12	17	49	52	-3	63	**10th of 24**	David Ball; Josh Morris; Jamie Proctor	8	R1	0-0-1	R1	0-0-1	R1	0-0-1	3,522
**2015–16**	**Football**; **League One**	3	46	12	15	19	52	56	-4	51	**19th of 24**	Bobby Grant	10	R1	0-0-1	R1	0-0-1	AF	2-3-0	3,308
**2016–17**	**Football**; **League One**	3	46	23	13	10	64	43	+21	82	**4th of 24**	David Ball	14	R3	3-3-1	R1	0-1-0	GS	1-0-2	3,272
**2016–17**	**Football**; **League One**	3	Lost in the play-off semifinal.											R3	3-3-1	R1	0-1-0	GS	1-0-2	3,272
**2017–18**	**Football**; **League One**	3	46	16	9	21	59	68	-9	57	**14th of 24**	Devante Cole	10	R3	2-2-1	R1	0-0-1	R4	5-0-1	3,140
**2018–19**	**Football**; **League One**	3	46	16	13	17	58	52	+6	61	**11th of 24**	Ched Evans	17	R3	2-0-1	R2	0-1-1	GS	0-1-2	3,165
**2019–20**	**Football**; **League One**	3	35	16	12	7	51	38	+13	60	**6th of 24**	Paddy Madden	15	R3	2-0-1	R1	0-0-1	R3	2-2-1	3,130
**2019–20**	**Football**; **League One**	3	Lost in the play-off semifinal.											R3	2-0-1	R1	0-0-1	R3	2-2-1	3,130
**2020–21**	**Football**; **League One**	3	46	16	12	18	49	46	+3	60	**15th of 24**	Callum Camps	8	R1	0-0-1	R3	2-0-1	R3	3-1-1	– (Note: COVID-19 prevented fans from attending games)
**2021–22**	**Football**; **League One**	3	46	8	16	22	62	82	-20	40	**20th of 24**	Gerard Garner	7	R1	0-0-1	R1	0-0-1	R2	2-0-2	3,228
**2022–23**	**Football**; **League One**	3	46	14	16	16	53	51	2	58	**13th of 24**	Jack Marriott	8	R5	4-1-1	R2	1-0-1	GS	0-1-2	3,497
**2023–24**	**Football**; **League One**	3	46	10	13	23	49	72	-23	43	**22nd of 24**; Relegated	Jayden Stockley	9	R2	1-0-1	R1	0-0-1	R2	2-1-1	3,430
**2024–25**	**EFL**; **League Two**	4	46	15	15	16	60	60	0	60	**14th of 24**	Matty Virtue; Ronan Coughlan	8	R1	0-0-1	R3	2-1-0	GS	1-0-2	3,131
