= 1986–87 North West Counties Football League =

North West Counties Football League
- Season: 1986–87

The 1986–87 North West Counties Football League (known as the Bass North West Counties League for sponsorship reasons for the first of seven seasons) was the fifth in the history of the North West Counties Football League, a football competition in England.

The league comprised three divisions and there was additionally the League Challenge Cup knockout competition open to all the league's clubs and also a reserves team section. At the end of the season owing to the expansion of the Northern Premier League to two divisions 14 clubs left the league and subsequently the third division was discontinued.

== Division One ==
North West Counties Football League Division One
- Season: 1986–87
- Teams: 20
- Champions: Stalybridge Celtic
- Promoted: 12 clubs to Northern Premier League Division One
- Matches: 380
- Goals: 1,070 (2.82 per match)

Division One featured 20 clubs, 18 remaining from the previous season plus 2 additional both promoted from Division Two:

- Kirkby Town, promoted as champions
- Rossendale United, promoted as runners-up

At the end of the season 12 clubs with suitable ground grading left Division One to join the newly formed Northern Premier League Division One.

=== League table ===
Pos	Team	Pld	W	D	L	GF	GA	GD	Pts	Season End Notes
1	Stalybridge Celtic (C, P)	38	25	8	5	74	39	+35	58	Promoted to Northern Premier League Division One
2	Accrington Stanley (P)	38	19	15	4	63	32	+31	53	Promoted to Northern Premier League Division One
3	Clitheroe	38	20	12	6	76	47	+29	52	
4	Kirkby Town	38	22	4	12	71	48	+23	48	
5	Bootle	38	19	10	9	52	38	+14	48	
6	St Helens Town	38	19	9	10	65	37	+28	47	
7	Winsford United (P)	38	19	8	11	55	39	+16	46	Promoted to Northern Premier League Division One
8	Fleetwood Town (P)	38	16	13	9	61	49	+12	45	Promoted to Northern Premier League Division One
9	Penrith (P)	38	16	10	12	62	59	+3	42	Promoted to Northern Premier League Division One
10	Rossendale United	38	14	11	13	66	59	+7	39	
11	Congleton Town (P)	38	13	11	14	38	39	−1	37	Promoted to Northern Premier League Division One
12	Burscough	38	11	11	16	58	54	+4	33	
13	Leyland Motors	38	13	7	18	52	56	−4	33	
14	Eastwood Hanley (P)	38	10	11	17	40	50	−10	31	Promoted to Northern Premier League Division One
15	Radcliffe Borough (P)	38	11	8	19	46	57	−11	30	Promoted to Northern Premier League Division One
16	Leek Town (P)	38	9	12	17	42	55	−13	30	Promoted to Northern Premier League Division One
17	Netherfield (P)	38	12	5	21	45	73	−28	29	Promoted to Northern Premier League Division One
18	Irlam Town (P)	38	4	13	21	36	74	−38	21	Promoted to Northern Premier League Division One
19	Curzon Ashton (P)	38	4	12	22	35	78	−43	20	Promoted to Northern Premier League Division One
20	Glossop	38	5	8	25	33	87	−54	18	

Source: NWCFL: Final Tables, Season 1986/87
Rules for classification: The points system until the 1990–91 season: 2 points for a win, 1 point for a draw and 0 points for losing.
(C) Champions; (P) Promoted

== Division Two ==
North West Counties Football League Division Two
- Season: 1986–87
- Teams: 20
- Champions: Droylsden
- Promoted: 2 clubs to Northern Premier League Division One; 10 clubs to Division One
- Matches: 306
- Goals: 934 (3.05 per match)

Division Two featured 20 clubs, 16 remaining from the previous season plus 4 additional:

- Prescot Cables, relegated from Division One
- Formby, relegated from Division One
- Blackpool Mechanics, promoted as champions from Division Three
- Oldham Town, promoted as runners-up from Division Three

At the end of the season 2 clubs, the champions Droylsden and Lancaster City, left the league to join the newly formed Northern Premier League Division One. Warrington Town who occupied the runners-up promotion position and a further 9 clubs, selected not solely on the basis of their position in the final table but also having the necessary ground grading, were advanced to Division One to replace the clubs that had left that division to join the Northern Premier League. Bottom club Salford recorded only one win and scored 17 goals over the season, creating lows for both measures by any club to date in the top two divisions of the league.

=== League table ===
Pos	Team	Pld	W	D	L	GF	GA	GD	Pts	Season End Notes
1	Droylsden (C, P)	34	20	8	6	79	42	+37	48	Promoted to Northern Premier League Division One
2	Warrington Town (P)	34	16	13	5	48	34	+14	45	Promoted to Division One
3	Ashton United	34	19	6	9	73	45	+28	44	
4	Wren Rovers	34	18	8	8	65	39	+26	44	
5	Colwyn Bay (P)	34	17	9	8	61	43	+18	43	Promoted to Division One
6	Darwen (P)	34	15	8	11	45	47	−2	38	Promoted to Division One
7	Chadderton	34	14	9	11	52	47	+5	37	
8	Colne Dynamoes (P)	34	14	8	12	57	44	+13	36	Promoted to Division One
9	Skelmersdale United (P)	34	13	10	11	52	53	−1	36	Promoted to Division One
10	Ellesmere Port & Neston (P)	34	15	5	14	68	54	+14	35	Promoted to Division One
11	Formby (P)	34	13	7	14	54	55	−1	33	Promoted to Division One
12	Blackpool Mechanics	34	12	8	14	56	64	−8	32	
13	Lancaster City (P)	34	12	7	15	55	53	+2	31	Promoted to Northern Premier League Division One
14	Prescot Cables (P)	34	12	6	16	46	48	−2	28 (Note: Prescot Cables and Great Harwood Town had 2 points deducted)	Promoted to Division One
15	Great Harwood Town	34	9	8	17	36	59	−23	24	
16	Oldham Town	34	7	9	18	38	57	−19	23	
17	Atherton Laburnum Rovers (P)	34	8	5	21	32	61	−29	21	Promoted to Division One
18	Salford (P)	34	1	8	25	17	89	−72	10	Promoted to Division One

Source: NWCFL: Final Tables, Season 1986/87
Rules for classification: The points system until the 1990–91 season: 2 points for a win, 1 point for a draw and 0 points for losing.
(C) Champions; (P) Promoted

== Division Three ==
North West Counties Football League Division Three
- Season: 1986–87
- Teams: 13
- Champions: Atherton Collieries
- Promoted: 13 clubs to Division Two
- Matches: 156
- Goals: 453 (2.9 per match)

Division Three featured 13 clubs, 9 remaining from the previous season plus 4 additional:

- Ford Motors, relegated from Division Two
- Nantwich Town, relegated from Division Two
- Flixton, joined from the Manchester League
- Ashton Town, joined from the Manchester League

At the end of the season to rebuild Division Two following the movement of its clubs to Division One (to replace the clubs that had left the league to join the expanded Northern Premier League) all this division's clubs were advanced to Division Two and subsequently Division Three was discontinued.

=== League table ===
Pos	Team	Pld	W	D	L	GF	GA	GD	Pts	Season End Notes
1	Atherton Collieries (C, P)	24	16	4	4	46	22	+24	36	Promoted to Division Two
2	Flixton (P)	24	15	5	4	58	29	+29	35	Promoted to Division Two
3	Maghull (P)	24	14	2	8	44	29	+15	30	Promoted to Division Two
4	Nelson (P)	24	12	6	6	37	29	+8	30	Promoted to Division Two
5	Newton (P)	24	11	5	8	42	36	+6	27	Promoted to Division Two
6	Ford Motors (P)	24	9	8	7	38	27	+11	26	Promoted to Division Two
7	Bacup Borough (P)	24	10	6	8	27	27	0	26	Promoted to Division Two
8	Cheadle Town (P)	24	9	5	10	33	44	−11	23	Promoted to Division Two
9	Daisy Hill (P)	24	6	7	11	21	42	−21	17 (Note: Daisy Hill and Ashton Town had 2 points deducted)	Promoted to Division Two
10	Padiham (P)	24	4	8	12	35	39	−4	16	Promoted to Division Two
11	Nantwich Town (P)	24	5	6	13	26	42	−16	16	Promoted to Division Two
12	Ashton Town (P)	24	4	9	11	29	39	−10	15	Promoted to Division Two
13	Whitworth Valley (P)	24	3	5	16	17	48	−31	11	Promoted to Division Two

Source: NWCFL: Final Tables, Season 1986/87
Rules for classification: The points system until the 1990–91 season: 2 points for a win, 1 point for a draw and 0 points for losing.
(C) Champions; (P) Promoted

=== Divisional Cup ===
Owing to the low number of clubs in Division Three a subsidiary cup competition was organised for its members. In the final Ford Motors beat Maghull 4–2 in a deciding penalty shoot-out after the match, played at Burscough F.C., finished 0–0 after extra time.

== League Challenge Cup ==
The 1986–87 League Challenge Cup was a knockout competition open all the league's clubs. The winners were Colne Dynamoes of Division Two who defeated Division One club Leyland Motors in the final, played at Bury F.C., 6–5 on penalties after the match finished 1–1 after extra time (1–1 at 90 minutes).

Semi-finals and Final

The semi-finals were decided on aggregate score from two legs played

Semi-finals
Colne Dynamoes (D2)	0	1	1
Ashton United (D2)	0	0	0
Leyland Motors (D1)	3	0	3
Droylsden (D2)	2	0	2

Final (Note: Played at Bury F.C.)
Colne Dynamoes (D2)	1 (Note: After extra time, score at 90 minutes: 1–1)	6p (Note: Penalties)
Leyland Motors (D1)	1	5p

Club's division appended to team name: (D1)=Division One; (D2)=Division Two
sources:

- Semi-finals: "(column 6) • Bass North West Counties…". Manchester Evening News. Manchester. 5 May 1987. p. 42.
- Final: Andrew Spencer (15 May 1987). "Cup Triumph for Dynamos". Barnoldswick & Earby Times. Wigan. p. 24.

== Reserves Section ==
Main honours for the 1986–87 season:

- Reserves Division
  - Winners: Radcliffe Borough Reserves
  - Runners-up: Warrington Town Reserves
- Reserves Division Cup
  - Winners: Salford Reserves
  - Runners-up: Maghull Reserves
