= 1987–88 North West Counties Football League =

The 1987–88 North West Counties Football League (known as the Bass North West Counties League for sponsorship reasons) was the sixth in the history of the North West Counties Football League, a football competition in England.

The league comprised two divisions (at levels 8 and 9 of the English football league system), reduced from three of the previous season owing to the movement of clubs to the expanded Northern Premier League. There was additionally the League Challenge Cup knockout competition (known as the Raab Karcher Cup for sponsorship reasons for the first occasion this season) open to all the league's clubs and also a reserves team section.

== Division One ==
North West Counties Football League Division One
- Season: 1987–88
- Teams: 18
- Champions: Colne Dynamoes
- Promoted: Colne Dynamoes
- Relegated: Glossop
- Matches: 306
- Goals: 881 (2.88 per match)

Division One, reconstituted after the loss of 12 clubs to the Northern Premier League, featured 18 clubs: 8 remaining from the previous season plus 10 from Division Two: the additional clubs comprised the runners-up Warrington Town who occupied a promotion position and a further 9 who were selected not solely on the basis of their position in the final table but also having the necessary ground grading. The 10 additional clubs were:

- Warrington Town, promoted as runners-up
- Atherton Laburnum Rovers
- Colne Dynamoes
- Colwyn Bay
- Darwen
- Ellesmere Port & Neston
- Formby
- Prescot Cables
- Salford
- Skelmersdale United

At the end of the season the champions Colne Dynamoes (new to Division One this season), who created a league record for the least goals conceded over a season (14 goals from 34 matches), were elected to the Northern Premier League Division One. Only one club, Glossop, were relegated to Division Two.

=== League table ===
Pos	Team	Pld	W	D	L	GF	GA	GD	Pts	Season End Notes
1	Colne Dynamoes (C, P)	34	24	7	3	71	14	+57	55	Promoted to Northern Premier; League Division One
2	Rossendale United	34	24	7	3	68	23	+45	55	
3	Clitheroe	34	18	10	6	51	20	+31	46	
4	Colwyn Bay	34	20	7	7	60	42	+18	45 (Note: Colwyn Bay and Prescot Cables had 2 points deducted)	
5	St Helens Town	34	18	6	10	61	36	+25	42	
6	Ellesmere Port & Neston	34	17	5	12	55	48	+7	39	
7	Darwen	34	14	10	10	55	45	+10	38	
8	Warrington Town	34	16	5	13	68	47	+21	37	
9	Kirkby Town	34	11	13	10	57	54	+3	35	
10	Burscough	34	14	7	13	45	51	−6	35	
11	Leyland Motors	34	10	11	13	53	53	0	31	
12	Prescot Cables	34	10	11	13	34	45	−11	29	
13	Bootle	34	12	5	17	43	61	−18	29	
14	Formby	34	6	10	18	32	63	−31	22	
15	Salford	34	8	6	20	33	66	−33	22	
16	Skelmersdale United	34	4	11	19	34	64	−30	19	
17	Atherton Laburnum Rovers	34	4	7	23	31	78	−47	15	
18	Glossop (R)	34	5	4	25	30	71	−41	14	Relegated to Division Two

Source: NWCFL: Final Tables, Season 1987/88
Rules for classification: The points system until the 1990–91 season: 2 points for a win, 1 point for a draw and 0 points for losing.
(C) Champions; (P) Promoted; (R) Relegated

== Division Two ==
North West Counties Football League Division Two
- Season: 1987–88
- Teams: 22
- Champions: Ashton United
- Promoted: Ashton United; Flixton
- Matches: 462
- Goals: 1,353 (2.93 per match)

Division Two featured 22 clubs: 6 remaining from the previous season plus 16 additional: 13 from the now discontinued Division Three plus 3 clubs new to the league.

The 13 clubs from the previous season's Division Three were:

- Atherton Collieries, promoted as champions
- Flixton, promoted as runners-up
- Ashton Town
- Bacup Borough
- Cheadle Town
- Daisy Hill
- Ford Motors
- Maghull
- Nantwich Town
- Nelson
- Newton
- Padiham
- Whitworth Valley

The 3 clubs new to the league were:

- Newcastle Town, joined from the Mid-Cheshire League
- Maine Road, joined from the Manchester League
- Vauxhall GM, joined from the West Cheshire League (where they had been known as Vauxhall Motors)

At the end of the season two clubs were promoted to Division One: the champions Ashton United and runners-up Flixton (taking that position in their division for a second successive season). Ashton United who scored 107 goals from 42 matches became the second Division Two club to score in excess of 100 goals in a season (the first being Radcliffe Borough scoring 110 from 38 matches over the 1982–83 season). The league continued to enforce minimum standards for members grounds and consequently three clubs, Whitworth Valley, Nelson and Ford Motors were expelled.

=== League table ===
Pos	Team	Pld	W	D	L	GF	GA	GD	Pts	Season End Notes
1	Ashton United (C, P)	42	32	6	4	107	30	+77	70	Promoted to Division One
2	Flixton (P)	42	27	10	5	94	38	+56	64	Promoted to Division One
3	Wren Rovers	42	26	9	7	92	51	+41	61	
4	Newcastle Town	42	26	7	9	81	39	+42	59	
5	Maine Road	42	23	4	15	74	48	+26	50	
6	Maghull	42	18	11	13	73	66	+7	47	
7	Vauxhall GM	42	15	16	11	58	50	+8	46	
8	Atherton Collieries	42	20	6	16	63	63	0	46	
9	Whitworth Valley	42	15	12	15	50	60	−10	42	Expelled (ground substandard)
10	Ashton Town	42	17	8	17	64	70	−6	40 (Note: Ashton Town, Cheadle Town, Great Harwood Town, Padiham and Newton had 2 points deducted)	
11	Oldham Town	42	13	11	18	44	51	−7	37	
12	Cheadle Town	42	13	11	18	47	62	−15	35	
13	Chadderton	42	13	9	20	55	71	−16	35	
14	Great Harwood Town	42	14	8	20	52	66	−14	34	
15	Blackpool Mechanics	42	12	10	20	57	77	−20	34	
16	Nelson	42	12	10	20	49	76	−27	34	Expelled (ground substandard)
17	Ford Motors	42	12	9	21	59	70	−11	33	Expelled (ground substandard)
18	Daisy Hill	42	12	8	22	55	66	−11	32	
19	Padiham	42	10	14	18	53	76	−23	32	
20	Newton	42	10	12	20	47	84	−37	30	
21	Nantwich Town	42	8	13	21	41	68	−27	29	
22	Bacup Borough	42	8	8	26	38	71	−33	24	

Source: NWCFL: Final Tables, Season 1987/88
Rules for classification: The points system until the 1990–91 season: 2 points for a win, 1 point for a draw and 0 points for losing.
(C) Champions; (P) Promoted

== League Challenge Cup ==
The 1987–88 League Challenge Cup (known as the Raab Karcher Cup for sponsorship reasons for the first occasion this season) was a knockout competition open to all the league's clubs. The winner from the final contested by Division One clubs played at Bury F.C. were Warrington Town who defeated Colwyn Bay 3–1. Warrington Town were the first two time winners of the cup having triumphed two years previously.

Semi-finals and Final

The semi-finals were decided on aggregate score from two legs played

Semi-finals
Daisy Hill (D2)	2	1	3
Colwyn Bay (D1)	0	4	4
Warrington Town (D1)	3	1	4
St Helens Town (D1)	1	0	1

Final (Note: Played at Bury F.C.)
Colwyn Bay (D1)	1
Warrington Town (D1)	3

Club's division appended to team name: (D1)=Division One; (D2)=Division Two
sources:

- Semi-finals: "Warrington cruise in". Daily Post. Liverpool. 21 March 1988. p. 27. & "Bay aim sights on cup triumph". North Wales Weekly News. Llandudno Junction. 7 April 1988. p. 84.
- Final: "Town flier Steve!". Manchester Evening News. Manchester. 13 May 1988. p. 71.

== Reserves Section ==
Main honours for the 1987–88 season:

- Reserves Division
  - Winners: Maghull Reserves
  - Runners-up: Rossendale United Reserves
- Reserves Division Cup
  - Winners: Flixton Reserves
  - Runners-up: Clitheroe Reserves
