= 1985–86 North West Counties Football League =

North West Counties Football League
- Season: 1985–86

The 1985–86 North West Counties Football League was the fourth in the history of the North West Counties Football League, a football competition in England. The League comprised three divisions and there was additionally the League Challenge Cup knockout competition open to all clubs and a reserves team section.

== Division One ==
North West Counties Football League Division One
- Season: 1985–86
- Teams: 20
- Champions: Clitheroe
- Relegated: Prescot Cables; Formby
- Matches: 380
- Goals: 1,066 (2.81 per match)

Division One featured 20 clubs, 18 remaining from the previous season plus 2 additional (both promoted from Division Two):

- Clitheroe as champions
- Irlam Town as runners-up

At the end of the season the champions Clitheroe (who had over the previous two seasons been Division Three and Division Two champions) were unable to achieve their third successive promotion owing to lack of floodlights at their ground; the two bottom clubs Prescot Cables and Formby were relegated to Division Two.

=== League table ===
Pos	Team	Pld	W	D	L	GF	GA	GD	Pts	Season End Notes
1	Clitheroe (C)	38	20	14	4	61	30	+31	54	
2	Congleton Town	38	22	10	6	51	29	+22	54	
3	Eastwood Hanley	38	22	9	7	68	45	+23	53	
4	Stalybridge Celtic	38	21	10	7	62	39	+23	52	
5	Fleetwood Town	38	21	10	7	70	34	+36	50 (Note: Fleetwood Town had 2 points deducted.)	
6	Irlam Town	38	16	14	8	66	45	+21	46	
7	Leek Town	38	20	6	12	64	44	+20	46	
8	Curzon Ashton	38	18	9	11	52	50	+2	45	
9	Burscough	38	15	10	13	45	35	+10	40	
10	St Helens Town	38	15	8	15	65	55	+10	38	
11	Accrington Stanley	38	13	11	14	62	60	+2	37	
12	Leyland Motors	38	13	8	17	62	67	−5	34	
13	Winsford United	38	14	6	18	55	68	−13	34	
14	Radcliffe Borough	38	12	9	17	48	49	−1	33	
15	Bootle	38	11	7	20	46	54	−8	29	
16	Penrith	38	9	8	21	46	63	−17	26	
17	Netherfield	38	8	10	20	38	76	−38	26	
18	Glossop	38	7	10	21	37	69	−32	24	
19	Prescot Cables (R)	38	5	9	24	33	68	−35	19	Relegated to Division Two
20	Formby (R)	38	5	8	25	35	86	−51	18	Relegated to Division Two

Source: NWCFL: Final Tables, Season 1985/86
Rules for classification: The points system until the 1990–91 season: 2 points for a win, 1 point for a draw and 0 points for losing.
(C) Champions; (R) Relegated

== Division Two ==
North West Counties Football League Division Two
- Season: 1985–86
- Teams: 18
- Champions: Kirkby Town
- Promoted: Kirkby Town; Rossendale United
- Relegated: Ford Motors; Nantwich Town
- Matches: 306
- Goals: 981 (3.21 per match)

Division Two featured 18 clubs, 15 remaining from the previous season plus 3 additional:

- Lancaster City, relegated on ground grading criteria from DivisionOne
- Kirkby Town promoted as champions from Division Three, returning to the division from which they had been expelled two years previously
- Colwyn Bay promoted as runners-up from Division Three

Club movements at the end of the season were straightforward with the champions Kirkby Town (with their second successive promotion) and runners-up Rossendale United promoted to Division One and going in the other direction the two bottom clubs, Ford Motors and Nantwich Town, were relegated to Division Three.

=== League table ===
Pos	Team	Pld	W	D	L	GF	GA	GD	Pts	Season End Notes
1	Kirkby Town (C, P)	34	24	7	3	85	30	+55	55	Promoted to Division One
2	Rossendale United (P)	34	20	8	6	81	36	+45	48	Promoted to Division One
3	Wren Rovers	34	18	8	8	60	46	+14	44	
4	Warrington Town	34	17	9	8	62	48	+14	43	
5	Colwyn Bay	34	17	8	9	74	53	+21	42	
6	Chadderton	34	15	12	7	66	48	+18	42	
7	Colne Dynamoes	34	15	9	10	59	43	+16	39	
8	Great Harwood Town	34	13	10	11	38	45	−7	36	
9	Skelmersdale United	34	14	5	15	58	53	+5	33	
10	Droylsden	34	13	7	14	48	56	−8	33	
11	Atherton Laburnum Rovers	34	12	6	16	49	61	−12	30	
12	Lancaster City	34	10	9	15	57	66	−9	29	
13	Ellesmere Port & Neston	34	9	9	16	45	61	−16	27	
14	Ashton United	34	11	5	18	46	64	−18	26 (Note: Ashton United had 1 point deducted.)	
15	Darwen	34	8	8	18	48	57	−9	24	
16	Salford	34	9	4	21	38	72	−34	22	
17	Ford Motors (R)	34	5	10	19	36	64	−28	20	Relegated to Division Three
18	Nantwich Town (R)	34	5	8	21	31	78	−47	18	Relegated to Division Three

Source: NWCFL: Final Tables, Season 1985/86
Rules for classification: The points system until the 1990–91 season: 2 points for a win, 1 point for a draw and 0 points for losing.
(C) Champions; (P) Promoted; (R) Relegated

== Division Three ==
North West Counties Football League Division Three
- Season: 1985–86
- Teams: 15
- Champions: Blackpool Mechanics
- Promoted: Blackpool Mechanics; Oldham Town
- Matches: 210
- Goals: 708 (3.37 per match)

Division Three featured 15 clubs, 13 remaining from the previous season plus 2 additional:

- Padiham, relegated on ground grading criteria from Division Two
- Huyton Town, a newly formed club

Oldham Dew changed their name to Oldham Town

At the end of the season the two top clubs, the champions Blackpool Mechanics and runners-up Oldham Town were promoted to Division Two. Four other clubs left the division; three clubs, Prestwich Heys, Huyton Town and Ashton Athletic were expelled from the league as their grounds were ruled below the required standard and the Bolton ST club folded.

=== League table ===
Pos	Team	Pld	W	D	L	GF	GA	GD	Pts	Season End Notes
1	Blackpool Mechanics (C, P)	28	22	2	4	77	33	+44	44 (Note: Blackpool Mechanics, Bolton ST and Nelson had 2 points deducted.)	Promoted to Division Two
2	Oldham Town (P)	28	14	9	5	56	29	+27	37	Promoted to Division Two
3	Maghull	28	15	6	7	62	36	+26	36	
4	Daisy Hill	28	13	7	8	62	45	+17	33	
5	Atherton Collieries	28	13	7	8	48	37	+11	33	
6	Bolton ST	28	12	7	9	42	34	+8	29	Resigned (folded)
7	Cheadle Town	28	9	10	9	42	26	+16	28	
8	Bacup Borough	28	10	8	10	36	40	−4	28	
9	Padiham	28	8	10	10	44	45	−1	26	
10	Prestwich Heys	28	10	6	12	53	66	−13	26	Expelled (ground substandard)
11	Newton	28	7	10	11	43	48	−5	24	
12	Whitworth Valley	28	7	8	13	42	48	−6	22	
13	Huyton Town	28	7	7	14	41	71	−30	21	Expelled (ground substandard)
14	Nelson	28	7	7	14	36	65	−29	19	
15	Ashton Athletic	28	1	6	21	24	85	−61	8	Expelled (ground substandard)

Source: NWCFL: Final Tables, Season 1985/86
Rules for classification: The points system until the 1990–91 season: 2 points for a win, 1 point for a draw and 0 points for losing.
(C) Champions; (P) Promoted

=== Divisional Cup ===
Owing to the reduced number of clubs in the division a subsidiary cup competition, sponsored by Luxor, was organised for its members. Over the two-legged final Atherton Collieries beat Newton 5–2 on aggregate (0–2 at Newton; 5–0 at Atherton).

== League Challenge Cup ==
The 1985–86 League Challenge Cup was a knockout competition open to all clubs in the League. The winners were Warrington Town of Division Two who defeated First Division champions Clitheroe 2–0 in the final played at Bury F.C.

Semi-finals and Final

The semi-finals were decided on aggregate score from two legs played

Semi-finals
Clitheroe (D1)	2	1	3
Stalybridge Celtic (D1)	1	0	1
Warrington Town (D2)	2	3	5
Rossendale United (D2)	1	3	4

Final (Note: Played at Bury F.C.)
Clitheroe (D1)	0
Warrington Town (D2)	2

Club's division appended to team name: (D1)=Division One; (D2)=Division Two
source: NWCFL: All Results, 1985/86 Season

== Reserves Section ==
Main honours for the 1985–86 season:

- Reserves Division
  - Winners: Chadderton Reserves
  - Runners-up: St Helens Town Reserves
- Reserves Division Cup
  - Winners: Irlam Town Reserves
  - Runners-up: Curzon Ashton Reserves
