= 1984–85 North West Counties Football League =

North West Counties Football League
- Season: 1984–85

The 1984–85 North West Counties Football League was the third in the history of the North West Counties Football League, a football competition in England. The League comprised three divisions and there was additionally the League Challenge Cup knockout competition open to all clubs and a reserves team section.

== Division One ==
North West Counties Football League Division One
- Season: 1984–85
- Teams: 20
- Champions: Radcliffe Borough
- Promoted: Caernarfon Town
- Relegated: Lancaster City
- Matches: 380
- Goals: 1,174 (3.09 per match)

Division One featured 20 clubs, 18 remaining from the previous season plus 2 additional (both promoted from Division Two):

- Fleetwood Town as champions
- Eastwood Hanley as runners-up

At the end of the season the champions Radcliffe Borough were unable to seek promotion owing to lack of floodlights at their ground. but runners-up Caernarfon Town were elected to the Northern Premier League. Next to bottom club Lancaster City were demoted to Division Two as their ground was ruled below the required standard for Division One whilst bottom club Penrith were repreived from relegation.

=== League table ===
Pos	Team	Pld	W	D	L	GF	GA	GD	Pts	Season End Notes
1	Radcliffe Borough (C)	38	24	10	4	67	33	+34	58	
2	Caernarfon Town (P)	38	23	9	6	73	40	+33	55	Promoted to Northern Premier League
3	Burscough	38	23	7	8	81	46	+35	53	
4	Stalybridge Celtic	38	21	10	7	89	40	+49	52	
5	Eastwood Hanley	38	20	12	6	72	42	+30	52	
6	Curzon Ashton	38	21	6	11	85	60	+25	48	
7	Winsford United	38	20	7	11	58	37	+21	47	
8	Fleetwood Town	38	18	8	12	84	57	+27	44	
9	Leek Town	38	16	11	11	52	38	+14	43	
10	Congleton Town	38	13	11	14	46	49	−3	37	
11	Leyland Motors	38	13	8	17	52	67	−15	34	
12	St Helens Town	38	12	9	17	64	75	−11	33	
13	Prescot Cables	38	13	7	18	64	68	−4	31 (Note: Prescot Cables and Formby had 2 points deducted.)	
14	Bootle	38	10	11	17	34	48	−14	31	
15	Accrington Stanley	38	11	8	19	45	59	−14	30	
16	Glossop	38	8	11	19	46	70	−24	27	
17	Formby	38	9	9	20	41	79	−38	25	
18	Netherfield	38	7	9	22	42	80	−38	23	
19	Lancaster City (R)	38	8	5	25	46	90	−44	21	Relegated (ground grading) to Division Two
20	Penrith	38	4	4	30	36	99	−63	12	Repreived from relegated

Source: NWCFL: Final Tables, Season 1984/85
Rules for classification: The points system up until the 1990–91 season: 2 points for a win, 1 point for a draw and 0 points for losing.
(C) Champions; (P) Promoted; (R) Relegated

== Division Two ==
North West Counties Football League Division Two
- Season: 1984–85
- Teams: 18
- Champions: Clitheroe
- Promoted: Clitheroe; Irlam Town
- Relegated: Padiham
- Matches: 306
- Goals: 870 (2.84 per match)

Division Two featured 18 clubs, 14 remaining from the previous season plus 4 additional:

- Ashton United, relegated from Division One
- Darwen, relegated from Division One
- Clitheroe promoted as champions from Division Three
- Padiham promoted as runners-up from Division Three

At the end of the season the two top clubs, champions Clitheroe (with their second successive promotion as champions) and runners-up Irlam Town were promoted to Division One. Next to bottom club Padiham, who had been promoted into the division this season, were demoted to Division Three as their ground was ruled below the required standard for Division Two whilst bottom club Ellesmere Port & Neston were repreived from relegation.

=== League table ===
Pos	Team	Pld	W	D	L	GF	GA	GD	Pts	Season End Notes
1	Clitheroe (C, P)	34	19	13	2	70	33	+37	51	Promoted to Division One
2	Irlam Town (P)	34	21	9	4	60	24	+36	51	Promoted to Division One
3	Warrington Town	34	17	14	3	59	29	+30	48	
4	Ashton United	34	17	7	10	56	55	+1	41	
5	Droylsden	34	15	10	9	51	47	+4	40	
6	Wren Rovers	34	15	9	10	53	41	+12	39	
7	Great Harwood Town	34	17	4	13	49	44	+5	38	
8	Chadderton	34	13	9	12	47	46	+1	35	
9	Colne Dynamoes	34	9	14	11	45	40	+5	32	
10	Atherton Laburnum Rovers	34	13	6	15	42	43	−1	32	
11	Nantwich Town	34	13	5	16	50	47	+3	31	
12	Ford Motors	34	11	8	15	44	45	−1	30	
13	Skelmersdale United	34	11	8	15	39	56	−17	30	
14	Rossendale United	34	10	9	15	51	53	−2	29	
15	Salford	34	11	5	18	46	64	−18	27	
16	Darwen	34	7	6	21	32	62	−30	20	
17	Padiham (R)	34	8	5	21	42	74	−32	19 (Note: Padiham and Ellesmere Port & Neston had 2 points deducted.)	Relegated (ground grading) to Division Three
18	Ellesmere Port & Neston	34	5	7	22	34	67	−33	15	Repreived from relegated

Source: NWCFL: Final Tables, Season 1984/85
Rules for classification: The points system up until the 1990–91 season: 2 points for a win, 1 point for a draw and 0 points for losing.
(C) Champions; (P) Promoted; (R) Relegated

== Division Three ==
North West Counties Football League Division Three
- Season: 1984–85
- Teams: 18
- Champions: Kirkby Town
- Promoted: Kirkby Town; Colwyn Bay
- Matches: 306
- Goals: 964 (3.15 per match)

Division Three featured 18 clubs, 15 remaining from the previous season plus 3 additional:

- Lytham, relegated on ground grading criteria from Division Two
- Kirkby Town, re-admitted with an uprated ground
- Colwyn Bay, joined from Welsh League North

At the end of the season the two top clubs, the champions Kirkby Town and runners-up Colwyn Bay were promoted to Division Two. Three clubs, Urmston Town, Lytham and Ashton Town were expelled from the league as their grounds were ruled below the required standard.

=== League table ===
Pos	Team	Pld	W	D	L	GF	GA	GD	Pts	Season End Notes
1	Kirkby Town (C, P)	34	26	5	3	83	30	+53	57	Promoted to Division Two
2	Colwyn Bay (P)	34	22	10	2	75	32	+43	54	Promoted to Division Two
3	Newton	34	16	10	8	56	33	+23	42	
4	Urmston Town	34	14	10	10	42	39	+3	38	Expelled (ground substandard)
5	Blackpool Mechanics	34	15	7	12	61	48	+13	37	
6	Lytham	34	14	7	13	54	45	+9	35	Expelled (ground substandard)
7	Atherton Collieries	34	13	8	13	44	44	0	34	
8	Ashton Town	34	13	7	14	62	56	+6	33	Expelled (ground substandard)
9	Oldham Dew	34	11	10	13	51	44	+7	32	
10	Bolton ST	34	12	8	14	55	73	−18	32	
11	Maghull	34	12	7	15	56	51	+5	31	
12	Cheadle Town	34	12	7	15	46	62	−16	31	
13	Bacup Borough	34	11	8	15	54	59	−5	30	
14	Ashton Athletic	34	12	6	16	45	61	−16	30	
15	Daisy Hill	34	10	9	15	51	61	−10	27 (Note: Daisy Hill and Prestwich Heys had 2 points deducted.)	
16	Whitworth Valley	34	10	7	17	51	71	−20	27	
17	Nelson	34	9	4	21	43	80	−37	22	
18	Prestwich Heys	34	7	4	23	35	75	−40	16	

Source: NWCFL: Final Tables, Season 1984/85
Rules for classification: The points system up until the 1990–91 season: 2 points for a win, 1 point for a draw and 0 points for losing.
(C) Champions; (P) Promoted

== League Challenge Cup ==
The 1984–85 League Challenge Cup was a knockout competition open to all clubs in the League. The winners from an all Division One club final were Leek Town who defeated the season's Division One champions Radcliffe Borough in the final, played at Bury F.C., 5–4 on penalties after the match finished 1–1 after extra time (1–1 at 90 minutes).

Semi-finals and Final

Semi-finals
Leek Town (D1)	2
Congleton Town (D1)	1
Radcliffe Borough (D1)	1
Clitheroe (D2)	0

Final (Note: Played at Bury F.C.)
Leek Town (D1)	1 (Note: After extra time, score at 90 minutes: 1–1)	5p (Note: Penalties)
Radcliffe Borough (D1)	1	4p

Club's division appended to team name: (D1)=Division One; (D2)=Division Two
source: NWCFL: All Results, 1984/85 Season

== Reserves Section ==
Main honours for the 1984–85 season:

- Reserves Division
  - Winners: Curzon Ashton Reserves
  - Runners-up: Warrington Town Reserves
- Reserves Division Cup
  - Winners: Curzon Ashton Reserves
  - Runners-up: Oldham Dew Reserves
