= 1979–80 Cheshire County Football League =

Cheshire County League
- Season: 1979–80

The 1979–80 Cheshire County Football League was the 56th in the history of the Cheshire County League, a football competition in England. Teams were divided into two divisions.

== Division One ==
Cheshire County Football League Division One
- Season: 1979–80
- Champions: Stalybridge Celtic
- Relegated: Rhyl; Radcliffe Borough

The division featured two new teams, both promoted from last season's Division Two:

- Bootle (1st)
- Curzon Ashton (2nd)

=== League table ===
Pos	Team	Pld	W	D	L	GF	GA	GD	Pts	Relegation
1	Stalybridge Celtic (C)	38	26	7	5	94	46	+48	59	
2	Winsford United	38	23	6	9	72	41	+31	52	
3	Chorley	38	20	11	7	60	35	+25	51	
4	Ashton United	38	15	15	8	71	65	+6	45	
5	Burscough	38	16	11	11	67	54	+13	43	
6	Hyde United	38	16	10	12	60	48	+12	42	
7	Droylsden	38	15	10	13	63	45	+18	40	
8	Horwich RMI	38	13	12	13	53	52	+1	38	
9	Curzon Ashton	38	11	14	13	48	55	−7	36	
10	Darwen	38	12	12	14	41	52	−11	36	
11	Rossendale United	38	12	12	14	48	73	−25	36	
12	St Helens Town	38	10	15	13	59	55	+4	35	
13	Bootle	38	14	7	17	50	53	−3	35	
14	Nantwich Town	38	14	7	17	53	62	−9	35	
15	New Mills	38	11	13	14	44	57	−13	35	
16	Formby	38	13	7	18	50	58	−8	33	
17	Fleetwood Town	38	10	11	17	51	63	−12	31	
18	Leek Town	38	10	9	19	45	66	−21	29	
19	Rhyl (R)	38	10	7	21	54	66	−12	27	Relegation to Division Two
20	Radcliffe Borough (R)	38	6	10	22	45	82	−37	22	Relegation to Division Two

Rules for classification: 1) points; 2) goal difference; 3) number of goals scored.
The points system until the 1990–91 season: 2 points for a win, 1 point for a draw and 0 points for losing.
(C) Champions; (R) Relegated

== Division Two ==
Cheshire County Football League Division Two
- Season: 1979–80
- Champions: Prescot Town
- Promoted: Prescot Town; Kirkby Town

The division featured two new teams, both relegated from last season's Division One:

- New Brighton (21st)
- Middlewich Athletic (22nd)

=== League table ===
Pos	Team	Pld	W	D	L	GF	GA	GD	Pts	Promotion
1	Prescot Town (C, P)	34	22	7	5	89	25	+64	51	Promotion to Division One
2	Accrington Stanley	34	20	9	5	67	33	+34	49	
3	Kirkby Town (P)	34	23	3	8	70	40	+30	49	Promotion to Division One
4	Prescot BI	34	19	7	8	77	54	+23	45	
5	Congleton Town	34	18	8	8	61	42	+19	44	
6	Eastwood Hanley	34	15	10	9	65	44	+21	40	
7	Glossop	34	14	7	13	53	45	+8	35	
8	Maghull	34	12	10	12	49	49	0	34	
9	Ford Motors	34	13	6	15	48	44	+4	32	
10	New Brighton	34	13	6	15	59	63	−4	32	
11	Atherton Collieries	34	9	14	11	44	48	−4	32	
12	Irlam Town	34	12	7	15	48	49	−1	31	
13	Middlewich Athletic	34	12	6	16	55	64	−9	30	
14	Skelmersdale United	34	9	10	15	46	69	−23	28	
15	Warrington Town	34	9	6	19	48	80	−32	24	
16	Prestwich Heys	34	8	6	20	36	71	−35	22	
17	Ashton Town	34	3	12	19	35	83	−48	18	
18	Anson Villa	34	5	6	23	29	76	−47	16	Merged with Salford Amateurs

Rules for classification: 1) points; 2) goal difference; 3) number of goals scored.
The points system until the 1990–91 season: 2 points for a win, 1 point for a draw and 0 points for losing.
(C) Champions; (P) Promoted
