= 1980–81 Cheshire County Football League =

Cheshire County League
- Season: 1980–81

The 1980–81 Cheshire County Football League was the 57th in the history of the Cheshire County League, a football competition in England. Teams were divided into two divisions.

== Division One ==
Cheshire County Football League Division One
- Season: 1980–81
- Champions: Nantwich Town
- Relegated: Kirkby Town; New Mills

The division featured two new teams, both promoted from last season's Division Two:

- Prescot Town (1st), changed their name to Prescot Cables
- Kirkby Town (3rd)

=== League table ===
Pos	Team	Pld	W	D	L	GF	GA	GD	Pts	Relegation
1	Nantwich Town (C)	38	26	6	6	87	34	+53	58	
2	Hyde United	38	23	9	6	75	27	+48	55	
3	Winsford United	38	20	10	8	75	38	+37	50	
4	Formby	38	21	7	10	65	39	+26	49	
5	Stalybridge Celtic	38	16	15	7	62	50	+12	47	
6	Chorley	38	17	11	10	65	48	+17	45	
7	Bootle	38	18	7	13	68	53	+15	43	
8	Prescot Cables	38	16	9	13	60	46	+14	41	
9	Horwich RMI	38	15	9	14	53	49	+4	39	
10	Leek Town	38	15	9	14	50	47	+3	39	
11	Ashton United	38	12	12	14	70	73	−3	36	
12	Curzon Ashton	38	14	8	16	48	63	−15	36	
13	St Helens Town	38	14	7	17	63	82	−19	35	
14	Fleetwood Town	38	9	13	16	33	53	−20	31	
15	Rossendale United	38	9	12	17	49	69	−20	30	
16	Burscough	38	11	6	21	52	62	−10	28	
17	Darwen	38	8	10	20	46	74	−28	26	
18	Droylsden	38	9	8	21	49	82	−33	26	
19	Kirkby Town (R)	38	6	11	21	30	65	−35	23	Relegation to Division Two
20	New Mills (R)	38	8	7	23	34	80	−46	23	Relegation to Division Two

Rules for classification: 1) points; 2) goal difference; 3) number of goals scored.
The points system until the 1990–91 season: 2 points for a win, 1 point for a draw and 0 points for losing.
(C) Champions; (R) Relegated

== Division Two ==
Cheshire County Football League Division Two
- Season: 1980–81
- Champions: Accrington Stanley
- Promoted: Accrington Stanley; Glossop

The division featured five new teams:

- 2 relegated from the previous season's Division One:
  - Rhyl (19th)
  - Radcliffe Borough (20th)
- 3 joined the division:
  - Leyland Motors, from Lancashire Combination
  - Atherton Laburnum Rovers, from Bolton Combination
  - Salford, merger of Anson Villa and Salford Amateurs

=== League table ===
Pos	Team	Pld	W	D	L	GF	GA	GD	Pts	Promotion or relegation
1	Accrington Stanley (C, P)	38	26	3	9	73	20	+53	55	Promotion to Division One
2	Glossop (P)	38	23	9	6	76	38	+38	55	Promotion to Division One
3	Leyland Motors	38	20	10	8	68	42	+26	50	
4	Middlewich Athletic	38	20	10	8	56	32	+24	50	
5	Atherton Laburnum Rovers	38	19	11	8	61	39	+22	49	
6	Prescot BI	38	20	5	13	59	40	+19	45	
7	Rhyl	38	20	5	13	69	57	+12	45	
8	Maghull	38	15	12	11	55	41	+14	42	
9	Ford Motors	38	16	9	13	49	52	−3	41	
10	Congleton Town	38	16	8	14	67	55	+12	40	
11	Radcliffe Borough	38	15	10	13	58	48	+10	40	
12	Irlam Town	38	15	6	17	49	51	−2	36	
13	Warrington Town	38	15	5	18	59	78	−19	35	
14	Prestwich Heys	38	15	4	19	66	68	−2	34	
15	Salford	38	9	13	16	50	70	−20	31	
16	Eastwood Hanley	38	12	6	20	47	55	−8	30	
17	Skelmersdale United	38	9	10	19	51	68	−17	28	
18	Atherton Collieries	38	8	5	25	39	83	−44	21	
19	Ashton Town	38	6	5	27	40	93	−53	17	
20	New Brighton	38	6	4	28	31	93	−62	16	Resigned

Rules for classification: 1) points; 2) goal difference; 3) number of goals scored.
The points system until the 1990–91 season: 2 points for a win, 1 point for a draw and 0 points for losing.
(C) Champions; (P) Promoted
