= 1987–88 Northern Premier League =

The 1987–88 Northern Premier League season was the 20th in the history of the Northern Premier League, a football competition in England. Teams were divided into two divisions.

== Premier Division ==
Northern Premier League Premier Division
- Season: 1987–88
- Champions: Chorley
- Promoted: Chorley
- Relegated: Oswestry Town; Workington
- Matches: 462
- Goals: 1,349 (2.92 per match)

The Premier Division featured two new teams:

- Frickley Athletic relegated from Football Conference
- Gateshead relegated from Football Conference

=== League table ===
Pos	Team	Pld	W	D	L	GF	GA	GD	Pts	Qualification or relegation
1	Chorley (C, P)	42	26	10	6	78	35	+43	88	Promoted to Football Conference
2	Hyde United	42	25	10	7	91	52	+39	85	
3	Caernarfon Town	42	22	10	10	56	34	+22	76	
4	Morecambe	42	19	15	8	61	41	+20	72	
5	Barrow	42	21	8	13	70	41	+29	71	
6	Worksop Town	42	20	11	11	74	55	+19	71	
7	Bangor City	42	20	10	12	72	55	+17	70	
8	Rhyl	42	18	13	11	70	42	+28	67	
9	Marine	42	19	10	13	67	45	+22	67	
10	Frickley Athletic	42	18	11	13	61	55	+6	65	
11	Witton Albion	42	16	12	14	61	47	+14	60	
12	Goole Town	42	17	9	16	71	61	+10	60	
13	Horwich RMI	42	17	9	16	46	42	+4	60	
14	Southport	42	15	12	15	43	48	−5	57	
15	South Liverpool	42	10	19	13	56	64	−8	49	
16	Buxton	42	11	14	17	72	76	−4	47	
17	Mossley	42	11	11	20	54	75	−21	44	
18	Gateshead	42	11	7	24	52	71	−19	40	
19	Matlock Town	42	10	8	24	58	89	−31	38	
20	Gainsborough Trinity	42	8	10	24	38	81	−43	34	
21	Oswestry Town	42	6	10	26	44	101	−57	28	Club Folded
22	Workington (R)	42	6	3	33	28	113	−85	21	Relegated to Division One

(C) Champions; (P) Promoted; (R) Relegated

=== Results ===
Home \ Away	BAN	BRW	BUX	CNR	CHO	FRK	GAI	GAT	GOO	HOR	HYD	MAR	MAT	MOR	MOS	OSW	RHL	SLI	SOU	WTN	WRK	WKS
Bangor City		1–0	2–2	0–0	1–1	3–2	1–0	1–3	2–1	0–0	3–4	2–0	2–0	2–4	3–1	2–2	3–0	0–1	1–1	4–0	5–0	2–3
Barrow	2–3		3–1	0–1	1–2	3–0	4–1	2–1	5–0	2–0	2–1	3–2	5–0	0–0	3–2	4–0	2–4	1–1	0–1	1–0	2–0	0–1
Buxton	2–4	2–0		1–3	1–2	1–2	0–0	1–1	2–4	2–1	5–1	1–1	2–1	1–1	1–0	3–3	2–2	0–0	0–1	1–4	3–1	2–2
Caernarfon Town	1–0	0–2	2–1		2–1	0–1	0–0	3–0	2–1	2–4	1–1	1–0	3–1	1–0	3–2	3–0	2–1	2–2	2–1	0–0	3–0	1–0
Chorley	1–0	1–0	4–1	1–0		0–3	2–1	4–0	1–1	1–0	1–1	2–1	0–0	2–1	1–1	5–1	2–1	4–2	2–1	1–1	9–0	0–1
Frickley Athletic	1–2	0–4	1–3	2–1	1–2		3–1	0–0	3–3	0–0	4–2	1–1	1–0	0–2	4–1	3–1	0–1	2–1	2–1	1–0	2–1	3–0
Gainsborough Trinity	0–0	1–1	0–6	0–0	1–6	1–0		1–0	0–3	1–0	1–1	4–1	0–2	2–3	1–2	2–1	0–1	1–2	1–1	1–1	1–2	1–3
Gateshead	1–1	0–0	3–2	0–1	0–2	2–0	4–1		3–1	1–0	0–1	1–3	2–0	1–1	0–3	4–0	0–1	0–2	1–0	1–1	4–0	3–5
Goole Town	1–2	0–2	0–0	1–0	1–0	1–1	2–2	3–2		1–1	0–5	0–1	4–0	2–1	4–2	3–2	3–1	4–0	0–1	3–0	8–1	1–2
Horwich RMI	3–2	1–1	1–0	0–1	0–1	1–2	1–0	2–1	0–2		1–4	0–0	2–0	0–1	1–0	2–1	0–0	1–2	1–1	1–0	2–0	2–0
Hyde United	2–0	2–1	4–2	2–1	2–1	0–0	3–0	2–1	3–1	2–0		1–0	2–0	2–1	4–1	2–0	0–0	3–3	5–1	2–3	6–0	1–1
Marine	2–2	0–1	1–0	0–0	1–0	0–0	5–1	2–0	2–1	1–0	7–3		1–3	1–1	0–1	1–0	4–2	1–0	3–1	0–1	3–0	1–1
Matlock Town	2–3	5–1	3–3	0–2	1–1	2–4	4–2	2–1	2–3	0–4	2–3	1–2		2–3	2–3	2–2	1–1	2–2	2–1	1–3	2–1	2–2
Morecambe	0–2	0–0	2–2	2–0	1–2	0–0	0–0	4–1	2–2	3–2	4–1	3–2	1–0		4–1	2–0	0–0	1–0	0–1	0–0	2–0	2–1
Mossley	1–2	1–1	1–1	1–1	0–1	1–1	1–0	4–1	2–1	0–2	0–4	1–3	1–1	2–2		3–1	1–3	1–0	0–0	0–2	2–1	1–1
Oswestry Town	0–3	1–1	1–4	2–1	0–4	3–3	3–2	1–1	1–0	2–3	0–2	1–7	0–2	1–1	1–2		0–3	0–0	2–0	2–2	2–0	2–4
Rhyl	2–0	1–2	2–1	0–0	0–1	2–1	5–0	2–1	1–0	0–1	1–1	0–1	4–0	0–0	1–1	5–0		1–2	1–2	2–2	3–1	2–1
South Liverpool	0–0	1–1	3–3	0–4	1–1	2–0	1–2	4–1	1–1	1–1	1–1	1–0	4–2	1–1	6–3	2–2	1–3		1–1	0–3	0–2	0–2
Southport	2–3	1–2	2–1	1–1	2–3	1–2	1–0	1–2	0–0	1–0	1–0	0–0	2–0	2–0	1–1	1–0	2–2	1–1		0–4	3–0	0–0
Witton Albion	3–1	1–0	2–3	0–2	1–1	2–0	0–1	3–2	3–1	0–1	1–1	2–2	4–0	0–1	3–2	1–2	0–0	0–0	0–1		3–2	5–1
Workington	0–1	0–4	0–1	1–4	1–2	1–3	2–3	1–0	0–2	2–2	0–2	0–4	0–2	0–1	2–1	2–1	0–8	2–2	0–1	1–0		0–0
Worksop Town	4–1	1–0	5–2	2–0	0–0	2–2	3–1	3–2	0–1	1–2	0–2	2–0	2–4	2–3	1–0	5–0	1–1	2–2	2–0	1–0	4–1	

Updated to match(es) played on 2 May 1988. Source: Northern Premier League Premier Division results grid
Legend: Blue = home team win; Yellow = draw; Red = away team win.

== Division One ==
Northern Premier League Division One
- Season: 1987–88
- Champions: Fleetwood Town
- Promoted: Fleetwood Town; Stalybridge Celtic
- Matches: 344
- Goals: 1,014 (2.95 per match)

It was the first Division One season, it was formed by clubs from:

- 12 clubs joined from the NWCL Division One:
  - Stalybridge Celtic
  - Accrington Stanley
  - Winsford United
  - Fleetwood Town
  - Penrith
  - Congleton Town
  - Eastwood Hanley
  - Radcliffe Borough
  - Leek Town
  - Netherfield
  - Irlam Town
  - Curzon Ashton
- 2 clubs joined from the NWCL Division Two:
  - Droylsden
  - Lancaster City
- 5 clubs joined from the NCEL Premier Division:
  - Alfreton Town
  - Farsley Celtic
  - Sutton Town
  - Harrogate Town
  - Eastwood Town

=== League table ===
Pos	Team	Pld	W	D	L	GF	GA	GD	Pts	Qualification or relegation
1	Fleetwood Town (C, P)	36	22	7	7	85	45	+40	73	Promoted to Premier Division
2	Stalybridge Celtic (P)	36	22	6	8	72	42	+30	72	Promoted to Premier Division
3	Leek Town	36	20	10	6	63	38	+25	70	
4	Accrington Stanley	36	21	6	9	71	39	+32	69	
5	Farsley Celtic	36	18	9	9	64	48	+16	63	
6	Droylsden	36	16	10	10	63	48	+15	58	
7	Eastwood Hanley	36	14	12	10	50	37	+13	54	
8	Winsford United	36	15	6	15	59	47	+12	51	
9	Congleton Town	36	12	16	8	43	39	+4	51 (Note: Congleton Town were docked 1 point.)	
10	Harrogate Town	36	13	9	14	51	50	+1	48	
11	Alfreton Town	36	13	8	15	53	54	−1	47	
12	Radcliffe Borough	36	11	13	12	66	62	+4	46	
13	Irlam Town	36	12	10	14	39	45	−6	46	
14	Penrith	36	11	11	14	46	51	−5	44	
15	Sutton Town	36	11	5	20	51	96	−45	38	
16	Lancaster City	36	10	6	20	45	72	−27	36	
17	Eastwood Town	36	8	10	18	45	65	−20	34	
18	Curzon Ashton	36	8	4	24	43	73	−30	28	
19	Netherfield	36	4	4	28	35	93	−58	16	

Source: rsssf.com
(C) Champions; (P) Promoted

== Promotion and relegation ==
In the twentieth season of the Northern Premier League Chorley (as champions) were automatically promoted to the Football Conference. Meanwhile, Oswestry Town folded at the end of the season and Workington were relegated; these three sides were replaced by Division One winners Fleetwood Town, second placed Stalybridge Celtic and newly admitted Shepshed Charterhouse. Colne Dynamoes, Bishop Auckland, Whitley Bay and Newtown were admitted into Division One at the end of the season.

== Cup Results ==
Challenge Cup:

- Goole Town bt. Barrow

President's Cup:

- South Liverpool 5–4 Southport

Northern Premier League Shield: Between Champions of NPL Premier Division and Winners of the NPL Cup.

- Chorley bt. Goole Town
