= 1988–89 Northern Premier League =

The 1988–89 Northern Premier League season was the 21st in the history of the Northern Premier League, a football competition in England. Teams were divided into two divisions; the Premier and the First. It was known as the HFS Loans League for sponsorship reasons.

== Premier Division ==
Northern Premier League Premier Division
- Season: 1988–89
- Champions: Barrow
- Promoted: Barrow
- Relegated: Worksop Town
- Matches: 462
- Goals: 1,319 (2.85 per match)

The Premier Division featured three new teams:

- Shepshed Charterhouse transferred from Southern League Premier Division
- Fleetwood Town promoted as champions from Division One
- Stalybridge Celtic promoted as runners up from Division One

=== League table ===
Pos	Team	Pld	W	D	L	GF	GA	GD	Pts	Qualification or relegation
1	Barrow (C, P)	42	26	9	7	69	35	+34	87	Promoted to Football Conference
2	Hyde United	42	24	8	10	77	44	+33	80	
3	Witton Albion	42	22	13	7	67	39	+28	79	
4	Bangor City	42	22	10	10	77	48	+29	76	
5	Marine	42	23	7	12	69	48	+21	76	
6	Goole Town	42	22	7	13	75	60	+15	73	
7	Fleetwood Town	42	19	16	7	58	44	+14	73	
8	Rhyl	42	18	10	14	75	65	+10	64	
9	Frickley Athletic	42	17	10	15	64	53	+11	61	
10	Mossley	42	17	9	16	56	58	−2	60	
11	South Liverpool	42	15	13	14	65	57	+8	58	
12	Caernarfon Town	42	15	10	17	49	63	−14	55	
13	Matlock Town	42	16	5	21	65	73	−8	53	
14	Southport	42	13	12	17	66	52	+14	51	
15	Buxton	42	12	14	16	61	63	−2	50	
16	Morecambe	42	13	9	20	55	60	−5	47 (Note: Morecambe had 1 point deducted.)	
17	Gainsborough Trinity	42	12	11	19	56	73	−17	47	
18	Shepshed Charterhouse	42	14	8	20	49	60	−11	44 (Note: Shepshed Charterhouse had 6 points deducted.)	
19	Stalybridge Celtic	42	9	13	20	46	81	−35	40	
20	Horwich RMI	42	7	14	21	42	70	−28	35	
21	Gateshead	42	7	13	22	36	70	−34	34	
22	Worksop Town (R)	42	6	5	31	42	103	−61	23	Relegated to Division One

(C) Champions; (P) Promoted; (R) Relegated

=== Results ===
Home \ Away	BAN	BRW	BUX	CNR	FLE	FRK	GAI	GAT	GOO	HOR	HYD	MAR	MAT	MOR	MOS	RHL	CHR	SLI	SOU	STL	WTN	WKS
Bangor City		1–2	0–1	1–1	0–0	1–0	1–1	3–0	2–3	3–2	1–2	3–2	2–0	3–0	3–2	3–1	1–0	2–2	3–0	3–1	2–3	2–1
Barrow	1–0		1–0	1–0	2–3	2–0	3–0	2–0	3–2	2–1	1–1	0–2	1–0	3–1	2–2	2–0	1–2	0–2	3–1	4–0	3–0	1–0
Buxton	1–1	5–2		1–1	1–0	1–1	1–2	1–1	1–0	0–0	1–2	1–1	4–0	0–3	0–1	0–2	3–3	1–3	3–3	4–1	2–2	4–1
Caernarfon Town	0–1	0–1	3–1		2–2	0–3	0–1	1–1	0–1	2–2	1–0	2–1	2–0	1–0	0–2	0–1	1–0	2–1	1–1	2–0	0–0	1–1
Fleetwood Town	2–0	2–0	2–1	1–0		1–0	1–1	1–1	1–0	2–0	0–2	2–3	4–2	1–0	2–1	1–1	1–1	1–1	1–0	0–0	0–1	2–1
Frickley Athletic	0–4	2–1	1–2	2–3	1–1		3–0	4–1	2–1	3–3	2–0	2–1	2–0	1–0	5–0	0–3	3–1	2–0	0–0	2–2	0–1	1–1
Gainsborough Trinity	2–2	1–2	1–3	1–2	1–1	1–2		1–0	1–2	1–1	2–2	1–2	2–1	1–0	3–0	6–1	2–0	0–4	2–1	0–3	3–3	1–3
Gateshead	0–0	1–2	2–1	0–2	0–1	1–1	2–1		1–3	1–0	2–0	1–1	0–1	1–0	1–2	1–1	0–2	0–0	1–2	1–2	0–1	2–1
Goole Town	3–1	0–2	1–1	6–2	4–3	2–1	2–3	4–2		3–1	4–0	0–1	2–1	2–3	1–3	3–2	1–0	2–1	2–2	2–1	3–0	2–1
Horwich RMI	0–3	0–3	0–1	3–0	1–1	1–4	0–4	1–1	1–1		0–2	0–1	1–1	1–2	0–1	2–1	0–1	2–0	2–5	1–0	2–2	1–1
Hyde United	2–1	0–2	3–2	4–0	1–1	1–0	2–0	5–0	3–0	0–0		4–1	3–1	0–1	2–2	4–2	3–0	1–2	2–0	4–0	2–2	3–0
Marine	1–2	0–0	3–1	1–1	4–1	0–1	2–0	1–0	0–2	2–2	3–1		3–1	2–0	3–1	3–1	5–2	0–2	1–1	2–2	2–0	1–0
Matlock Town	4–2	0–2	5–4	2–3	2–3	2–1	2–2	3–1	3–1	0–0	2–1	2–4		3–2	2–0	2–1	1–2	1–0	2–2	3–0	0–0	6–1
Morecambe	1–2	1–1	1–1	3–1	0–2	2–1	5–2	2–0	0–0	1–0	2–2	3–1	1–2		3–3	2–0	2–0	2–2	0–1	1–2	0–1	3–1
Mossley	1–2	1–1	1–0	1–1	1–1	2–1	2–0	1–1	2–0	1–0	0–1	0–1	2–1	2–0		1–1	2–1	0–1	0–2	1–2	1–1	2–1
Rhyl	2–2	1–1	0–1	1–0	1–1	3–3	1–1	1–1	0–1	6–1	1–2	0–2	2–0	2–1	4–0		6–1	4–3	1–0	4–3	1–5	2–1
Shepshed Charterhouse	1–1	1–1	1–1	0–1	1–2	2–0	2–0	3–1	0–2	1–2	0–3	2–0	2–0	2–1	2–1	1–1		3–0	0–1	3–0	0–1	0–1
South Liverpool	1–3	1–2	1–1	5–1	0–2	0–0	4–1	1–1	0–0	4–2	1–2	1–0	1–0	3–1	0–2	1–3	4–1		2–1	4–4	1–1	1–1
Southport	0–2	1–1	1–0	5–0	3–1	1–3	0–0	7–0	1–1	0–2	0–2	0–1	4–0	1–1	4–1	1–2	0–0	2–2		0–1	0–1	5–1
Stalybridge Celtic	2–2	0–4	2–3	0–2	1–1	1–2	1–1	2–2	1–1	1–1	0–1	1–2	1–0	1–1	0–3	0–1	0–3	1–2	2–2		1–0	2–1
Witton Albion	0–1	0–0	1–1	3–0	1–1	1–1	4–0	2–0	3–0	2–1	2–2	1–0	1–3	3–1	1–0	2–3	2–0	1–0	1–0	6–1		3–1
Worksop Town	0–5	0–1	3–0	2–7	1–2	3–1	0–3	0–4	4–5	0–2	2–0	1–3	1–4	2–1	1–5	0–4	1–2	1–1	0–5	0–1	0–2	

Updated to match(es) played on 6 May 1989. Source: Northern Premier Division results grid
Legend: Blue = home team win; Yellow = draw; Red = away team win.

== Division One ==
Northern Premier League Division One
- Season: 1988–89
- Champions: Colne Dynamoes
- Promoted: Colne Dynamoes; Bishop Auckland
- Relegated: Sutton Town
- Matches: 462
- Goals: 1,408 (3.05 per match)

The Division One featured five new teams:

- Workington relegated from Premier Division
- Colne Dynamoes promoted as champions of the NWCFL Division One
- Bishop Auckland promoted from Northern League Division One
- Whitley Bay promoted from Northern League Division One
- Newtown promoted from Mid Wales League

=== League table ===
Pos	Team	Pld	W	D	L	GF	GA	GD	Pts	Qualification or relegation
1	Colne Dynamoes (C, P)	42	30	11	1	102	21	+81	98 (Note: Colne Dynamoes were docked 3 points.)	Promoted to Premier Division
2	Bishop Auckland (P)	42	28	5	9	78	28	+50	89	Promoted to Premier Division
3	Leek Town	42	25	11	6	74	41	+33	85 (Note: Leek Town and Netherfield were docked 1 point.)	
4	Droylsden	42	25	9	8	84	48	+36	84	
5	Whitley Bay	42	23	6	13	77	49	+28	75	
6	Accrington Stanley	42	21	10	11	81	60	+21	73	
7	Lancaster City	42	21	8	13	76	54	+22	71	
8	Harrogate Town	42	19	7	16	68	61	+7	64	
9	Newtown	42	15	12	15	65	59	+6	57	
10	Congleton Town	42	15	11	16	62	66	−4	56	
11	Workington	42	17	3	22	59	74	−15	54	
12	Eastwood Town	42	14	10	18	55	61	−6	52	
13	Curzon Ashton	42	13	11	18	74	72	+2	50	
14	Farsley Celtic	42	12	13	17	52	73	−21	49	
15	Irlam Town	42	11	14	17	53	63	−10	47	
16	Penrith	42	14	5	23	61	91	−30	47	
17	Radcliffe Borough	42	12	10	20	62	86	−24	46	
18	Eastwood Hanley	42	11	12	19	46	67	−21	45	
19	Winsford United	42	13	6	23	58	93	−35	45	
20	Alfreton Town	42	8	11	23	44	92	−48	35	
21	Netherfield	42	8	9	25	57	90	−33	32	
22	Sutton Town (R)	42	7	6	29	70	109	−39	27	Relegated to NCEL Premier Division:

(C) Champions; (P) Promoted; (R) Relegated

== Promotion and relegation ==
In the twenty-first season of the Northern Premier League Barrow (as champions) were automatically promoted to the Football Conference. Meanwhile, Worksop Town were relegated; these two sides were replaced by First Division winners Colne Dynamoes and second placed Bishop Auckland. Sutton Town left the First Division at the end of the season and were replaced by newly admitted Emley and Rossendale United.

== Cup Results ==
Challenge Cup:

- Mossley 2–1 Fleetwood Town

President's Cup:

- Bangor City 5–1 South Liverpool

Northern Premier League Shield: Between Champions of NPL Premier Division and Winners of the NPL Cup.

- Mossley bt. Barrow
