= 1989–90 FA Cup qualifying rounds =

Tournament details
- Country: England; Wales

The 1989–90 FA Cup qualifying rounds opened the 109th season of competition in England for 'The Football Association Challenge Cup' (FA Cup), the world's oldest association football single knockout competition. A total of 540 clubs were accepted for the competition, up 15 from the previous season's 525.

The large number of clubs entering the tournament from lower down (Levels 5 through 8) in the English football pyramid meant that the competition started with five rounds of preliminary (1) and qualifying (4) knockouts for these non-League teams. The 28 winning teams from fourth round qualifying progressed to the First round proper, where League teams tiered at Levels 3 and 4 entered the competition.

== Calendar ==
Round	Start date	New Entries	Clubs
Preliminary round	Saturday 2 September 1989	272	540 → 404
First round qualifying	Saturday 16 September 1989	152	404 → 260
Second round qualifying	Saturday 30 September 1989	none	260 → 188
Third round qualifying	Saturday 14 October 1989	none	188 → 152
Fourth round qualifying	Saturday 28 October 1989	20	152 → 124
First round proper	Friday 17 November 1989	52	124 → 84
Second round proper	Saturday 9 December 1989	none	84 → 64
Third round proper	Saturday 6 January 1990	44	64 → 32
Fourth round proper	Saturday 27 January 1990	none	32 → 16
Fifth round proper	Saturday 17 February 1990	none	16 → 8
Sixth round proper	Saturday 10 March 1990	none	8 → 4
Semi-finals	Sunday 8 April 1990	none	4 → 2
Final	Saturday 12 May 1990	none	2 → 1

== Preliminary round ==
=== Ties ===
Tie	Home team	Score	Away team
1	Abingdon United	1-4	Newport I O W
2	Alnwick Town	1-1	Peterlee Newtown
3	Andover	2-2	Camberley Town
4	Annfield Plain	2-3	Shotton Comrades
5	Atherton Laburnum Rovers	1-1	Accrington Stanley
6	Aveley	0-0	Chesham United
7	Baldock Town	3-0	Cray Wanderers
8	Barkingside	2-5	Harlow Town
9	Barton Rovers	0-0	Chipstead
10	Basildon United	0-1	Stowmarket Town
11	Beckenham Town	0-5	Walthamstow Pennant
12	Belper Town	1-0	Ashton United
13	Billericay Town	0-1	Dunstable
14	Bilston Town	1-1	Desborough Town
15	Boreham Wood	1-0	Harefield United
16	Bournemouth	2-0	Bracknell Town
17	Brackley Town	Walkover	Coventry Sporting
18	Braintree Town	1-1	Newmarket Town
19	Bridlington Trinity	Walkover	Darlington Cleveland Bridge
20	Brigg Town	0-2	St Helens Town
21	Burgess Hill Town	1-2	Wandsworth & Norwood
22	Burscough	2-0	Bootle
23	Bury Town	0-5	Clapton
24	Chadderton	1-2	Gresley Rovers
25	Chard Town	2-1	Yate Town
26	Chasetown	2-2	Spalding United
27	Chertsey Town	3-1	Arundel
28	Cleator Moor Celtic	1-1	Thackley
29	Clevedon Town	0-1	Ilfracombe Town
30	Clitheroe	4-0	Bedlington Terriers
31	Collier Row	3-1	Corinthian
32	Colwyn Bay	5-1	Ilkeston Town
33	Congleton Town	1-1	Irlam Town
34	Consett	1-3	Ferryhill Athletic
35	Crook Town	0-0	Workington
36	Croydon	3-2	Havant Town
37	Cwmbran Town	1-0	Bridgend Town
38	Darenth Heathside	3-3	Hertford Town
39	Darwen	0-3	Lancaster City
40	Droylsden	3-2	Blackpool Wren Rovers
41	Eastwood Town	1-2	Grantham Town
42	Edgware Town	1-3	Burnham
43	Egham Town	4-1	Sheppey United
44	Epsom & Ewell	0-0	Metropolitan Police
45	Erith & Belvedere	5-1	Chatham Town
46	Esh Winning	2-6	North Shields
47	Evenwood Town	0-1	Durham City
48	Evesham United	0-1	Malvern Town
49	Felixstowe Town	0-2	Tring Town
50	Flackwell Heath	3-0	Horndean
51	Friar Lane Old Boys	1-2	Farsley Celtic
52	Glastonbury	0-1	Maesteg Park
53	Glossop	0-4	Maine Road
54	Great Yarmouth Town	0-2	Stevenage Borough
55	Hailsham Town	2-2	Eton Manor
56	Halesowen Harriers	2-5	Rushden Town
57	Harworth Colliery Institute	0-3	Ashington
58	Haywards Heath Town	1-2	A F C Totton
59	Heanor Town	2-0	Formby
60	Hednesford Town	0-2	Lye Town
61	Herne Bay	3-1	Horsham
62	Heybridge Swifts	1-1	Ford United
63	Hinckley Athletic	2-0	Highgate United
64	Hitchin Town	3-1	Leicester United
65	Hoddesdon Town	2-3	Berkhamsted Town
66	Horden Colliery Welfare	0-3	Whitley Bay
67	Hounslow	2-2	Horsham Y M C A
68	Lancing	0-1	Canterbury City
69	Langford	0-3	Canvey Island
70	Langley Park Welfare	5-4	Guiseley
71	Letchworth Garden City	1-3	Royston Town
72	Lewes	2-1	Hanwell Town
73	Leyland Motors	0-1	Rossendale United
74	Littlehampton Town	1-1	Calne Town
75	Lowestoft Town	2-1	Gorleston
76	March Town United	5-0	Chatteris Town
77	Margate	2-1	Wick
78	Merstham	1-2	Hornchurch
79	Mile Oak Rovers	1-2	Warrington Town
80	Milton Keynes Wolverton Town	2-1	Irthlingborough Diamonds
81	Newbury Town	2-2	Bristol Manor Farm
82	North Ferriby United	1-0	Long Eaton United
83	Northallerton Town	3-3	Netherfield
84	Northampton Spencer	3-3	Paget Rangers
85	Northwood	1-3	Hampton
86	Norton & Stockton Ancients	1-7	South Bank
87	Nuneaton Borough	1-1	Willenhall Town
88	Oakham United	4-2	Worksop Town
89	Oldbury United	1-1	King's Lynn
90	Paulton Rovers	4-2	Radstock Town
91	Peacehaven & Telscombe	0-0	Corinthian Casuals
92	Penrith	2-3	Murton
93	Petersfield United	0-4	Poole Town
94	Prescot Cables	2-1	Ossett Albion
95	Princes End United	0-2	Alfreton Town
96	Prudhoe East End	1-0	Harrogate Town
97	Purfleet	1-1	Stamford
98	Racing Club Warwick	1-1	Haverhill Rovers
99	Radcliffe Borough	2-2	Bridgnorth Town
100	Rayners Lane	1-0	Wembley
101	Ringmer	0-1	Molesey
102	Romsey Town	5-1	Westbury United
103	Ruislip Manor	0-0	Portfield
104	Saffron Walden Town	2-1	Burnham Ramblers
105	Salisbury	6-0	Sholing Sports
106	Seaham Red Star	1-0	Easington Colliery
107	Sharpness	1-1	Chippenham Town
108	Sheffield	1-0	Armthorpe Welfare
109	Skelmersdale United	1-1	Curzon Ashton
110	Soham Town Rangers	0-1	Rothwell Town
111	Southwick	3-0	Rainham Town
112	Steyning Town	2-5	Eastbourne United
113	Stratford Town	0-0	Wellingborough Town
114	Sutton Coldfield Town	7-0	Harrisons
115	Sutton Town	1-1	Rushall Olympic
116	Taunton Town	9-1	Minehead
117	Thame United	7-0	Frome Town
118	Three Bridges	1-0	Banstead Athletic
119	Tiverton Town	1-1	Trowbridge Town
120	Tividale	1-3	Stourbridge
121	Ton Pentre	2-2	Mangotsfield United
122	Tooting & Mitcham United	2-2	Worthing
123	Torrington	1-1	Falmouth Town
124	Tunbridge Wells	1-1	Deal Town
125	Walsall Wood	2-0	Winsford United
126	Ware	2-1	Tiptree United
127	Washington	0-0	Chester-Le-Street Town
128	Welton Rovers	0-5	Thatcham Town
129	Welwyn Garden City	1-1	Halstead Town
130	Wimborne Town	0-2	Swanage Town & Herston
131	Wisbech Town	5-0	Eynesbury Rovers
132	Witham Town	2-1	Clacton Town
133	Witney Town	4-1	Chichester City
134	Wivenhoe Town	2-0	Harwich & Parkeston
135	Wootton Blue Cross	0-2	Cheshunt
136	Yeading	4-0	Buckingham Town

=== Replays ===
Tie	Home team	Score	Away team
2	Peterlee Newtown	1-2	Alnwick Town
3	Camberley Town	1-5	Andover
5	Accrington Stanley	5-2	Atherton Laburnum Rovers
6	Chesham United	0-1	Aveley
9	Chipstead	2-3	Barton Rovers
14	Desborough Town	2-1	Bilston Town
18	Newmarket Town	1-0	Braintree Town
26	Spalding United	3-0	Chasetown
28	Thackley	1-3	Cleator Moor Celtic
33	Irlam Town	0-2	Congleton Town
35	Workington	0-1	Crook Town
38	Hertford Town	4-1	Darenth Heathside
44	Metropolitan Police	0-2	Epsom & Ewell
55	Eton Manor	0-1	Hailsham Town
62	Ford United	0-2	Heybridge Swifts
67	Horsham Y M C A	0-1	Hounslow
74	Calne Town	0-1	Littlehampton Town
81	Bristol Manor Farm	3-1	Newbury Town
83	Netherfield	2-1	Northallerton Town
84	Paget Rangers	2-0	Northampton Spencer
87	Willenhall Town	1-0	Nuneaton Borough
89	King's Lynn	3-1	Oldbury United
91	Corinthian Casuals	1-2	Peacehaven & Telscombe
97	Stamford	1-2	Purfleet
98	Haverhill Rovers	1-0	Racing Club Warwick
99	Bridgnorth Town	0-2	Radcliffe Borough
103	Portfield	0-2	Ruislip Manor
107	Chippenham Town	1-0	Sharpness
109	Curzon Ashton	2-0	Skelmersdale United
113	Wellingborough Town	3-4	Stratford Town
115	Rushall Olympic	3-0	Sutton Town
119	Trowbridge Town	3-1	Tiverton Town
121	Mangotsfield United	1-1	Ton Pentre
122	Worthing	0-1	Tooting & Mitcham United
123	Falmouth Town	4-2	Torrington
124	Deal Town	2-1	Tunbridge Wells
127	Chester-Le-Street Town	2-1	Washington
129	Halstead Town	4-2	Welwyn Garden City

=== 2nd replays ===
Tie	Home team	Score	Away team
121	Ton Pentre	3-3	Mangotsfield United

=== 3rd replay ===
Tie	Home team	Score	Away team
121	Mangotsfield United	3-1	Ton Pentre

== 1st qualifying round ==
=== Ties ===
Tie	Home team	Score	Away team
1	A F C Totton	4-2	Whitehawk
2	Accrington Stanley	4-0	Borrowash Victoria
3	Alfreton Town	1-0	Rocester
4	Alvechurch	0-1	Bedworth United
5	Andover	2-0	Devizes Town
6	Ashington	0-5	Alnwick Town
7	Aveley	0-1	Boreham Wood
8	Baldock Town	0-2	Wycombe Wanderers
9	Banbury United	1-3	Maidenhead United
10	Bangor City	3-1	Heanor Town
11	Barking	1-1	Hendon
12	Barton Rovers	2-0	Windsor & Eton
13	Basingstoke Town	1-1	Bashley
14	Belper Town	2-2	Arnold Town
15	Berkhamsted Town	1-0	East Thurrock United
16	Billingham Synthonia	2-0	Guisborough Town
17	Billingham Town	1-1	Spennymoor United
18	Bishop Auckland	3-2	Chester-Le-Street Town
19	Bishop's Stortford	0-1	Barnet
20	Boldmere St Michaels	2-3	Tamworth
21	Boston United	3-3	Leek Town
22	Brackley Town	2-1	Shepshed Charterhouse
23	Bristol Manor Farm	0-1	Cwmbran Town
24	Bromley	1-1	Kingsbury Town
25	Burscough	1-2	Maine Road
26	Buxton	3-1	Emley
27	Caernarfon Town	3-1	Horwich R M I
28	Canterbury City	2-0	Tooting & Mitcham United
29	Canvey Island	3-0	Purfleet
30	Chard Town	0-2	Dorchester Town
31	Cheltenham Town	1-0	Saltash United
32	Chertsey Town	4-0	Eastleigh
33	Chippenham Town	1-2	Weston Super Mare
34	Clapton	1-2	Sudbury Town
35	Cleator Moor Celtic	1-4	Barrow
36	Clitheroe	2-2	Ferryhill Athletic
37	Collier Row	1-2	Dulwich Hamlet
38	Colwyn Bay	4-1	Morecambe
39	Congleton Town	2-1	Denaby United
40	Crawley Town	0-1	Staines Town
41	Crook Town	5-1	West Auckland Town
42	Croydon	0-3	Wokingham Town
43	Curzon Ashton	2-0	Prescot Cables
44	Darlington Cleveland Bridge	0-1	Gateshead
45	Deal Town	1-3	Whitstable Town
46	Desborough Town	1-0	Atherstone United
47	Dorking	1-2	Tilbury
48	Droylsden	0-0	Fleetwood Town
49	Dudley Town	0-1	Boston
50	Dunstable	3-0	Vauxhall Motors
51	Eastbourne United	1-2	Malden Vale
52	Egham Town	0-1	Margate
53	Exmouth Town	2-0	Ilfracombe Town
54	Falmouth Town	1-1	St Blazey
55	Flackwell Heath	0-2	Newport I O W
56	Folkestone	2-1	Leatherhead
57	Gainsborough Trinity	1-2	Sutton Coldfield Town
58	Gloucester City	4-0	Mangotsfield United
59	Goole Town	1-0	Farsley Celtic
60	Gosport Borough	2-0	Hungerford Town
61	Grantham Town	2-1	Louth United
62	Gresley Rovers	2-2	Witton Albion
63	Gretna	3-5	Tow Law Town
64	Hailsham Town	2-0	Tonbridge
65	Halstead Town	3-2	Harlow Town
66	Hampton	3-1	Fisher Athletic
67	Harrow Borough	1-2	Gravesend & Northfleet
68	Hastings Town	0-3	Walton & Hersham
69	Haverhill Rovers	1-1	Corby Town
70	Herne Bay	0-6	Dover Athletic
71	Hertford Town	0-1	Burnham
72	Heybridge Swifts	2-1	Grays Athletic
73	Hinckley Athletic	1-3	Frickley Athletic
74	Hitchin Town	3-2	Wisbech Town
75	Hornchurch	1-2	Erith & Belvedere
76	King's Lynn	0-3	Bromsgrove Rovers
77	Kingstonian	1-5	Woking
78	Lancaster City	0-1	Durham City
79	Langley Park Welfare	3-1	Brandon United
80	Lewes	2-0	Epsom & Ewell
81	Littlehampton Town	3-1	Waterlooville
82	Lowestoft Town	1-1	Arlesey Town
83	Lye Town	2-0	Stourbridge
84	Maesteg Park	1-2	Trowbridge Town
85	Malvern Town	1-5	Barry Town
86	Marine	1-1	Eastwood Hanley
87	Milton Keynes Wolverton Town	2-1	Baker Perkins
88	Moor Green	0-1	Redditch United
89	Mossley	0-0	South Liverpool
90	Murton	0-3	Blyth Spartans
91	Netherfield	3-1	Ryhope Community Association
92	Newcastle Blue Star	1-1	Stockton
93	Newmarket Town	1-0	Leighton Town
94	North Shields	1-0	Whickham
95	Paget Rangers	2-1	Ely City
96	Pagham	0-1	Marlow
97	Paulton Rovers	2-3	Shortwood United
98	Peacehaven & Telscombe	0-1	Molesey
99	Prudhoe East End	0-0	Seaham Red Star
100	Radcliffe Borough	1-2	Rhyl
101	Rayners Lane	1-2	Hounslow
102	Redbridge Forest	2-4	Dartford
103	Redhill	1-0	Ramsgate
104	Romsey Town	1-1	Fareham Town
105	Rossendale United	2-1	Vauxhall G M
106	Rothwell Town	0-2	March Town United
107	Royston Town	2-1	Feltham
108	Ruislip Manor	1-3	Ashford Town (Kent)
109	Rushall Olympic	0-1	Matlock Town
110	Rushden Town	4-5	Holbeach United
111	Salisbury	1-1	Poole Town
112	Sheffield	0-1	Hyde United
113	Shotton Comrades	0-5	Bridlington Town
114	Slough Town	5-1	Walthamstow Pennant
115	South Bank	2-0	Shildon
116	Southport	3-2	Stalybridge Celtic
117	Southwick	5-0	Shoreham
118	St Albans City	1-2	Wealdstone
119	St Helens Town	0-1	Sandwell Borough
120	Stafford Rangers	1-0	Hinckley Town
121	Stevenage Borough	3-5	Cambridge City
122	Stowmarket Town	5-3	Saffron Walden Town
123	Stratford Town	2-0	Histon
124	Swanage Town & Herston	4-0	Melksham Town
125	Taunton Town	3-0	Bideford
126	Thame United	0-3	Abingdon Town
127	Thatcham Town	2-2	Stroud
128	Three Bridges	0-2	Hythe Town
129	Tring Town	0-4	Leyton Wingate
130	Uxbridge	1-0	Hemel Hempstead
131	Walsall Wood	0-1	Oakham United
132	Wandsworth & Norwood	1-1	Carshalton Athletic
133	Ware	2-0	Cheshunt
134	Warrington Town	1-0	North Ferriby United
135	Weymouth	6-2	Barnstaple Town
136	Whitby Town	1-3	Hebburn
137	Whitley Bay	6-0	Willington
138	Whyteleafe	1-0	Sittingbourne
139	Willenhall Town	1-1	Spalding United
140	Witham Town	3-1	Finchley
141	Witney Town	1-0	Bournemouth
142	Wivenhoe Town	3-0	Potton United
143	Worcester City	3-0	Clandown
144	Yeading	0-0	Chalfont St Peter

=== Replays ===
Tie	Home team	Score	Away team
11	Hendon	2-2	Barking
13	Bashley	2-3	Basingstoke Town
14	Arnold Town	3-1	Belper Town
17	Spennymoor United	2-1	Billingham Town
21	Leek Town	0-3	Boston United
24	Kingsbury Town	2-2	Bromley
36	Ferryhill Athletic	1-1	Clitheroe
48	Fleetwood Town	1-1	Droylsden
54	St Blazey	1-0	Falmouth Town
62	Witton Albion	1-0	Gresley Rovers
69	Corby Town	2-3	Haverhill Rovers
82	Arlesey Town	0-4	Lowestoft Town
86	Eastwood Hanley	1-2	Marine
89	South Liverpool	0-3	Mossley
92	Stockton	1-3	Newcastle Blue Star
99	Seaham Red Star	3-2	Prudhoe East End
104	Fareham Town	1-2	Romsey Town
111	Poole Town	3-1	Salisbury
127	Stroud	2-1	Thatcham Town
132	Carshalton Athletic	3-1	Wandsworth & Norwood
139	Spalding United	0-2	Willenhall Town
144	Chalfont St Peter	0-5	Yeading

=== 2nd replays ===
Tie	Home team	Score	Away team
11	Barking	1-2	Hendon
24	Kingsbury Town	0-2	Bromley
36	Clitheroe	3-4	Ferryhill Athletic
48	Fleetwood Town	0-1	Droylsden

== 2nd qualifying round ==
=== Ties ===
Tie	Home team	Score	Away team
1	A F C Totton	1-3	Newport I O W
2	Abingdon Town	0-0	Cwmbran Town
3	Ashford Town (Kent)	0-1	Erith & Belvedere
4	Barnet	4-2	Newmarket Town
5	Barrow	3-1	Alnwick Town
6	Barry Town	2-2	Gloucester City
7	Barton Rovers	1-1	Burnham
8	Basingstoke Town	3-1	Chertsey Town
9	Bedworth United	3-0	Stratford Town
10	Billingham Synthonia	0-0	Netherfield
11	Blyth Spartans	4-1	Durham City
12	Boston	1-2	Grantham Town
13	Boston United	1-0	Alfreton Town
14	Brackley Town	1-2	Sutton Coldfield Town
15	Bridlington Town	2-1	Seaham Red Star
16	Bromley	3-0	Royston Town
17	Bromsgrove Rovers	4-0	March Town United
18	Buxton	1-1	Sandwell Borough
19	Caernarfon Town	1-2	Congleton Town
20	Cambridge City	3-0	Canvey Island
21	Carshalton Athletic	0-2	Slough Town
22	Cheltenham Town	7-0	Weston Super Mare
23	Colwyn Bay	2-1	Maine Road
24	Dartford	3-1	Witham Town
25	Desborough Town	1-1	Lye Town
26	Dorchester Town	0-0	Trowbridge Town
27	Dover Athletic	0-0	Canterbury City
28	Droylsden	0-1	Curzon Ashton
29	Dulwich Hamlet	4-1	Lewes
30	Folkestone	1-1	Redhill
31	Frickley Athletic	1-1	Goole Town
32	Gateshead	3-0	Ferryhill Athletic
33	Gosport Borough	1-1	Swanage Town & Herston
34	Gravesend & Northfleet	1-0	Berkhamsted Town
35	Hampton	2-0	Hounslow
36	Haverhill Rovers	2-3	Hitchin Town
37	Hebburn	0-0	South Bank
38	Hendon	7-0	Lowestoft Town
39	Heybridge Swifts	1-0	Halstead Town
40	Hyde United	2-1	Bangor City
41	Hythe Town	2-1	Molesey
42	Langley Park Welfare	2-5	Bishop Auckland
43	Leyton Wingate	2-1	Ware
44	Littlehampton Town	0-4	Witney Town
45	Maidenhead United	2-0	Stroud
46	Marine	2-0	Rossendale United
47	Marlow	3-2	Andover
48	Matlock Town	5-0	Willenhall Town
49	Mossley	3-1	Accrington Stanley
50	Newcastle Blue Star	1-1	North Shields
51	Redditch United	5-0	Paget Rangers
52	Rhyl	2-0	Oakham United
53	Romsey Town	1-2	Poole Town
54	Southport	2-1	Arnold Town
55	Spennymoor United	2-4	Whitley Bay
56	Stafford Rangers	2-0	Milton Keynes Wolverton Town
57	Staines Town	1-0	Dunstable (Abandoned 38 minutes, result stands)
58	Sudbury Town	3-2	Stowmarket Town
59	Tamworth	1-0	Holbeach United
60	Taunton Town	0-0	Exmouth Town
61	Tilbury	2-2	Hailsham Town
62	Tow Law Town	4-2	Crook Town
63	Uxbridge	1-0	Yeading
64	Walton & Hersham	0-1	Whitstable Town
65	Wealdstone	0-1	Wivenhoe Town
66	Weymouth	2-0	St Blazey
67	Whyteleafe	2-0	Malden Vale
68	Witton Albion	2-0	Warrington Town
69	Woking	4-1	Southwick
70	Wokingham Town	1-0	Margate
71	Worcester City	3-0	Shortwood United
72	Wycombe Wanderers	3-1	Boreham Wood

=== Replays ===
Tie	Home team	Score	Away team
2	Cwmbran Town	3-4	Abingdon Town
6	Gloucester City	2-0	Barry Town
7	Burnham	3-2	Barton Rovers
10	Netherfield	1-2	Billingham Synthonia
18	Sandwell Borough	1-1	Buxton
25	Lye Town	5-2	Desborough Town
26	Trowbridge Town	0-2	Dorchester Town
27	Canterbury City	0-2	Dover Athletic
30	Redhill	0-1	Folkestone
31	Goole Town	1-0	Frickley Athletic
33	Swanage Town & Herston	0-2	Gosport Borough
37	South Bank	3-0	Hebburn
50	North Shields	4-2	Newcastle Blue Star
60	Exmouth Town	2-2	Taunton Town
61	Hailsham Town	2-1	Tilbury (Abandoned in extra time)

=== 2nd replays ===
Tie	Home team	Score	Away team
18	Buxton	3-2	Sandwell Borough
60	Taunton Town	0-0	Exmouth Town
61	Tilbury	2-3	Hailsham Town

=== 3rd replay ===
Tie	Home team	Score	Away team
60	Exmouth Town	2-1	Taunton Town

== 3rd qualifying round ==
=== Ties ===
Tie	Home team	Score	Away team
1	Abingdon Town	3-1	Maidenhead United
2	Barrow	2-2	Whitley Bay
3	Bishop Auckland	1-1	South Bank
4	Blyth Spartans	0-3	North Shields
5	Bridlington Town	0-0	Tow Law Town
6	Bromsgrove Rovers	2-0	Tamworth
7	Burnham	0-1	Staines Town
8	Cambridge City	3-4	Barnet
9	Colwyn Bay	1-1	Congleton Town
10	Curzon Ashton	1-1	Mossley
11	Dorchester Town	2-1	Cheltenham Town
12	Dover Athletic	0-1	Folkestone
13	Dulwich Hamlet	1-1	Hailsham Town
14	Erith & Belvedere	1-1	Woking
15	Exmouth Town	2-0	Weymouth
16	Gateshead	0-2	Billingham Synthonia
17	Gloucester City	4-2	Worcester City
18	Goole Town	2-1	Grantham Town
19	Hampton	0-1	Bromley
20	Heybridge Swifts	0-1	Dartford
21	Hitchin Town	0-2	Redditch United
22	Hyde United	0-1	Marine
23	Hythe Town	2-0	Whitstable Town
24	Leyton Wingate	0-0	Wivenhoe Town
25	Lye Town	1-2	Stafford Rangers
26	Matlock Town	1-1	Boston United
27	Newport I O W	0-1	Marlow
28	Poole Town	1-0	Gosport Borough
29	Rhyl	0-3	Southport
30	Slough Town	0-0	Uxbridge
31	Sudbury Town	1-2	Hendon
32	Sutton Coldfield Town	1-2	Bedworth United
33	Witney Town	0-2	Basingstoke Town
34	Witton Albion	1-1	Buxton
35	Wokingham Town	1-1	Whyteleafe
36	Wycombe Wanderers	1-1	Gravesend & Northfleet

=== Replays ===
Tie	Home team	Score	Away team
2	Whitley Bay	3-1	Barrow
3	South Bank	1-3	Bishop Auckland
5	Tow Law Town	0-0	Bridlington Town
9	Congleton Town	4-0	Colwyn Bay
10	Mossley	3-1	Curzon Ashton
13	Hailsham Town	3-4	Dulwich Hamlet
14	Woking	5-0	Erith & Belvedere
24	Wivenhoe Town	2-0	Leyton Wingate
26	Boston United	0-1	Matlock Town
30	Uxbridge	1-2	Slough Town
34	Buxton	4-6	Witton Albion
35	Whyteleafe	1-2	Wokingham Town
36	Gravesend & Northfleet	1-1	Wycombe Wanderers

=== 2nd replays ===
Tie	Home team	Score	Away team
5	Tow Law Town	3-2	Bridlington Town
36	Gravesend & Northfleet	0-3	Wycombe Wanderers

== 4th qualifying round ==
The teams that given byes to this round are Darlington, Kidderminster Harriers, Runcorn, Yeovil Town, Northwich Victoria, Welling United, Enfield, Altrincham, Chorley, Merthyr Tydfil, Farnborough Town, Aylesbury United, Dagenham, Bognor Regis Town, Chelmsford City, Rugby Town, Burton Albion, Halesowen Town, Bath City and Hayes.

=== Ties ===
Tie	Home team	Score	Away team
1	Abingdon Town	0-3	Slough Town
2	Aylesbury United	4-1	Hendon
3	Basingstoke Town	1-1	Marlow
4	Billingham Synthonia	2-1	North Shields
5	Bognor Regis Town	1-1	Dorchester Town
6	Bromsgrove Rovers	1-0	V S Rugby
7	Burton Albion	2-2	Barnet
8	Chorley	1-1	Marine
9	Congleton Town	1-0	Witton Albion
10	Darlington	4-2	Runcorn
11	Dartford	3-1	Dagenham
12	Dulwich Hamlet	1-1	Merthyr Tydfil
13	Exmouth Town	1-4	Farnborough Town
14	Folkestone	0-1	Gloucester City
15	Hythe Town	0-0	Hayes
16	Kidderminster Harriers	2-2	Chelmsford City
17	Matlock Town	3-1	Enfield
18	Mossley	1-1	Bishop Auckland
19	Northwich Victoria	2-0	Goole Town
20	Poole Town	2-2	Bath City
21	Redditch United	1-1	Bedworth United
22	Southport	1-3	Whitley Bay
23	Stafford Rangers	4-1	Wycombe Wanderers
24	Staines Town	0-3	Yeovil Town
25	Tow Law Town	2-0	Altrincham
26	Welling United	5-2	Bromley
27	Wivenhoe Town	0-0	Halesowen Town
28	Wokingham Town	1-3	Woking

=== Replays ===
Tie	Home team	Score	Away team
3	Marlow	1-2	Basingstoke Town
5	Dorchester Town	5-1	Bognor Regis Town
7	Barnet	1-0	Burton Albion
8	Marine	0-0	Chorley
12	Merthyr Tydfil	4-2	Dulwich Hamlet
15	Hayes	3-0	Hythe Town
16	Chelmsford City	1-3	Kidderminster Harriers
18	Bishop Auckland	3-0	Mossley
20	Bath City	3-0	Poole Town
21	Bedworth United	0-2	Redditch United
27	Halesowen Town	3-2	Wivenhoe Town

=== 2nd replay ===
Tie	Home team	Score	Away team
8	Marine	3-0	Chorley

== 1989-90 FA Cup ==
See 1989-90 FA Cup for details of the rounds from the first round proper onwards.
