= Oldham Borough F.C. =

Coordinates: 53°31′06.68″N 2°07′18.31″W

Oldham Borough
- Full name: Oldham Borough Football Club
- Nickname: Borough
- Founded: 1964 (as Oldham Dew F.C.)
- Dissolved: 2015
- Ground: Seel Park, Mossley
- Capacity: 4000
- 2014–15: North West Counties League; Division One, 18th
Home colours	Away colours

Oldham Borough F.C. was an English association football club based in Oldham, Greater Manchester, England. The club was founded in 1964 as Oldham Dew F.C., changing their name in 1985 to Oldham Town, again in 2009 to Oldham Boro before making their final name change in 2014.

They were members of Division One of the North West Counties League until resigning in June 2015.

== History ==
Oldham Dew F.C. was established in 1964 by George Dew, a local building contractor, as a works football team. For the first two seasons, the club played amateur football with their home ground being at a local sports club, after which the club moved to Nordens Road.

After two seasons in amateur play, the club moved to Saturday football in the South East Lancashire League. The club gradually expanded and sought a higher level of competition, eventually moving into the Lancashire Combination League in 1981. In 1982 the Lancashire Combination merged with the Cheshire County League to form the North West Counties Football League, of which Dew were founder members in Division Three.

In 1985 the club changed its name from Oldham Dew to Oldham Town. At the end of that season they gained promotion to Division Two, before the resignation of Ken Hughes, as he became chairman of the club. They remained in that division (now named the First Division) until resigning in 2015.

Following Hughes's resignation, the club failed to win many honours as they would only win the Petit Cup and the Isle of Man Cup until the 1991–92. In 1991, the club started youth squads at Under-14 and Under-15 levels of competition – both of which gained quick success.

In October 2009 the club changed its name to Oldham Boro, and at the start of the 2014–15 season made a further change, adopting the name of Oldham Borough.

The club resigned from the league at the end of the 2014–15 season.

== Grounds ==
They played their home games at Seel Park, home of Mossley, in the 2014–15 season, having played the two previous seasons at Atherton Collieries A.F.C. Whitebank Stadium in Limeside, Oldham was their home between 1992 and 2012 having previously been based at Nordens Road, Chadderton since the mid-1960s.

In 2014, the club, who had spent the previous two seasons playing at the Atherton Collieries ground 18 miles outside Oldham after leaving the Whitebank Stadium, applied to Oldham Council to ground share at the Council owned Broadway ground with Chadderton F.C., however the application was rejected after objections from local councillors and the host club.

== Honours ==
- NWCFL Division Two
  - Champions 1997–98
  - Runners-up 1994–95
- NWCFL Division Two Trophy
  - Runners-up 2006–07
- NWCFL Division Three
  - Runners-up 1985–86
- NWCFL Reserve Division Cup
  - Winners 1994–95

== Records ==
- FA Cup
  - Second Qualifying Round 2003–04
- FA Vase
  - Second Round 1994–95, 1995–96, 2005–06, 2008–09
