= Whitworth Valley F.C. =

Association football club in England

Whitworth Valley
- Full name: Whitworth Valley Football Club

Whitworth Valley F.C. is an English association football club based in Whitworth, Lancashire. As of the 2025–26 football season, the club competes in the Lancashire Amateur League Premier Division.

== History ==
In the 1978–79 season, they joined the Lancashire Combination. The club competed in the North West Counties League during the 1980s. In 1988, they joined the Manchester League. In the 2005–06 season, they finished first of Division One with 77 points, getting promoted to the Premier Division.
