= Leyland Motors F.C. =

English football club

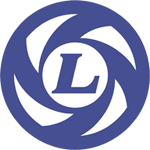
- Full name: Leyland Motors Football Club
- Nickname: Motors
- Dissolved: 2001
- Ground: County Ground, Leyland
Home colours

Leyland Motors Football Club was an English semi-professional football club playing their home matches at County Ground, Leyland.

== History ==
Leyland Motors played in the Lancashire Combination from 1933 until 1980 when they joined the Cheshire County League, where they played for two seasons, before becoming founder members of the North West Counties Football League in 1982. In 1990 they changed name to Leyland DAF-SGL and in 1992 were demoted to the West Lancashire Football League, before another name change to Leyland Motors Athletic in 1993. Then in 2001 they left the league altogether.

A separate club, also called Leyland Motors, competed in the Surrey Senior League.

== Colours ==
The club wore blue and white halves.

== Notable players ==
- * Former players ( 18 )
