= Irlam Town F.C. =

Irlam Town
- Full name: Irlam Town Football Club
- Dissolved: 1995
- Ground: Silver Street, Irlam, City of Salford
- 1994–95: North West Counties League; Division Two, 16th (folded)

Irlam Town F.C. was a football club from Irlam, Greater Manchester.

== History ==
Irlam Town competed in the FA Vase in the 1976–77 season and joined the Cheshire County League Division Two in 1978, and after finishing third in the 1981–82 season the club was successful in gaining promotion to the North West Counties Football League Division Two via application. This followed a run in the FA Vase where they reached the Fifth Round before being knocked out by Willenhall Town. Irlam Town was promoted to NWCFL Division One after finishing runners up in the 1984–85 season. After two season in this division, during which they made their debut in the FA Cup, the club was moved up to the Northern Premier League Division One, becoming a founding member. However, the club never had any success at this level and were relegated down two leagues in the 1991–92 season back to the NWCFL Division Two. After three seasons near the bottom of the league the club folded.

== Honours ==
- North West Counties Football League Division Two
  - Runners-up 1984–85

== Records ==
- FA Cup
  - Second Qualifying Round 1987–88, 1990–91
- FA Vase
  - Fifth Round 1981–82
- Highest league position
  - 13th, Northern Premier League Division One 1987–88
