= Colne Dynamoes F.C. =

Football club in England

Colne Dynamoes
- Full name: Colne Dynamoes Football Club
- Founded: 1963
- Dissolved: 1990
- Ground: Holt House, Colne
- Capacity: 2,000
Home colours

Colne Dynamoes Football Club was an English football club based in Colne, Lancashire. After spending much of their existence in the lower reaches of non-league football, heavy financial investment by former player turned millionaire chairman-manager, Graham White, saw the club rise rapidly through the leagues in the late 1980s. However, upon winning the Northern Premier League championship in 1989–90, the club was refused promotion to the Football Conference having failed to meet ground grading conditions, and was dissolved by White in the summer of 1990.

== History ==
The club was founded in 1963 by Graham White and Trevor Riddiough as a team for former students of Primet High School. They initially played in the Nelson and Colne League and were based on a pitch at Holt House. They won the league in their first season and after four seasons and three titles, the club joined the Burnley Combination where they achieved the League and Cup double straightaway. They moved to the West Lancashire League, winning Division Two in 1971 and winning four consecutive Division One titles from 1972 to 1975. In 1974 they also finally won the Lancashire Amateur Shield in their third final. After promotion through the local leagues the team moved from the old pitch to a pitch higher up the slope, which is now the current Holt House Stadium. It was originally used for cricket, but after the council granted planning permission (which caused controversy with cricket enthusiasts) the club developed a stadium on the site.

White's career as a player ended with injury and he became manager in 1975 with the team joining the Lancashire Combination, which saw a sustained period of success, with seven consecutive top-seven finishes, including being runners-up three years in a row between 1980 and 1982. The club were founder members of the North West Counties League in 1982 and were placed in the Third Division because of a low ground rating. They won the division at the first attempt, and were promoted to Division Two. By the mid-1980s White had become a millionaire through his property and timber business interests, and he began to invest money into the club.

Following 12 clubs leaving the North West Counties League to form the Northern Premier League's new First Division, Colne were elevated to the First Division for the start of the 1987–88 season despite only finishing 8th in the Second Division in the previous season. In 1988, a 200-seater stand was built. In the following season the club won the First Division championship on goal difference from Rossendale United, only losing three games and conceding 14 goals all season. They also won the FA Vase, beating Emley 1–0 in the Wembley final.

As North West Counties League champions, the club were promoted to the First Division of the Northern Premier League. With more investment in the playing squad, including the signing of former Liverpool player Alan Kennedy, 1988–89 saw the club win the First Division with only a single defeat, and subsequent promotion to the Premier Division.

In the summer of 1989 the club turned full-time, with some players earning more than those at Football League clubs. They won the Premier Division by a margin of 26 points with crowds averaging over 1,300, and reached the semi-finals of the FA Trophy where they lost to Conference side Barrow.

Despite winning the NPL, the club was refused promotion to the Conference as their Holt House ground did not meet the required grading. White attempted to arrange a groundshare with Burnley (a club he had attempted to buy in 1989), reportedly offering them £500,000 to play at Turf Moor, but was turned down. Following the rejection, plans were unveiled for a new stadium on the edge of neighbouring Nelson.

However, following a pre-season friendly against Newcastle Blue Star in the summer of 1990, White told the players that the club was to fold. Following the Colne fiasco he quit football amidst allegations of death threats and that the money had run out. North West Counties League football returned to the town when Colne F.C. were founded and elected straight into the league in 1996, with the new club taking over the Holt House ground.

== Colours ==
The club wore all red, with yellow trim.

== Honours ==
- FA Vase
  - Winners 1988
- Lancashire Amateur Shield
  - Winners 1974
- Northern Premier League
  - Premier Division champions 1989–90
  - Division One champions 1988–89
- North West Counties League
  - Division One champions 1987–88
  - Division Three champions 1982–83
- West Lancashire League
  - Division One champions 1971–72, 1972–73, 1973–74, 1974–75
  - Division Two champions 1970–71
- Burnley Combination
  - Champions 1967–68
- Nelson and Colne League
  - Champions 1963-64
