= Ford Motors F.C. =

Association football club in England

Ford Motors
- Full name: Ford Motors Football Club
- Nickname: Fords
- Founded: 1962
- Dissolved: September 2019
- Ground: Fords Sports & Social Club, Cronton, Widnes
- League: West Cheshire League Division One
- 2018–19: West Cheshire League Division One, 8th

Ford Motors Football Club was an English association football club. They competed in the West Cheshire Association Football League and reached the 4th round of the FA Vase in 1985.

They resigned from the West Cheshire League in September 2019 due to their manager resigning and a number of players leaving the club.
