= Eastwood Hanley F.C. =

Association football club in England

Coordinates: 53.015685°N 2.162708°W

- Full name: Eastwood Hanley Football Club
- Nickname: The Blues
- Founded: 1946 (original club); 2014 (modern club)
- Dissolved: 1997
- Ground: Trentmill Road, Hanley
- Capacity: 5,000
- Chairman: Kev Berrisford
- League: Staffordshire County Senior League Division One West
- 2024–25: Staffordshire County Senior League Division One North, withdrew
Home colours	Away colours

Eastwood Hanley Football Club is a football club based in Hanley, Stoke-on-Trent, Staffordshire, England. They are currently members of the Staffordshire County Senior League Division One West and play at Trentmill Road.

== History ==
=== Original club ===
Situated in the Joiners Square area of the city (south east of the main town Hanley), Eastwood played their home games at the Trentmill Road ground for the majority of their history. The club was established in 1946. In 1987, they joined the Northern Premier League Division One in its first season, and at their height were one of the best non-league teams in North Staffordshire rivalling Leek Town for the top position in the pyramid. Their one major honour came in 1986 when they won the Staffordshire Senior Cup.

They were forced out of their Trentmill Road home in the early 1990s due to regular vandalism of the site and although they groundshared with Kidsgrove and Newcastle for a few seasons, interest in the club waned and gates decreased. The club eventually folded in 1997.

=== Modern club ===
After a failed bid to revive the club in 2009, the club was re-established in 2014 when Sandford Hill Allstars adopted the name. They subsequently joined the Staffordshire County Senior League. Currently playing their home games at Eastwood Hanley stadium. The club now have a Development side that ply their trade in Division 2 of the Staffs County League also at Northwood Stadium.

== Honours ==
- North West Counties League Division Two
  - Runners-up 1983–84
- Mid-Cheshire League
  - Runners-up 1966–67
- Staffordshire Senior Cup
  - Winners 1985–86
- Staffs County League Division Two
  - Champions 2015–16

== Records ==
- FA Cup
  - Third Qualifying Round 1972–73, 1991–92, 1994–95
- FA Trophy
  - First Qualifying Round 1973–74, 1976–77, 1977–78
- FA Vase
  - Fifth Round 1988–89
