= 1984–85 Alliance Premier League =

Alliance Premier League
- Season: 1984–85
- Champions: Wealdstone (1st Alliance Premier League title)
- Promoted to the Football League: None
- Runners-up: Nuneaton Borough
- Relegated to Level 6: Gateshead, Worcester City, Yeovil Town
- Promoted for the next season: Cheltenham Town, Stafford Rangers, Wycombe Wanderers
- Matches: 462
- Goals: 1,343 (2.91 per match)
- Top goalscorer: Paul Culpin (Nuneaton Borough), 36
- Biggest home win: Barnet – Wealdstone 7–0
- Biggest away win: Bath City – Kettering Town 1–6; Gateshead – Enfield 0–6
- Highest scoring: Altrincham – Boston United 7–2; Weymouth – Gateshead 5–4
- Longest winning run: ?
- Longest unbeaten run: ?
- Longest losing run: ?
- Highest attendance: ?
- Lowest attendance: ?
- Average attendance: ?

The Alliance Premier League season of 1984–85 (known as the Gola League 1984–85 for sponsorship reasons) was the sixth season of the Alliance Premier League. This was the first year where the Isthmian League acted as an APL feeder league.

== New teams in the league this season ==
- Barrow (promoted 1983–84)
- Dartford (promoted 1983–84)

== Final table ==
Pos	Team	Pld	W	D	L	GF	GA	GD	Pts	Qualification or relegation
1	Wealdstone (C)	42	20	10	12	64	54	+10	62	
2	Nuneaton Borough	42	19	14	9	85	53	+32	58	
3	Dartford	42	17	13	12	57	48	+9	57	
4	Bath City	42	21	9	12	52	49	+3	57	
5	Altrincham	42	21	6	15	63	47	+16	56	
6	Scarborough	42	17	13	12	69	62	+7	54	
7	Enfield	42	17	13	12	84	61	+23	53	
8	Kidderminster Harriers	42	17	8	17	79	77	+2	51	
9	Northwich Victoria	42	16	11	15	50	46	+4	50	
10	Telford United	42	15	14	13	59	54	+5	49	
11	Frickley Athletic	42	18	7	17	65	71	−6	49	
12	Kettering Town	42	15	12	15	68	59	+9	48	
13	Maidstone United	42	15	13	14	58	51	+7	48	
14	Runcorn	42	13	15	14	48	47	+1	48	
15	Barnet	42	15	11	16	59	52	+7	47	
16	Weymouth	42	15	13	14	70	66	+4	45	
17	Boston United	42	15	10	17	69	69	0	45	
18	Barrow	42	11	16	15	47	57	−10	43	
19	Dagenham	42	13	10	19	47	67	−20	41	
20	Worcester City (R)	42	12	9	21	55	84	−29	38	Relegation to the Southern League Premier Division
21	Gateshead (R)	42	9	12	21	51	82	−31	33 (Note: Gateshead were deducted 1 point.)	Relegation to the Northern Premier League
22	Yeovil Town (R)	42	6	11	25	44	87	−43	25	Relegation to the Isthmian League Premier Division

Rules for classification: 2 points for a home win, 3 points for an away win, 1 point for a draw.
(C) Champions; (R) Relegated

== Results ==
Home \ Away	ALT	BAR	BRW	BAT	BOS	DAG	DAR	ENF	FRK	GAT	KET	KID	MDS	NOR	NUN	RUN	SCA	TEL	WEA	WEY	WRC	YEO
Altrincham		0–2	2–0	0–0	7–2	3–1	2–1	3–2	3–4	2–0	2–1	2–1	2–0	1–2	1–0	0–1	3–0	0–1	1–2	2–0	1–1	2–0
Barnet	1–0		4–0	2–1	1–0	0–0	0–1	3–2	1–2	1–1	4–2	2–4	0–0	1–1	1–1	1–1	1–2	0–1	7–0	0–0	2–0	4–1
Barrow	0–2	1–0		0–1	1–1	3–1	0–0	1–1	6–0	0–1	0–1	3–1	0–2	0–0	0–0	1–1	1–1	2–1	2–1	3–3	1–0	2–2
Bath City	1–0	2–1	1–2		2–1	2–0	1–0	1–0	3–0	1–1	1–6	0–2	1–0	0–3	1–0	0–1	2–1	2–1	3–1	2–1	3–1	1–0
Boston United	0–0	2–1	1–3	1–2		4–1	2–0	3–2	2–1	1–1	3–1	2–3	1–0	3–4	2–3	2–0	3–3	1–3	1–1	2–2	4–1	3–0
Dagenham	1–1	0–0	1–1	0–0	1–2		0–1	0–3	4–1	0–2	2–1	2–2	4–1	2–1	2–1	2–1	0–2	1–0	1–2	2–2	1–3	2–0
Dartford	1–0	2–0	2–0	1–3	1–1	3–0		1–2	0–2	1–2	0–1	2–1	1–1	1–0	2–2	1–1	3–1	0–0	2–3	1–1	2–3	1–1
Enfield	3–3	3–3	0–0	1–1	1–1	3–2	0–1		1–0	3–1	5–3	5–2	1–2	3–2	1–0	1–1	3–4	0–0	2–0	2–1	6–0	4–0
Frickley Athletic	2–1	3–1	2–2	2–0	2–1	0–2	2–4	1–0		1–0	3–0	3–0	1–3	4–0	1–1	1–1	2–3	1–2	0–2	2–0	2–1	3–1
Gateshead	0–1	0–2	1–2	1–1	1–2	2–1	0–0	0–5	3–2		1–4	4–1	2–1	2–6	0–2	0–3	3–1	1–1	1–2	2–2	2–2	1–1
Kettering Town	1–2	4–0	0–0	1–2	2–1	0–1	0–2	4–3	5–0	1–1		2–2	2–0	2–2	1–1	3–0	0–1	4–2	0–1	1–1	1–0	3–0
Kidderminster Harriers	0–2	1–4	0–1	2–2	2–0	5–1	1–1	1–3	2–4	3–0	2–2		2–1	3–1	3–4	0–1	3–2	0–2	0–3	3–3	4–1	3–0
Maidstone United	3–0	1–0	2–0	2–0	2–2	0–1	2–1	2–2	1–1	1–0	3–0	1–4		1–0	2–2	5–1	2–2	0–0	0–1	1–4	4–0	3–3
Northwich Victoria	1–2	2–0	1–0	3–1	1–0	0–1	0–1	1–1	3–0	2–0	1–2	0–2	0–0		1–0	0–1	1–1	1–0	0–2	0–3	2–2	2–0
Nuneaton Borough	4–1	1–1	5–2	0–0	4–2	2–2	5–1	2–2	0–0	3–0	1–1	1–1	3–2	2–2		2–1	5–2	2–1	1–0	4–2	3–0	5–0
Runcorn	1–2	2–1	0–0	0–0	1–2	3–0	1–1	1–1	0–0	1–1	2–2	1–2	1–4	0–0	1–0		1–1	3–0	2–0	3–1	1–2	3–0
Scarborough	2–1	1–1	1–1	2–0	1–0	5–0	1–3	2–3	1–2	5–1	0–0	2–1	1–0	0–0	3–2	0–0		4–1	1–1	0–0	1–2	2–1
Telford United	0–2	1–0	3–1	3–1	1–1	1–1	1–2	2–0	5–3	1–1	1–1	3–2	0–0	0–1	2–1	3–1	1–2		4–2	0–0	1–1	3–1
Wealdstone	1–0	1–2	2–2	0–1	0–1	0–0	0–0	1–2	1–1	4–2	1–0	5–2	1–1	1–1	3–1	1–0	1–0	2–2		3–2	3–3	0–3
Weymouth	2–1	3–0	3–1	2–2	2–1	1–0	1–2	4–2	2–1	5–4	3–0	0–2	0–1	1–0	1–3	0–2	1–2	3–2	0–3		3–1	4–2
Worcester City	1–1	1–2	3–2	1–2	2–1	1–3	2–5	1–0	2–1	4–1	1–2	1–2	1–1	0–1	1–4	2–0	4–1	0–0	0–4	1–1		0–2
Yeovil Town	1–2	2–1	1–2	3–2	2–4	2–1	2–2	0–0	1–2	0–4	1–1	0–0	3–0	0–1	1–2	1–3	2–2	3–3	0–2	0–0	1–2	

Updated to match(es) played on unknown. Source: Rothmans Football Yearbook 1985–86. Queen Anne Press, Macdonald Futura Publishers, London & Sydney, 1985; Football Conference statistics.
Note: For this season, the Rothmans Football Yearbook 1985–86 had 15 incorrect match results in their results grid, which rendered it as good as useless. Correct results were obtained from the Football Conference, courtesy of Dennis Strudwick, general manager, and John Harman, Statistician.
Legend: Blue = home team win; Yellow = draw; Red = away team win.
Locations of the Alliance Premier League teams 1984–1985
Locations of the Alliance Premier League 1984–1985 London teams

== Top scorers ==
Rank	Player	Club	League	FA Cup	FA Trophy	League Cup	Total
1	(England) Paul Culpin	Nuneaton Borough	36				
2	(England) Gary Hooley	Frickley Athletic	29				
3	(Scotland) Frank Murphy	Nuneaton	21				
=	(England) John Powell	Kidderminster Harriers	21				
5	(England) Paul Bennett	Altrincham	20				
6	(England) Paul Davies	Kidderminster Harriers	19				
=	(England) Dave Flint	Enfield	19				
=	(England) Bob Lee	Boston United	19				
=	(England) Steve Mahoney	Kidderminster Harriers	19				
10	(England) Ian Donaldson	Gateshead	17				
=	(England) Paul Moss	Worcester City	17				
12	(England) Mike Doherty	Weymouth	16				
=	(Scotland) Billy Jeffrey	Kettering Town	16				
=	(England) Gerry Pearson	Kidderminster Harriers	16				
15	(England) Mark Graves	Wealdstone	15				
16	(Scotland) Marshall Burke	Scarborough	13				
=	(England) Colin Cowperthwaite	Barrow	13				
=	(England) Nicky Evans	Barnet	13				
=	(England) Paul Reid	Northwich Victoria	13				
=	(England) Mark Smith	Kettering Town	13				
=	(England) Les Whitton	Dagenham	13				
22	(Jamaica) Carl Richards	Enfield	12				
23	(England) Mark Carter	Runcorn	11				

== Promotion and relegation ==
=== Promoted ===
- Cheltenham Town (from the Southern Premier League)
- Stafford Rangers (from the Northern Premier League)
- Wycombe Wanderers (from the Isthmian League)

=== Relegated ===
- Gateshead (to the Northern Premier League)
- Worcester City (to the Southern Premier League)
- Yeovil Town (to the Isthmian League)

== Election to the Football League ==
This year Wealdstone, the champions of the Alliance Premier League, could not apply for election because their stadium did not meet Football League requirements. 2nd placed Nuneaton could not apply either for the same reason, and nor could 3rd placed Dartford, so 4th placed Bath City won by default the right to apply for election to the Football League to replace one of the four bottom sides in the 1984–85 Football League Fourth Division. The voting went as follows:

Club	Final Position	Votes
Northampton Town	23rd (Fourth Division)	52
Stockport County	22nd (Fourth Division)	50
Torquay United	24th (Fourth Division)	50
Halifax Town	21st (Fourth Division)	48
Bath City	4th (Alliance Premier League)	8

As a result of this, Bath City failed to gain membership of the Football League.
