= 1983–84 Alliance Premier League =

Alliance Premier League
- Season: 1983–84
- Champions: Maidstone United (1st Alliance Premier League title)
- Promoted to the Football League: None
- Runners-up: Nuneaton Borough
- Relegated to Level 6: Bangor City, Trowbridge Town
- Promoted for the next season: Barrow, Dartford
- Matches: 462
- Goals: 1,290 (2.79 per match)
- Top goalscorer: Paul Culpin (Nuneaton Borough), 41
- Biggest home win: Frickley Athletic – Boston United 7–1; Maidstone United – Telford United 6–0; Wealdstone – Trowbridge Town 6–0
- Biggest away win: Barnet – Maidstone United 0–4; Boston United – Gateshead 0–4; Scarborough – Enfield 0–4; Trowbridge Town – Barnet 0–4; Weymouth – Wealdstone 0–4
- Highest scoring: Gateshead – Boston United 5–5
- Longest winning run: ?
- Longest unbeaten run: ?
- Longest losing run: ?
- Highest attendance: ?
- Lowest attendance: ?
- Average attendance: ?

The Alliance Premier League season of 1983–84 was the fifth season of the Alliance Premier League.

== New teams in the league this season ==
- Gateshead (promoted 1982–83)
- Kidderminster Harriers (promoted 1982–83)

== Final table ==
Pos	Team	Pld	W	D	L	GF	GA	GD	Pts	Qualification or relegation
1	Maidstone United (C)	42	23	13	6	71	34	+37	70	
2	Nuneaton Borough	42	24	11	7	70	40	+30	69	
3	Altrincham	42	23	9	10	64	39	+25	65	
4	Wealdstone	42	21	14	7	75	36	+39	62	
5	Runcorn	42	20	13	9	61	45	+16	62	
6	Bath City	42	17	12	13	60	48	+12	53	
7	Northwich Victoria	42	16	14	12	54	47	+7	51	
8	Worcester City	42	15	13	14	64	55	+9	49	
9	Barnet	42	16	10	16	55	58	−3	49	
10	Kidderminster Harriers	42	14	14	14	54	61	−7	49	
11	Telford United	42	17	11	14	50	58	−8	49	
12	Frickley Athletic	42	17	10	15	68	56	+12	48	
13	Scarborough	42	14	16	12	52	55	−3	48	
14	Enfield	42	14	9	19	61	58	+3	43	
15	Weymouth	42	13	8	21	54	65	−11	42	
16	Gateshead	42	12	13	17	59	73	−14	42	
17	Boston United	42	13	12	17	66	80	−14	41	
18	Dagenham	42	14	8	20	57	69	−12	40	
19	Kettering Town	42	12	9	21	53	67	−14	37	
20	Yeovil Town	42	12	8	22	55	77	−22	35	
21	Bangor City (R)	42	10	6	26	54	82	−28	29	Relegation to the Northern Premier League
22	Trowbridge Town (R)	42	5	7	30	33	87	−54	19	Relegation to the Southern League Premier Division

Rules for classification: 2 points for a home win, 3 points for an away win, 1 point for a draw.
(C) Champions; (R) Relegated

== Results ==
Home \ Away	ALT	BAN	BAR	BAT	BOS	DAG	ENF	FRK	GAT	KET	KID	MDS	NOR	NUN	RUN	SCA	TEL	TRO	WEA	WEY	WRC	YEO
Altrincham		2–1	3–2	2–0	3–0	4–0	1–3	1–0	5–0	1–1	0–1	1–0	1–1	0–1	1–3	2–0	1–1	4–0	1–0	2–1	3–4	2–1
Bangor City	1–3		0–1	1–0	0–0	2–4	2–1	4–1	3–3	3–1	1–2	0–2	0–1	1–2	2–3	1–1	4–0	4–0	0–0	1–3	2–4	3–0
Barnet	1–2	3–1		1–2	1–2	3–1	2–1	3–2	0–1	0–3	0–2	0–4	2–1	1–2	2–0	0–1	0–0	2–1	1–1	1–1	2–0	2–0
Bath City	0–0	5–1	0–1		4–2	0–1	3–2	1–0	1–1	1–1	3–0	1–2	2–0	0–1	1–1	4–1	1–1	2–1	0–0	1–0	0–0	3–1
Boston United	2–2	3–2	0–0	0–0		3–0	3–2	2–2	0–4	3–1	2–3	1–0	3–1	3–0	1–2	1–1	2–3	2–0	1–1 (Note: The Rothmans Football Yearbook 1984–85 had one incorrect result, which is corrected in the results grid below: the result for Boston – Wealdstone was 1–1, not 2–2 as Rothmans had it.)	4–3	0–1	3–2
Dagenham	0–2	3–1	3–1	3–1	2–0		1–4	1–1	1–2	2–0	0–0	0–1	3–1	4–2	0–2	1–1	1–2	6–2	1–0	1–2	0–1	1–0
Enfield	0–1	3–1	0–1	2–0	1–0	3–0		3–3	0–3	2–2	0–1	0–3	1–2	0–1	0–1	2–1	3–1	2–1	0–2	0–1	2–2	3–0
Frickley Athletic	3–1	2–0	3–1	1–2	7–1	4–0	1–1		4–1	1–1	0–2	2–0	4–1	1–3	2–1	2–1	1–1	2–0	2–5	1–2	3–1	3–0
Gateshead	0–1	2–1	2–3	3–1	5–5	1–1	1–1	2–0		1–2	1–0	0–2	1–3	1–1	1–1	1–1	2–1	2–2	1–1	3–0	1–1	4–2
Kettering Town	1–1	1–3	0–1	0–0	2–1	2–2	1–0	0–1	3–0		4–2	0–2	1–0	3–4	1–0	2–3	4–1	3–2	1–2	0–2	0–1	2–3
Kidderminster Harriers	0–2	2–1	4–4	1–1	1–1	4–2	1–1	1–1	1–0	3–1		0–0	2–2	3–3	0–2	1–3	1–0	1–1	3–1	0–1	2–1	1–2
Maidstone United	1–0	2–0	1–1	1–1	2–2	2–0	1–1	3–1	1–0	1–0	3–1		0–1	1–0	1–1	1–1	6–0	4–1	2–1	2–2	1–1	4–0
Northwich Victoria	1–1	2–1	0–0	3–2	3–1	3–1	3–1	1–1	3–1	4–0	4–2	1–1		1–1	0–1	3–1	0–0	0–2	1–1	1–0	1–0	0–0
Nuneaton Borough	0–1	3–0	2–2	5–2	4–0	1–1	4–0	1–0	3–2	1–0	2–1	2–2	1–0		2–2	3–0	1–1	2–1	1–1	3–0	1–0	2–1
Runcorn	0–0	0–2	2–0	2–1	3–1	1–0	0–0	2–1	4–2	4–1	1–1	0–0	0–0	0–1		2–0	0–0	2–0	4–2	1–1	2–1	4–4
Scarborough	3–1	3–0	1–0	0–0	2–0	0–0	0–4	3–1	1–1	0–0	2–0	1–1	1–1	1–0	2–1		3–0	0–0	1–1	1–1	4–4	3–0
Telford United	2–1	2–1	0–0	3–2	3–2	3–1	0–3	0–1	4–0	1–0	3–0	3–1	0–2	1–0	1–1	1–0		1–0	0–1	0–1	2–0	2–2
Trowbridge Town	0–0	1–2	0–4	1–2	0–2	1–4	0–0	0–1	0–2	1–2	1–2	1–2	1–1	0–2	0–1	1–0	2–2		1–2	1–2	2–1	1–0
Wealdstone	3–1	5–0	3–0	0–3	1–1	1–0	2–1	0–0	4–0	4–2	2–0	1–2	1–0	0–0	4–2	1–1	4–0	6–0		2–0	3–1	1–0
Weymouth	0–1	5–0	2–2	0–1	0–2	3–1	1–3	0–2	2–0	1–1	0–0	1–3	1–1	0–1	3–1	6–1	2–3	0–1	0–4		0–2	1–3
Worcester City	0–1	0–0	2–0	2–4	2–2	2–2	1–3	0–0	3–1	0–3	1–1	3–0	2–0	1–1	3–0	3–0	0–1	5–2	1–1	1–0		4–0
Yeovil Town	1–2	1–1	2–4	0–2	4–2	0–2	3–2	3–0	0–0	2–0	1–1	1–3	2–0	1–0	0–1	1–2	1–0	3–1	0–0	6–3	2–2	

Updated to match(es) played on unknown. Source: Rothmans Football Yearbook 1984–85. Queen Anne Press, Macdonald Futura Publishers, London & Sydney, 1984.
Legend: Blue = home team win; Yellow = draw; Red = away team win.
Notes:
Locations of the Alliance Premier League teams 1983–1984
Locations of the Alliance Premier League 1983–1984 London teams

== Top scorers ==
Rank	Player	Club	League	FA Cup	FA Trophy	League Cup	Total
1	(England) Paul Culpin	Nuneaton Borough	41				
2	(England) Mark Graves	Wealdstone	31				
3	(England) John Bartley	Maidstone United	27				
4	(England) Steve Mahoney	Barnet	19				
5	(Wales) Graham Bennett	Altrincham	17				
=	(England) Mark Carter	Bangor City	17				
=	(England) Gary Hooley	Frickley Athletic	17				
=	(England) Paul Moss	Worcester City	17				
=	(England) Graham Reed	Frickley Athletic	17				
10	(Scotland) Frank Murphy	Nuneaton	16				
11	(England) Noel Ashford	Enfield	15				
=	(England) Chris Cook	Boston United	15				
=	(England) Dave Hoffbauer	Kettering Town	15				
=	(England) John Powell	Kidderminster Harriers	15				
15	(England) Stuart Atkins	Barnet	14				
=	(England) Mike Doherty	Yeovil Town	14				
=	(England) Paul Wilson	Frickley Athletic	14				
18	(England) Bob Topping	Gateshead	13				
19	(England) Paul Reid	Northwich Victoria	12				
20	(England) Colin Chesters	Northwich Victoria	11				
=	(England) Colin Williams	Telford United	11				

== Promotion and relegation ==
=== Promoted ===
- Barrow (from the Northern Premier League)
- Dartford (from the Southern Premier League)

=== Relegated ===
- Bangor City (to the Northern Premier League)
- Trowbridge Town (to the Southern Premier League)

== Election to the Football League ==
As winners of the Alliance Premier League, Maidstone United won the right (for the 2nd time) to apply for election to the Football League to replace one of the four bottom sides in the 1983–84 Football League Fourth Division. The vote went as follows:

Club	Final Position	Votes
Chester City	24th (Fourth Division)	52
Halifax Town	21st (Fourth Division)	52
Rochdale	22nd (Fourth Division)	50
Hartlepool United	23rd (Fourth Division)	32
Maidstone United	1st (Alliance Premier League)	22

As a result of this, Maidstone United did not gain membership of the Football League.
