= 1985–86 Alliance Premier League =

Alliance Premier League
- Season: 1985–86
- Champions: Enfield (2nd Alliance Premier League title)
- Promoted to the Football League: None
- FA Trophy winners: Altrincham
- Relegated to Level 6: Barrow, Dartford, Wycombe Wanderers
- Promoted for the next season: Gateshead, Sutton, Welling United
- Matches: 462
- Goals: 1,377 (2.98 per match)
- Top goalscorer: Kim Casey (Kidderminster Harriers), 36
- Biggest home win: Kidderminster Harriers – Wycombe Wanderers 8–2; Bath City – Barrow 6–0
- Biggest away win: Cheltenham Town – Kidderminster Harriers 2–6; Barrow – Runcorn 0–4
- Highest scoring: Altrincham – Nuneaton Borough 7–4
- Longest winning run: ?
- Longest unbeaten run: ?
- Longest losing run: ?
- Highest attendance: ?
- Lowest attendance: ?
- Average attendance: ?

The Alliance Premier League season of 1985–86 (known as the Gola League 1985–86 for sponsorship reasons) was the seventh season of the Alliance Premier League. This was the first year where a team from the Isthmian League had been promoted to the APL, and this was the last season of the league under this name - starting with the 1986–87 season, the league would be renamed to the Football Conference.

== New teams in the league this season ==
- Cheltenham Town (promoted 1984–85)
- Stafford Rangers (promoted 1984–85)
- Wycombe Wanderers (promoted 1984-85)

== Final league table ==
Pos	Team	Pld	W	D	L	GF	GA	GD	Pts	Qualification or relegation
1	Enfield (C)	42	27	10	5	94	47	+47	76	
2	Frickley Athletic	42	25	10	7	78	50	+28	69	
3	Kidderminster Harriers	42	24	7	11	99	62	+37	67	
4	Altrincham	42	22	11	9	70	49	+21	63	
5	Weymouth	42	19	15	8	75	60	+15	61	
6	Runcorn	42	19	14	9	70	44	+26	60	
7	Stafford Rangers	42	19	13	10	61	54	+7	60	
8	Telford United	42	18	10	14	68	66	+2	51	
9	Kettering Town	42	15	15	12	55	53	+2	49	
10	Wealdstone	42	16	9	17	57	56	+1	47	
11	Cheltenham Town	42	16	11	15	69	69	0	46	
12	Bath City	42	13	11	18	53	54	−1	45	
13	Boston United	42	16	7	19	66	76	−10	44	
14	Barnet	42	13	11	18	56	60	−4	41	
15	Scarborough	42	13	11	18	54	66	−12	40	
16	Northwich Victoria	42	10	12	20	42	54	−12	37	
17	Maidstone United	42	9	16	17	57	66	−9	36	
18	Nuneaton Borough	42	13	5	24	58	73	−15	36	
19	Dagenham	42	10	12	20	48	66	−18	36	
20	Wycombe Wanderers (R)	42	10	13	19	55	84	−29	36	Relegation to the Isthmian League Premier Division
21	Dartford (R)	42	8	9	25	51	82	−31	26	Relegation to the Southern League Premier Division
22	Barrow (R)	42	7	8	27	41	86	−45	24	Relegation to the Northern Premier League

Rules for classification: 2 points for a home win, 3 points for an away win, 1 point for a draw.
(C) Champions; (R) Relegated

== Results ==
Home \ Away	ALT	BAR	BRW	BAT	BOS	CHL	DAG	DAR	ENF	FRK	KET	KID	MDS	NOR	NUN	RUN	SCA	STA	TEL	WEA	WEY	WYC
Altrincham		2–0	2–0	1–2	1–3	4–1	3–1	0–0	1–4	1–0	2–2	2–1	1–0	2–1	7–4	1–1	2–0	1–3	1–0	1–0	3–1	4–3
Barnet	2–2		4–1	1–0	3–0	2–2	4–1	2–0	0–1	1–2	3–0	0–1	3–3	1–0	0–1	1–2	1–0	0–2	1–2	1–0	2–2	0–1
Barrow	0–1	0–1		1–1	2–1	2–2	1–0	1–2	1–2	2–2	1–0	3–4	1–1	1–2	2–0	0–4	2–4	0–1	1–0	1–1	3–4	1–1
Bath City	0–2	1–1	6–0		2–0	1–1	1–1	2–0	0–2	1–2	1–1	2–4	1–1	0–0	0–2	0–1	0–0	0–1	3–0	2–3	2–2	3–1
Boston United	1–3	1–2	2–1	1–1		1–2	3–0	3–0	1–2	0–3	4–1	2–1	2–2	3–0	3–2	2–1	2–1	1–1	2–2	1–0	5–0	1–1
Cheltenham Town	2–0	2–1	2–0	1–2	2–1		2–2	3–1	2–0	1–1	5–1	2–6	2–1	2–0	5–3	1–1	5–1	2–0	1–1	1–2	0–1	4–2
Dagenham	1–3	2–1	3–0	0–1	2–2	1–3		2–1	0–2	0–0	1–0	0–1	0–0	1–0	3–2	2–3	0–0	1–1	1–4	0–2	2–2	1–1
Dartford	3–2	5–3	3–2	1–2	0–1	3–3	1–1		2–3	1–2	0–2	5–1	1–1	2–0	0–1	0–1	1–1	3–3	2–1	1–2	1–1	1–0
Enfield	1–1	1–0	4–0	3–1	3–0	1–0	3–1	1–0		3–1	1–1	2–2	1–3	1–0	3–2	2–0	4–0	3–1	4–1	1–0	4–4	2–3
Frickley Athletic	0–0	3–3	2–0	2–1	5–1	2–1	3–2	1–0	1–4		3–0	3–1	2–0	1–0	2–2	3–1	2–1	3–0	3–1	2–1	1–0	2–2
Kettering Town	2–2	1–1	4–2	2–0	3–1	2–1	0–2	2–2	2–1	2–0		2–2	2–0	2–1	1–4	0–0	0–0	0–1	4–0	2–1	0–2	4–1
Kidderminster Harriers	0–2	0–2	2–1	3–1	3–2	5–1	2–0	4–1	1–2	1–0	0–0		3–1	2–2	2–1	2–4	5–1	1–1	3–0	3–1	1–2	8–2
Maidstone United	1–2	2–2	0–0	3–2	1–2	1–0	2–1	3–0	3–3	3–2	0–0	2–1		0–1	5–1	1–1	1–1	2–4	4–4	0–1	0–0	1–1
Northwich Victoria	1–2	0–1	0–1	1–2	3–4	3–1	0–1	2–0	2–2	2–3	0–0	0–0	1–0		0–3	1–1	0–0	2–0	0–1	2–2	0–1	4–0
Nuneaton Borough	0–0	4–1	0–1	2–3	0–1	0–1	1–2	3–1	1–5	0–1	0–3	0–3	1–0	1–3		1–0	3–1	3–0	1–1	0–0	3–0	3–0
Runcorn	2–1	0–0	3–1	2–0	3–0	5–0	1–1	5–0	1–1	2–2	0–1	0–2	3–0	2–3	3–1		0–0	3–0	1–0	1–1	1–2	2–1
Scarborough	1–0	3–1	3–1	2–1	2–1	2–1	2–1	1–1	1–3	2–3	2–3	3–5	2–0	0–0	2–1	1–1		2–4	3–1	0–1	1–1	1–2
Stafford Rangers	1–1	0–0	1–0	1–0	2–1	2–0	3–1	5–1	1–1	0–0	0–0	3–2	2–1	1–2	2–0	1–1	0–3		0–3	2–1	2–3	1–1
Telford United	2–1	2–2	3–1	1–0	2–1	3–0	2–1	2–1	2–2	2–1	2–2	0–1	2–4	4–0	1–1	2–3	1–0	0–0		2–1	4–1	3–1
Wealdstone	2–2	2–0	4–0	0–1	7–2	0–0	0–4	2–1	2–4	2–0	3–1	0–3	3–2	0–0	1–0	1–1	0–3	2–3	1–1		1–0	2–0
Weymouth	0–0	4–2	3–2	0–0	0–0	0–0	2–1	2–1	2–2	2–3	1–0	1–2	2–0	2–2	2–0	5–2	4–1	1–1	5–2	4–2		1–1
Wycombe Wanderers	0–1	2–0	1–1	1–4	4–1	3–3	1–1	3–2	1–0	1–3	0–0	2–5	2–2	1–1	2–0	0–1	2–1	2–4	1–2	1–0	0–3	

Updated to match(es) played on unknown. Source: Peter Dunk (ed.), Rothmans Football Yearbook 1986–87. Queen Anne Press, Macdonald & Co., London & Sydney, 1986.
Legend: Blue = home team win; Yellow = draw; Red = away team win.
Locations of the Alliance Premier League teams 1985–1986
Locations of the Alliance Premier League 1985–1986 London teams

== Top scorers ==
Rank	Player	Club	League	FA Cup	FA Trophy	League Cup	Total
1	(England) Kim Casey	Kidderminster Harriers	36				
2	(Jamaica) Carl Richards	Enfield	28				
3	(England) Mike Doherty	Weymouth	25				
4	(England) Mick Carter	Runcorn	22				
5	(England) Paul Davies	Kidderminster Harriers	21				
6	(England) Nicky Evans	Barnet	20				
=	(England) Gary Hooley	Frickley Athletic / Scarborough	20				
8	(England) Ken McKenna	Telford United	18				
=	(England) Paul Wilson	Frickley Athletic	18				
10	(Wales) Graham Bennett	Stafford Rangers	17				
11	(England) Mark Boyland	Cheltenham Town	16				
=	(England) Dave Gilbert	Boston United	16				
13	(England) Colin Cowperthwaite	Barrow	15				
=	(Scotland) Frank Murphy	Nuneaton Borough	15				
15	(England) Tony Burman	Dartford	14				
=	(England) David Singleton	Bath City	14				
=	(England) Tim Smithers	Nuneaton Borough	14				
=	(Wales) Chris Townsend	Cheltenham Town	14				
19	(England) Tony Agana	Weymouth	13				
=	(England) Noel Ashford	Enfield	13				
21	(England) Phil Derbyshire	Stafford Rangers	12				
22	(England) Bob Mountain	Stafford Rangers	11				
23	(England) Stephen Claridge	Weymouth	10				

== Promotion and relegation ==
=== Promoted ===
- Gateshead (from the Northern Premier League)
- Sutton (from the Isthmian League)
- Welling United (from the Southern Premier League)

=== Relegated ===
- Wycombe Wanderers (to the Isthmian League)
- Dartford (to the Southern Premier League)
- Barrow (to the Northern Premier League)

== Election to the Football League ==
As winners of the Alliance Premier League, Enfield won the right to apply for election to the Football League to replace one of the four bottom sides in the 1985–86 Football League Fourth Division. The vote went as follows:

Club	Final Position	Votes
Exeter City	21st (Fourth Division)	64
Preston North End	23rd (Fourth Division)	62.5
Cambridge United	22nd (Fourth Division)	61
Torquay United	24th (Fourth Division)	61
Enfield	1st (Alliance Premier League)	7.5

As a result Enfield did not gain membership of the Football League. This was the final season in which the team who won the Conference National had to apply for election to the Football League, and from the 1986–87 season onward the winning team was automatically promoted, on the provision that they met the various conditions that the Football League set for all its members.
