= 1985–86 Northern Premier League =

Northern Premier League
- Season: 1985–86
- Champions: Gateshead
- Promoted: Gateshead
- Relegated: none
- Matches: 462
- Goals: 1,275 (2.76 per match)

The 1985–86 Northern Premier League season was the 18th in the history of the Northern Premier League, a football competition in England. It was known as the Mulipart Premier League for sponsorship reasons.

== Overview ==
The League featured twenty-two clubs.

=== Team changes ===
The following two clubs left the League at the end of the previous season:

- Stafford Rangers promoted to Alliance Premier League
- Grantham relegated to Southern League Midland Division

The following two clubs joined the League at the start of the season:

- Gateshead relegated from Alliance Premier League
- Caernarfon Town promoted from North West Counties League Division One

=== League table ===
Pos	Team	Pld	W	D	L	GF	GA	GD	Pts	Qualification or relegation
1	Gateshead (C, P)	42	24	10	8	85	51	+34	82	Promoted to Football Conference
2	Marine	42	23	11	8	63	35	+28	80	
3	Morecambe	42	17	17	8	59	39	+20	68	
4	Gainsborough Trinity	42	18	14	10	66	52	+14	68	
5	Burton Albion	42	18	12	12	64	47	+17	66	
6	Southport	42	17	11	14	70	66	+4	62	
7	Worksop Town	42	17	10	15	51	48	+3	61	
8	Workington	42	14	18	10	54	46	+8	59 (Note: Workington, Witton Albion, Horwich RMI and Goole Town all had 1 point deducted.)	
9	Macclesfield Town	42	17	8	17	67	65	+2	59	
10	Hyde United	42	14	15	13	63	62	+1	57	
11	Witton Albion	42	15	13	14	56	59	−3	57	
12	Mossley	42	13	16	13	56	60	−4	55	
13	Bangor City	42	13	15	14	51	51	0	54	
14	Rhyl	42	14	10	18	65	71	−6	52	
15	South Liverpool	42	11	17	14	43	44	−1	50	
16	Horwich RMI	42	15	6	21	53	63	−10	50	
17	Caernarfon Town	42	11	17	14	51	63	−12	50	
18	Oswestry Town	42	12	13	17	51	60	−9	49	
19	Buxton	42	11	12	19	55	76	−21	45	
20	Chorley	42	9	15	18	56	64	−8	42	
21	Matlock Town	42	9	15	18	59	75	−16	42	
22	Goole Town	42	7	11	24	37	78	−41	31	

(C) Champions; (P) Promoted

== Results ==
Home \ Away	BAN	BRT	BUX	CNR	CHO	GAI	GAT	GOO	HOR	HYD	MAC	MAR	MAT	MOR	MOS	OSW	RHL	SLI	SOU	WTN	WRK	WKS
Bangor City		2–2	1–0	0–1	1–1	3–1	0–2	1–3	3–1	0–1	0–0	1–2	3–2	0–0	1–0	4–0	1–1	2–1	2–3	1–0	1–1	1–0
Burton Albion	0–0		2–0	1–0	2–1	1–0	1–3	5–1	3–0	0–0	1–2	1–1	2–1	1–1	2–2	0–3	2–1	1–0	2–3	3–2	2–0	0–1
Buxton	2–0	1–0		1–3	1–0	0–0	1–5	2–2	1–0	3–2	1–2	0–2	6–2	2–4	0–3	4–2	2–0	0–0	3–2	1–2	1–1	1–1
Caernarfon Town	1–3	0–0	1–1		1–9	2–2	0–0	1–0	2–0	2–1	1–2	3–1	1–0	3–3	2–1	5–2	1–1	0–0	3–2	0–0	2–2	1–1
Chorley	0–4	0–5	0–0	1–1		0–2	1–1	4–0	1–3	2–2	1–4	0–1	1–1	0–2	0–1	3–1	2–1	2–1	1–1	0–0	2–0	2–1
Gainsborough Trinity	2–0	0–1	4–1	1–0	2–1		2–2	2–1	0–3	2–1	3–1	1–1	4–3	3–0	3–0	2–0	6–2	2–3	5–0	1–1	2–2	1–0
Gateshead	3–0	2–0	5–0	3–2	1–0	4–0		2–0	3–1	1–1	1–3	1–1	2–2	4–2	2–0	2–2	5–4	1–0	3–1	2–0	0–2	2–0
Goole Town	1–1	1–5	2–1	0–1	0–4	1–2	0–2		1–1	1–3	0–0	0–0	2–0	1–2	2–0	2–1	0–3	1–1	1–5	1–1	0–1	2–3
Horwich RMI	1–2	2–1	2–2	1–0	0–0	2–1	2–1	4–0		1–4	2–0	2–3	3–1	2–1	0–1	2–1	2–1	0–1	1–1	0–1	0–3	1–3
Hyde United	0–4	0–0	2–1	2–0	2–1	2–2	3–3	3–2	1–0		0–1	1–3	2–0	0–0	2–0	0–1	3–0	2–2	0–2	2–2	2–2	3–1
Macclesfield Town	4–0	2–1	2–1	7–2	1–1	0–1	1–0	2–1	7–2	2–3		0–1	3–2	0–2	0–1	2–3	0–0	2–2	0–1	1–1	1–1	1–2
Marine	1–1	1–3	2–3	3–1	3–1	3–0	3–1	1–0	1–0	3–0	4–0		1–3	1–0	2–0	2–0	2–3	0–1	2–3	3–1	1–0	1–2
Matlock Town	2–2	0–2	3–2	1–1	2–2	1–1	1–1	3–0	1–3	1–1	0–2	0–0		1–0	4–4	2–3	1–1	2–1	2–1	1–2	2–1	4–2
Morecambe	1–0	1–0	4–1	1–1	1–1	1–1	2–0	2–0	1–1	1–1	5–1	0–0	0–1		0–2	2–0	2–2	1–1	2–1	4–1	0–0	1–0
Mossley	0–0	3–3	2–1	1–0	2–2	2–2	0–0	1–1	3–2	2–2	5–1	1–1	2–2	1–1		1–0	1–3	0–2	1–2	0–2	1–2	3–1
Oswestry Town	0–0	3–1	0–0	0–0	2–0	1–1	0–1	0–1	1–0	2–2	2–4	0–0	3–0	0–0	0–0		2–3	2–1	2–4	2–0	0–1	1–1
Rhyl	3–1	1–0	3–0	3–2	4–1	0–0	2–3	1–1	0–1	3–3	1–0	0–2	2–2	4–2	0–2	1–2		1–1	1–3	2–4	1–3	0–1
South Liverpool	1–1	2–2	1–2	1–0	2–1	1–1	1–2	2–2	1–0	0–1	0–0	1–2	1–0	0–0	2–2	0–0	1–2		1–2	2–0	0–1	0–2
Southport	3–1	1–2	2–2	3–3	2–1	2–0	3–1	3–1	2–0	2–0	0–2	0–0	2–2	0–3	1–1	0–3	0–1	1–2		1–2	2–2	0–0
Witton Albion	1–1	1–1	1–1	1–1	0–3	1–2	0–2	1–0	1–4	3–2	3–2	0–1	1–1	1–2	5–1	3–1	2–0	1–1	1–1		2–1	1–0
Workington	2–1	1–2	2–1	0–0	1–1	1–1	4–2	1–1	0–0	3–1	3–0	0–0	1–0	0–0	1–2	3–3	0–2	0–0	2–2	1–3		0–1
Worksop Town	1–1	1–1	2–2	1–0	2–2	3–0	1–2	0–1	2–1	1–0	4–2	0–1	1–0	0–2	1–1	0–0	2–1	0–2	2–0	3–1	1–2	

Updated to match(es) played on 3 May 1986. Source: Northern Premier Division results grid
Legend: Blue = home team win; Yellow = draw; Red = away team win.

== Cup Results ==
Challenge Cup:

- Hyde United bt. Marine

President's Cup:

- Worksop Town 3–2 Burton Albion

Northern Premier League Shield: Between Champions of NPL Premier Division and Winners of the NPL Cup.

- Hyde United 2–4 Gateshead

== End of the season ==
At the end of the eighteenth season of the Northern Premier League, Gateshead applied to join the Football Conference and were successful.

=== Promotion and relegation ===
The following club left the League at the end of the season:

- Gateshead promoted to Football Conference

The following club joined the League the following season:

- Barrow relegated from Alliance Premier League
