= 1984–85 Northern Premier League =

Northern Premier League
- Season: 1984–85
- Champions: Stafford Rangers
- Promoted: Stafford Rangers
- Relegated: Grantham
- Matches: 462
- Goals: 1,295 (2.8 per match)

The 1984–85 Northern Premier League season was the 17th in the history of the Northern Premier League, a football competition in England.

== Overview ==
The League featured twenty-two clubs.

=== Team changes ===
The following club left the League at the end of the previous season:

- Barrow promoted to Alliance Premier League

The following club joined the League at the start of the season:

- Bangor City relegated from Alliance Premier League

=== League table ===
Pos	Team	Pld	W	D	L	GF	GA	GD	Pts	Qualification or relegation
1	Stafford Rangers (C, P)	42	26	8	8	81	40	+41	86	Promoted to Alliance Premier League
2	Macclesfield Town	42	23	13	6	67	39	+28	82	
3	Witton Albion	42	22	8	12	57	39	+18	74	
4	Hyde United	42	21	8	13	68	52	+16	71	
5	Marine	42	18	15	9	59	34	+25	69	
6	Burton Albion	42	18	15	9	70	49	+21	69	
7	Worksop Town	42	19	10	13	68	56	+12	67	
8	Workington	42	18	9	15	59	53	+6	63	
9	Horwich RMI	42	16	14	12	67	50	+17	62	
10	Bangor City	42	17	9	16	70	61	+9	60	Qualification for the 1985–86 Cup Winners' Cup first round
11	Gainsborough Trinity	42	14	14	14	72	73	−1	56	
12	Southport	42	15	9	18	65	66	−1	54	
13	Matlock Town	42	14	9	19	56	66	−10	51	
14	Oswestry Town	42	14	9	19	59	75	−16	51	
15	Mossley	42	14	9	19	45	65	−20	51	
16	Goole Town	42	13	11	18	60	65	−5	50	
17	Rhyl	42	11	14	17	52	63	−11	47	
18	Morecambe	42	11	14	17	51	67	−16	47	
19	Chorley	42	12	10	20	47	63	−16	46	
20	South Liverpool	42	9	15	18	43	71	−28	42	
21	Grantham (R)	42	8	13	21	41	69	−28	36 (Note: Grantham had 1 point deducted.)	Relegated to Southern League Midland Division
22	Buxton	42	8	6	28	38	79	−41	30	

(C) Champions; (P) Promoted; (R) Relegated

== Results ==
Home \ Away	BAN	BRT	BUX	CHO	GAI	GOO	GRN	HOR	HYD	MAC	MAR	MAT	MOR	MOS	OSW	RHL	SLI	SOU	STA	WTN	WRK	WKS
Bangor City		1–2	1–2	6–1	3–1	8–0	0–3	2–1	2–1	2–1	1–2	3–0	3–1	1–1	1–1	2–0	1–0	1–2	3–1	1–0	1–1	1–4
Burton Albion	1–1		2–0	1–1	1–0	5–1	2–2	1–0	1–1	2–2	1–1	2–0	2–1	6–0	2–2	1–1	4–0	3–0	1–4	0–0	3–1	1–1
Buxton	0–3	2–1		1–0	2–2	0–1	1–0	0–2	1–2	0–1	0–2	1–2	1–1	0–2	4–0	0–1	1–3	0–2	0–1	2–1	0–1	1–1
Chorley	2–0	2–3	2–0		3–2	2–1	0–2	1–1	3–3	0–3	0–1	1–0	0–1	1–1	0–1	2–1	5–2	2–2	3–2	0–1	0–0	1–2
Gainsborough Trinity	1–1	1–1	4–2	2–0		3–0	0–1	1–3	1–3	4–3	0–4	1–3	1–1	4–0	2–2	2–2	6–1	2–4	2–2	1–0	3–2	2–6
Goole Town	1–2	2–3	0–0	2–2	1–1		4–1	1–1	0–1	1–2	1–2	0–2	2–0	1–1	3–0	3–0	0–0	2–2	1–2	1–0	1–4	4–0
Grantham Town	4–3	2–0	3–0	0–3	2–2	1–1		2–0	0–0	0–0	0–1	1–2	4–0	2–2	0–0	0–0	0–2	0–2	1–1	1–1	0–1	0–0
Horwich RMI	3–0	1–3	1–0	1–0	4–1	1–2	2–0		0–1	0–0	2–0	1–1	4–1	1–1	1–0	3–3	2–2	1–2	1–1	0–2	3–0	1–1
Hyde United	1–1	0–2	4–1	2–1	0–1	2–3	4–0	2–1		1–3	2–0	2–1	2–0	1–3	0–1	3–1	3–0	3–1	1–2	2–1	2–2	1–3
Macclesfield Town	0–1	3–1	1–0	0–0	3–2	1–1	2–1	2–1	0–0		0–0	3–1	3–2	2–0	6–2	0–0	1–0	2–2	2–1	1–3	3–1	2–1
Marine	2–0	1–1	2–1	1–0	2–0	2–1	2–0	2–2	1–1	0–0		0–0	0–1	5–0	0–1	1–1	1–1	3–0	2–3	2–0	1–1	3–1
Matlock Town	2–1	3–1	2–1	2–0	1–1	0–5	0–1	2–3	1–2	1–2	0–0		4–2	2–1	4–2	0–4	2–2	2–2	1–2	1–1	0–2	3–0
Morecambe	1–4	1–3	1–2	0–0	0–1	1–1	3–0	1–1	3–1	3–2	1–1	2–2		1–1	3–1	3–4	2–2	1–1	0–1	3–1	0–0	2–1
Mossley	1–0	3–0	0–4	2–0	1–0	1–3	2–2	0–2	1–1	1–0	1–0	2–1	0–2		2–1	1–0	4–0	2–0	0–1	0–2	3–1	0–3
Oswestry Town	0–2	1–1	3–1	1–1	1–2	1–2	5–0	2–1	1–3	0–1	1–3	2–1	1–2	4–1		2–0	2–1	5–2	0–1	0–2	2–1	5–3
Rhyl	1–1	1–1	2–2	0–2	3–2	0–0	2–1	3–0	1–3	2–2	3–1	1–0	0–0	1–1	3–1		3–1	0–5	2–3	1–2	0–1	0–1
South Liverpool	0–0	1–1	3–3	1–3	1–1	2–0	2–0	0–2	0–1	0–0	1–1	0–0	0–0	1–0	3–3	2–1		1–0	1–1	1–0	0–1	2–3
Southport	1–1	1–0	7–1	0–1	1–2	3–2	3–0	0–2	1–4	2–2	1–1	2–3	0–1	2–1	0–1	1–0	0–2		0–3	5–2	1–0	2–1
Stafford Rangers	4–1	0–2	5–1	2–0	2–2	1–0	6–2	1–1	3–0	0–1	2–1	3–1	4–0	1–0	7–0	1–1	3–2	0–2		0–1	1–0	0–0
Witton Albion	5–1	1–2	3–0	2–0	2–1	1–0	1–1	2–2	1–0	0–2	1–1	1–0	3–1	1–0	1–0	2–0	1–0	2–2	0–1		2–1	2–1
Workington	4–2	2–0	3–0	4–1	0–0	3–2	2–1	0–4	1–2	0–2	0–4	1–2	1–0	3–1	0–0	3–1	4–0	2–1	0–2	1–1		3–0
Worksop Town	2–1	1–0	1–0	4–1	1–1	1–2	2–0	4–4	2–0	0–1	1–0	2–1	2–2	2–1	1–1	1–2	5–0	1–0	1–0	0–2	1–1	

Updated to match(es) played on 4 May 1985. Source: Northern Premier Division results grid
Legend: Blue = home team win; Yellow = draw; Red = away team win.

== Cup Results ==
Challenge Cup:

- Marine bt. Goole Town

President's Cup:

- Rhyl 2–0 Macclesfield Town

Northern Premier League Shield: Between Champions of NPL Premier Division and Winners of the NPL Cup.

- Stafford Rangers bt. Marine

== End of the season ==
At the end of the seventeenth season of the Northern Premier League, Stafford Rangers applied to join the Alliance Premier League and were successful.

=== Promotion and relegation ===
The following two clubs left the League at the end of the season:

- Stafford Rangers promoted to Alliance Premier League
- Grantham relegated to Southern League Midland Division

The following two clubs joined the League the following season:

- Gateshead relegated from Alliance Premier League
- Caernarfon Town promoted from North West Counties League Division One
