= 1981–82 Alliance Premier League =

Alliance Premier League
- Season: 1981–82
- Champions: Runcorn (1st Alliance Premier League title)
- Promoted to the Football League: None
- Runners-up: Enfield
- Relegated to Level 6: Dartford, Gravesend & Northfleet, AP Leamington
- Promoted for the next season: Bangor City, Nuneaton, Wealdstone
- Matches: 462
- Goals: 1,269 (2.75 per match)
- Biggest home win: Bath City – AP Leamington 7–0
- Biggest away win: AP Leamington – Stafford Rangers 1–5; AP Leamington – Dagenham 0–4; Scarborough – Northwich Victoria 0–4
- Highest scoring: Barrow – Kettering Town 7–2; Enfield – Barrow 7–2; Altrincham – Worcester City 6–3; Kettering Town – Altrincham 5–4; Runcorn – Altrincham 5–4
- Longest winning run: ?
- Longest unbeaten run: ?
- Longest losing run: ?
- Highest attendance: ?
- Lowest attendance: ?
- Average attendance: ?

The Alliance Premier League season of 1981–82 was the third season of the Alliance Premier League.

== New teams in the league this season ==
- Dagenham (promoted 1980–81)
- Dartford (promoted 1980–81)
- Enfield (promoted 1980–81)
- Runcorn (promoted 1980–81)
- Trowbridge Town (promoted 1980–81)

== Final table ==
| Pos | Team | Pld | W | D | L | GF | GA | GD | Pts | Qualification or relegation |
|---|---|---|---|---|---|---|---|---|---|---|
| 1 | Runcorn (C) | 42 | 28 | 9 | 5 | 75 | 37 | +38 | 93 | |
| 2 | Enfield | 42 | 26 | 8 | 8 | 90 | 46 | +44 | 86 | |
| 3 | Telford United | 42 | 23 | 8 | 11 | 70 | 51 | +19 | 77 | |
| 4 | Worcester City | 42 | 21 | 8 | 13 | 70 | 60 | +10 | 71 | |
| 5 | Dagenham | 42 | 19 | 12 | 11 | 69 | 51 | +18 | 69 | |
| 6 | Northwich Victoria | 42 | 20 | 9 | 13 | 56 | 46 | +10 | 69 | |
| 7 | Scarborough | 42 | 19 | 11 | 12 | 65 | 52 | +13 | 68 | |
| 8 | Barrow | 42 | 18 | 11 | 13 | 59 | 50 | +9 | 65 | |
| 9 | Weymouth | 42 | 18 | 9 | 15 | 56 | 47 | +9 | 63 | |
| 10 | Boston United | 42 | 17 | 11 | 14 | 61 | 57 | +4 | 62 | |
| 11 | Altrincham | 42 | 14 | 13 | 15 | 66 | 56 | +10 | 55 | |
| 12 | Bath City | 42 | 15 | 10 | 17 | 50 | 57 | −7 | 55 | |
| 13 | Yeovil Town | 42 | 14 | 11 | 17 | 56 | 68 | −12 | 53 | |
| 14 | Stafford Rangers | 42 | 12 | 16 | 14 | 48 | 47 | +1 | 52 | |
| 15 | Frickley Athletic | 42 | 14 | 10 | 18 | 47 | 60 | −13 | 52 | |
| 16 | Maidstone United | 42 | 11 | 15 | 16 | 55 | 59 | −4 | 48 | |
| 17 | Trowbridge Town | 42 | 12 | 11 | 19 | 38 | 54 | −16 | 47 | |
| 18 | Barnet | 42 | 9 | 14 | 19 | 36 | 52 | −16 | 41 | |
| 19 | Kettering Town | 42 | 9 | 13 | 20 | 64 | 76 | −12 | 40 | |
| 20 | Gravesend & Northfleet (R) | 42 | 10 | 10 | 22 | 51 | 69 | −18 | 40 | Relegation to the Southern League Premier Division |
| 21 | Dartford (R) | 42 | 10 | 9 | 23 | 47 | 69 | −22 | 39 | Relegation to the Southern League Premier Division |
| 22 | AP Leamington (R) | 42 | 4 | 10 | 28 | 40 | 105 | −65 | 22 | Relegation to the Southern League Premier Division |

(C) Champions; (R) Relegated

== Results ==
| Home \ Away | ALT | APL | BAR | BRW | BAT | BOS | DAG | DAR | ENF | FRK | GRN | KET | MDS | NOR | RUN | SCA | STA | TEL | TRO | WEY | WRC | YEO |
|---|---|---|---|---|---|---|---|---|---|---|---|---|---|---|---|---|---|---|---|---|---|---|
| Altrincham | | 2–3 | 2–0 | 1–1 | 1–0 | 1–1 | 1–1 | 2–0 | 1–0 | 1–1 | 3–1 | 2–1 | 1–2 | 0–2 | 2–2 | 2–0 | 0–1 | 3–0 | 1–2 | 0–0 | 6–3 | 7–1 |
| AP Leamington | 0–1 | | 0–2 | 1–1 | 0–1 | 2–2 | 0–4 | 0–2 | 2–3 | 1–0 | 3–3 | 3–3 | 1–1 | 0–2 | 1–1 | 1–2 | 1–5 | 0–2 | 0–1 | 2–2 | 0–1 | 2–5 |
| Barnet | 0–0 | 0–0 | | 1–2 | 0–1 | 0–0 | 1–2 | 2–0 | 4–1 | 0–0 | 2–0 | 2–1 | 1–1 | 0–1 | 1–3 | 1–1 | 0–2 | 1–0 | 0–0 | 0–3 | 1–2 | 0–0 |
| Barrow | 1–0 | 4–2 | 2–1 | | 0–1 | 1–0 | 2–2 | 2–0 | 0–2 | 2–0 | 3–1 | 7–2 | 2–0 | 6–1 | 1–1 | 3–2 | 1–1 | 2–0 | 1–0 | 2–0 | 0–0 | 3–1 |
| Bath City | 1–1 | 7–0 | 2–1 | 0–0 | | 1–2 | 0–3 | 1–1 | 0–1 | 1–3 | 1–0 | 3–2 | 1–1 | 1–1 | 0–2 | 2–0 | 1–1 | 1–2 | 1–1 | 2–1 | 2–3 | 2–0 |
| Boston United | 1–1 | 2–0 | 1–1 | 2–1 | 4–0 | | 3–4 | 3–2 | 1–0 | 3–1 | 2–2 | 4–2 | 6–0 | 2–0 | 0–1 | 2–1 | 2–1 | 4–2 | 1–0 | 0–2 | 3–2 | 0–0 |
| Dagenham | 2–0 | 0–0 | 1–1 | 1–0 | 0–1 | 2–0 | | 2–1 | 2–4 | 2–0 | 1–1 | 2–1 | 1–1 | 2–1 | 0–1 | 2–2 | 2–2 | 3–2 | 1–2 | 2–1 | 1–2 | 3–0 |
| Dartford | 0–1 | 2–2 | 2–1 | 0–2 | 1–1 | 2–1 | 0–3 | | 0–2 | 1–0 | 0–1 | 2–2 | 2–1 | 0–1 | 1–2 | 0–1 | 2–2 | 2–0 | 1–0 | 0–0 | 0–2 | 5–0 |
| Enfield | 1–1 | 6–1 | 0–0 | 7–2 | 5–1 | 4–0 | 3–2 | 1–1 | | 3–0 | 4–0 | 1–1 | 3–2 | 1–0 | 2–0 | 1–4 | 2–0 | 3–4 | 2–1 | 3–0 | 1–2 | 2–0 |
| Frickley Athletic | 1–1 | 4–1 | 0–1 | 2–1 | 1–3 | 4–1 | 3–1 | 3–0 | 1–1 | | 1–1 | 3–2 | 0–3 | 1–0 | 2–0 | 2–3 | 2–0 | 0–0 | 2–0 | 0–1 | 1–2 | 2–1 |
| Gravesend & Northfleet | 1–1 | 4–1 | 2–3 | 3–1 | 0–2 | 3–1 | 1–2 | 1–0 | 1–2 | 4–1 | | 1–3 | 2–2 | 0–1 | 2–4 | 3–0 | 1–1 | 0–2 | 1–1 | 2–1 | 1–1 | 1–1 |
| Kettering Town | 5–4 | 1–2 | 5–2 | 0–2 | 1–3 | 1–1 | 3–1 | 4–4 | 0–1 | 0–0 | 2–1 | | 2–2 | 0–0 | 0–0 | 1–2 | 3–0 | 1–3 | 4–0 | 1–2 | 0–1 | 1–1 |
| Maidstone United | 0–0 | 4–0 | 0–0 | 1–0 | 1–0 | 0–2 | 2–2 | 5–1 | 1–4 | 0–0 | 0–1 | 2–0 | | 6–1 | 1–2 | 0–2 | 3–1 | 2–2 | 3–0 | 0–1 | 2–2 | 0–1 |
| Northwich Victoria | 2–0 | 3–0 | 1–1 | 2–0 | 2–1 | 1–0 | 3–0 | 3–4 | 2–1 | 0–0 | 1–0 | 2–0 | 3–1 | | 1–1 | 2–1 | 1–2 | 2–2 | 0–0 | 0–2 | 3–0 | 1–1 |
| Runcorn | 5–4 | 3–0 | 1–0 | 0–0 | 5–1 | 4–0 | 1–0 | 4–2 | 2–0 | 1–0 | 1–0 | 3–2 | 1–1 | 0–1 | | 2–0 | 1–0 | 2–3 | 2–0 | 3–1 | 5–2 | 2–1 |
| Scarborough | 1–3 | 6–1 | 1–0 | 2–0 | 1–1 | 1–1 | 1–1 | 2–0 | 1–4 | 0–1 | 5–0 | 1–0 | 0–0 | 0–4 | 3–0 | | 1–0 | 0–0 | 3–1 | 2–1 | 1–0 | 2–2 |
| Stafford Rangers | 2–0 | 3–1 | 1–0 | 1–1 | 2–0 | 0–0 | 0–0 | 0–3 | 0–1 | 0–0 | 1–0 | 1–1 | 1–1 | 2–2 | 0–1 | 1–1 | | 1–2 | 0–2 | 3–0 | 0–2 | 3–1 |
| Telford United | 4–3 | 2–0 | 3–0 | 0–0 | 0–2 | 4–1 | 0–2 | 2–0 | 0–0 | 7–1 | 1–0 | 1–0 | 1–2 | 2–1 | 1–1 | 1–1 | 0–3 | | 2–0 | 2–0 | 3–2 | 2–1 |
| Trowbridge Town | 0–2 | 2–1 | 1–1 | 2–0 | 1–1 | 1–0 | 0–1 | 2–1 | 2–2 | 2–0 | 2–1 | 0–1 | 3–0 | 1–0 | 0–0 | 1–3 | 1–1 | 1–2 | | 1–1 | 1–1 | 2–4 |
| Weymouth | 1–0 | 1–2 | 0–2 | 3–0 | 2–0 | 2–1 | 1–1 | 2–1 | 2–2 | 5–0 | 1–2 | 2–3 | 1–0 | 1–0 | 0–1 | 3–1 | 1–1 | 0–1 | 1–0 | | 3–2 | 1–1 |
| Worcester City | 4–3 | 2–1 | 3–1 | 4–0 | 2–0 | 0–0 | 2–1 | 2–0 | 1–2 | 3–2 | 2–1 | 1–1 | 4–1 | 0–1 | 0–1 | 2–4 | 1–1 | 2–1 | 3–1 | 0–0 | | 0–1 |
| Yeovil Town | 2–1 | 3–2 | 4–1 | 0–0 | 2–0 | 0–1 | 1–4 | 1–1 | 1–2 | 1–2 | 2–1 | 1–1 | 1–0 | 4–1 | 1–3 | 0–0 | 2–1 | 1–2 | 2–0 | 1–4 | 3–0 | |

Updated to match(es) played on unknown. Source: Rothmans Football Yearbook 1982–83. Queen Anne Press, Macdonald Futura Publishers, London & Sydney, 1982.
Legend: Blue = home team win; Yellow = draw; Red = away team win.
Locations of the Alliance Premier League teams 1981–1982
Locations of the Alliance Premier League 1981–1982 London teams

== Top scorers ==
| Rank | Player | Club | League | FA Cup | FA Trophy | League Cup | Total |
|---|---|---|---|---|---|---|---|
| 1 | (England) Williams | Scarborough | 27 | | | | |
| 2 | (England) David Mather | Telford United | 24 | | | | |
| 3 | (England) Aniello Iannone | Weymouth | 23 | | | | |
| 4 | (England) Nicky Ironton | Enfield | 20 | | | | |
| = | (England) Noel Ashford | Enfield | 19 | | | | |
| = | (England) Atkins | Barnet | 19 | | | | |
| = | (England) Burton | Dagenham | 19 | | | | |
| = | (England) Reid | Northwich Victoria | 19 | | | | |

== Promotion and relegation ==
=== Promoted ===
- Bangor City (from the Northern Premier League)
- Nuneaton (from the Southern Premier League)
- Wealdstone (from the Southern Premier League)

All of these teams had been relegated from the Alliance Premier League after the 1981–82 season.

=== Relegated ===
- Dartford (to the Southern Premier League)
- Gravesend & Northfleet (to the Southern Premier League)
- AP Leamington (to the Southern Premier League)

== Election to the Football League ==
This year Runcorn, the winners of the Alliance Premier League, could not apply for election because they did not meet Football League requirements. 2nd placed Enfield could not apply either for the same reasons, so 3rd placed Telford United won the right to apply for election to the Football League to replace one of the four bottom sides in the 1981–82 Football League Fourth Division. The vote went as follows:

| Club | Final Position | Votes |
|---|---|---|
| Northampton Town | 22nd (Fourth Division) | 53 |
| Crewe Alexandra | 24th (Fourth Division) | 50 |
| Rochdale | 21st (Fourth Division) | 48 |
| Scunthorpe United | 23rd (Fourth Division) | 48 |
| Telford United | 3rd (Alliance Premier League) | 13 |

As a result of this, Telford United did not gain membership of the Football League.
