= Ian Donaldson (disambiguation) =

Ian Donaldson is a Scottish singer.

The name Ian Donaldson may also refer to:

- Ian Donaldson (academic) (1935–2020), an Australian literary scholar
- Ian Donaldson (footballer), Scottish football goalkeeper
- Ian Stuart Donaldson (1957–1993), also known as Ian Stuart, English neo-Nazi musician
