= National League (division) =

English association football league

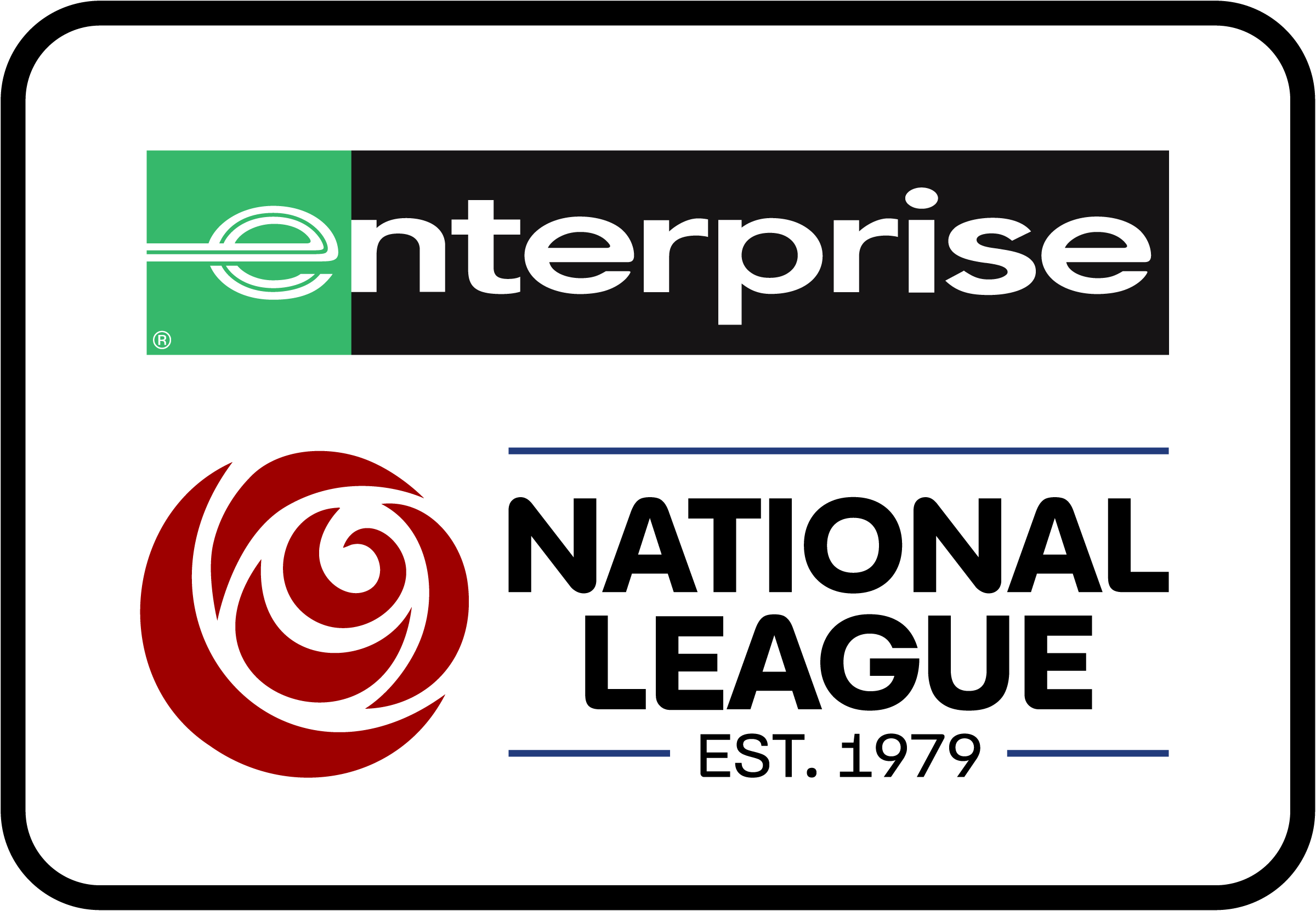
- Founded: 1979; 47 years ago (as Alliance Premier League)
- Country: England
- Chairman: Nic Coward
- Chief Executive Officer: Phil Alexander
- Number of clubs: 24
- Level on pyramid: 5 Step 1 (National League System)
- Promotion to: EFL League Two
- Relegation to: National League North; National League South
- Domestic cups: FA Cup; FA Trophy
- League cup: National League Cup
- International cup: UEFA Europa League (via FA Cup)
- Current champions: York City (1st title) (2025–26)
- Most championships: Barnet (4 titles)
- Broadcaster: DAZN
- Sponsor: Enterprise Rent-A-Car
- Website: thenationalleague.org.uk
- Current: 2026–27 National League

The National League is a professional association football league in England. The National League is the first division of the National Leagues and step 1 of the National League System and fifth-highest tier overall in the English football league system, after the Premier League and the EFL leagues, and is contested by 24 clubs. Through the National League, clubs get promoted to the EFL League Two, one of the divisions of the English Football League. Formerly the Conference National, the league was renamed the National League from the 2015–16 season.

Former English Football League clubs that currently compete in the National League include: Forest Green Rovers, Barrow, Carlisle United, Harrogate Town, Yeovil Town, Hartlepool United, Southend United, Scunthorpe United, Boston United, Sutton United, Kidderminster Harriers and Aldershot Town.

== History ==
The league was formed as the Alliance Premier League in 1979, coming into force for the 1979–80 season. The league drew its clubs from the Northern Premier League and the Southern League.

It greatly improved the quality of football at this lower level, as well as improving the financial status of the top clubs. This was reflected in 1986–87, when the Football League began accepting direct promotion and relegation between the Conference and the bottom division of the Football League, which at that time was known as the Football League Fourth Division and is now EFL League Two. The first team to be promoted by this method was Scarborough, and the first team relegated was Lincoln City, who regained their Football League status a year later as Conference champions.

Since 2002–03, the league has been granted a second promotion place, with a play off deciding who joins the champions in League Two. Previously, no promotion from the Conference would occur if the winners did not have adequate stadium facilities. If a club wins the division, but does not qualify for promotion, the next highest eligible club will be promoted in its place. If a club finishes in the play-off places but does not have an adequate stadium they will not be able to take part in the play-off competition. In that event such club shall not be replaced and the play-off structure and draw shall be adjusted as necessary by the National League Board on the basis of the remaining clubs' final league positions.

In 2004–05, the Conference increased its size by adding two lower divisions, the Conference North and Conference South respectively, with the original division being renamed Conference National. For the 2006–07 season, the Conference National expanded from 22 to 24 teams by promoting four teams while relegating two teams and introduced a "four up and four down" system between itself and the Conference North and Conference South.

== Trophy ==
The current National League trophy is designed and made by Thomas Lyte, the makers of FA Cup.

The trophy is made from silver plate with 24 carat gold plating and stands at 60cm tall. It was first handed to the winners of the competition at the end of the 2015/16 season and was created as part of a trio of trophies alongside the silverware handed to the winners of the National League South and North.

== Sponsorship ==
The league's first sponsor was Gola during the 1984–85 and 1985–86 seasons. When Gola's sponsorship ceased, carmaker Vauxhall Motors—then the British subsidiary of General Motors—took over and sponsored the league until the end of the 1997–98 season.

The 1998–99 Conference campaign began without sponsors for the Conference, but just before the end of the season a sponsorship was agreed with Nationwide Building Society. This lasted until the end of the 2006–07 season, after which Blue Square took over. This would also prompt the leagues being renamed, with the Conference National becoming the Blue Square Premier, the Conference North becoming Blue Square North and the Conference South becoming Blue Square South. In April 2010, Blue Square announced a further three-year sponsorship deal. From the start of the 2010–11 season the names were changed slightly, with "Blue Square" becoming "Blue Square Bet".

In July 2013 the Conference agreed another sponsorship deal with online payment firm Skrill. This lasted for only one year and the following July the Conference announced a brand-new three-year deal with Vanarama, later extended by two more years.

In 2015, the Football Conference was renamed the National League. The top division was also officially renamed the National League and the lower divisions renamed as National League North and National League South. In January 2019 the League signed a three-year deal with Motorama, Vanarama's sister company. It was extended to three more years in March 2021.

On 23 June 2025, vehicle rental company Enterprise Rent-A-Car paid to become the title sponsor of the National League.

Period	Sponsor	Name
1984–1986	Gola	Gola League
1986–1998	General Motors	GM Vauxhall Conference
1998–2007	Nationwide Building Society	Nationwide Conference
2007–2010	Blue Square	Blue Square Premier
2010–2013	Blue Square	Blue Square Bet Premier
2013–2014	Skrill	Skrill Premier
2014–2015	Vanarama	Vanarama Conference
2015–2025	Vanarama	Vanarama National League
2025–present	Enterprise Rent-A-Car	Enterprise National League

== Media coverage ==
Coverage of this league began in the mid-1990s when cable channels Wire TV, and later L!VE TV, broadcast weekly highlights and live matches. However, the closure of L!VE TV in 1999 saw coverage switch to Sky Sports. In August 2006, Setanta Sports signed a five-year deal with the Conference and Setanta Sports began showing live matches in the 2007–08 season, with 79 live games each season. Included in the deal were the annual play-off matches as well as the Conference League Cup, a cup competition for the three Football Conference divisions. Setanta showed two live matches a week, with one on Thursday evening and one at the weekend. In Australia the Conference National was broadcast by Setanta Sports Australia. Setanta Sports suffered financial problems and ceased broadcasting in the United Kingdom on 23 June 2009. Sky Sports broadcast the Conference play-off final 2010 at Wembley Stadium.

On 19 August 2010, Premier Sports announced that it bought the live and exclusive UK television rights to 30 matches per season from the Conference Premier for a total of three seasons. The 30 matches selected for broadcast included all five Conference Premier play-offs. The deal with the Football Conference was a revenue sharing arrangement whereby clubs received 50% of revenue from subscriptions, on top of the normal rights fee paid by the broadcaster, once the costs of production were met. The Conference also earned 50% from all internet revenue associated with the deal, which allowed them to retain advertising rights allied to those adverts shown with their matches. During the 2010–11 season, Premier Sports failed to attract enough viewers to its Conference football broadcasts to share any revenue with the clubs beyond the £5,000 broadcast fee paid to home clubs and £1,000 to away clubs.

In July 2013, BT Sport announced a two-year deal to broadcast 30 live games per season including all five play-off matches. In 2015 the National League announced that it renewed a three-year deal with BT Sport.

In December 2022, the National League announced a new streaming service, to stream all games that BT Sport was not showing, on a two week trial phase. National League TV would make a full launch on 26 December.

In July 2024, DAZN acquired the rights to stream the National League for 7 years, until 2031, to be broadcast in the UK and worldwide, limited only by the blackout rule on Saturday 3pm matches in the UK.

== Current membership ==
The following 24 clubs compete in the National League during the 2026–27 season.

=== Stadiums and locations ===
Locations of the 2026–27 National League clubs

Team	Location	Stadium	Capacity
AFC Fylde	Wesham	Mill Farm Sports Village	6,000
Aldershot Town	Aldershot	The Recreation Ground	7,100
Altrincham	Altrincham	Moss Lane	7,700
Barrow	Barrow-in-Furness	Holker Street	6,500
Boreham Wood	Borehamwood	Meadow Park	4,500
Boston United	Boston	Boston Community Stadium	5,061
Carlisle United	Carlisle	Brunton Park	17,949
Eastleigh	Eastleigh	Ten Acres	5,250
FC Halifax Town	Halifax	The Shay	10,400
Forest Green Rovers	Nailsworth	The New Lawn	5,147
Gateshead	Gateshead	Gateshead International Stadium	11,800
Harrogate Town	Harrogate	Wetherby Road	5,000
Hartlepool United	Hartlepool	Victoria Park	7,856
Hornchurch	London (Upminster)	Hornchurch Stadium	3,500
Kidderminster Harriers	Kidderminster	Aggborough Stadium	6,444
Scunthorpe United	Scunthorpe	Glanford Park	9,088
Solihull Moors	Solihull	Damson Park	5,500
Southend United	Southend-on-Sea	Roots Hall	12,392
Sutton United	London (Sutton)	Gander Green Lane	5,013
Tamworth	Tamworth	The Lamb Ground	4,565
Wealdstone	London (Ruislip)	Grosvenor Vale	4,085
Woking	Woking	Kingfield Stadium	6,036
Worthing	Worthing	Woodside Road	4,000
Yeovil Town	Yeovil	Huish Park	9,566

== Past winners ==
Numbers in parentheses indicate wins up to that date.

Season	Champions	Playoff winners
1979–80	Altrincham^{1}	No playoffs
1980–81	Altrincham^{1} (2)	No playoffs
1981–82	Runcorn^{1}	No playoffs
1982–83	Enfield^{1}	No playoffs
1983–84	Maidstone United^{1}	No playoffs
1984–85	Wealdstone^{1}	No playoffs
1985–86	Enfield^{1} (2)	No playoffs
1986–87	Scarborough	No playoffs
1987–88	Lincoln City	No playoffs
1988–89	Maidstone United (2)	No playoffs
1989–90	Darlington	No playoffs
1990–91	Barnet	No playoffs
1991–92	Colchester United	No playoffs
1992–93	Wycombe Wanderers	No playoffs
1993–94	Kidderminster Harriers^{2}	No playoffs
1994–95	Macclesfield Town^{2}	No playoffs
1995–96	Stevenage Borough^{2}	No playoffs
1996–97	Macclesfield Town (2)	No playoffs
1997–98	Halifax Town	No playoffs
1998–99	Cheltenham Town	No playoffs
1999–2000	Kidderminster Harriers (2)	No playoffs
2000–01	Rushden & Diamonds	No playoffs
2001–02	Boston United^{3}	No playoffs
2002–03	Yeovil Town	Doncaster Rovers
2003–04	Chester City	Shrewsbury Town
2004–05	Barnet (2)	Carlisle United
2005–06	Accrington Stanley	Hereford United
2006–07	Dagenham & Redbridge	Morecambe
2007–08	Aldershot Town	Exeter City
2008–09	Burton Albion	Torquay United
2009–10	Stevenage Borough (2)	Oxford United
2010–11	Crawley Town	AFC Wimbledon
2011–12	Fleetwood Town	York City
2012–13	Mansfield Town	Newport County
2013–14	Luton Town	Cambridge United
2014–15	Barnet (3)	Bristol Rovers
2015–16	Cheltenham Town (2)	Grimsby Town
2016–17	Lincoln City (2)	Forest Green Rovers
2017–18	Macclesfield Town (3)	Tranmere Rovers
2018–19	Leyton Orient	Salford City
2019–20^{4}	Barrow	Harrogate Town
2020–21	Sutton United	Hartlepool United
2021–22	Stockport County	Grimsby Town
2022–23	Wrexham	Notts County
2023–24	Chesterfield	Bromley
2024–25	Barnet (4)	Oldham Athletic
2025–26	York City	Rochdale

- ^1No promotion to the Football League until 1987.
- ^2No promotion due to the club's stadium not being adequate for the Football League.
- ^3Boston United were allowed to retain their championship title and subsequent promotion to the Football League despite having been found guilty of serious financial misconduct during their title winning season. Following their later relegation at the end of the 2006–07 season, due to entering into a Company Voluntary Arrangement and having restrictions placed on paying football creditors by HMRC, Boston were relegated a further division and placed in the Conference North.
- ^4Clubs voted to end the 2019–20 National League season using points per game after the season was suspended in March due to the COVID-19 pandemic.

== Play-off results ==
Season	Play-offs eliminator (Note: Play-offs eliminator round was first introduced for 2017–18 season)	First semi-final	Second semi-final	Final	Final venue
2002–03	N/A	Dagenham & Redbridge 2–1 Morecambe Morecambe 2–1 Dagenham & Redbridge; 2–2 draw on aggregate Dagenham won 3–2 on penalties	Doncaster Rovers 1–1 Chester City Chester City 1–1 Doncaster Rovers; 2–2 draw on aggregate Doncaster won 4–3 on penalties	Doncaster Rovers 3–2 Dagenham & Redbridge; Doncaster won with a golden goal (Match report)	Britannia Stadium, Stoke-on-Trent
2003–04	N/A	Aldershot Town 1–1 Hereford United Hereford United 0–0 Aldershot Town; 1–1 draw on aggregate Aldershot won 4–2 on penalties	Barnet 2–1 Shrewsbury Town Shrewsbury Town 1–0 Barnet; 2–2 draw on aggregate Shrewsbury won 5–3 on penalties	Aldershot Town 1–1 Shrewsbury Town; Shrewsbury won 3–0 on penalties (Match report)	Britannia Stadium, Stoke-on-Trent
2004–05	N/A	Aldershot Town 1–0 Carlisle United Carlisle United 2–1 Aldershot Town; 2–2 draw on aggregate Carlisle won 5–4 on penalties	Stevenage Borough 1–1 Hereford United Hereford United 0–1 Stevenage Borough Stevenage Borough won 2–1 on aggregate	Carlisle United 1–0 Stevenage Borough (Match report)	Britannia Stadium, Stoke-on-Trent
2005–06	N/A	Halifax Town 3–2 Grays Athletic Grays Athletic 2–2 Halifax Town Halifax Town won 5–4 on aggregate	Morecambe 1–1 Hereford United Hereford United 3–2 Morecambe Hereford United won 4–3 on aggregate	Hereford United 3–2 Halifax Town after extra time (Match report)	Walkers Stadium, Leicester
2006–07	N/A	Exeter City 0–1 Oxford United Oxford United 1–2 Exeter City; 2–2 draw on aggregate Exeter won 4–3 on penalties	York City 0–0 Morecambe Morecambe 2–1 York City Morecambe won 2–1 on aggregate	Morecambe 2–1 Exeter City (Match report)	Wembley Stadium, London
2007–08	N/A	Burton Albion 2–2 Cambridge United Cambridge United 2–1 Burton Albion Cambridge United won 4–3 on aggregate	Exeter City 1–2 Torquay United Torquay United 1–4 Exeter City Exeter City won 5–3 on aggregate	Cambridge United 0–1 Exeter City (Match report)	Wembley Stadium, London
2008–09	N/A	Stevenage Borough 3–1 Cambridge United Cambridge United 3–0 Stevenage Borough Cambridge United won 4–3 on aggregate	Torquay United 2–0 Histon Histon 1–0 Torquay United Torquay United won 2–1 on aggregate	Cambridge United 0–2 Torquay United (Match report)	Wembley Stadium, London
2009–10	N/A	Luton Town 0–1 York City York City 1–0 Luton Town York City won 2–0 on aggregate	Oxford United 2–0 Rushden & Diamonds Rushden & Diamonds 1–1 Oxford United Oxford United won 3–1 on aggregate	Oxford United 3–1 York City (Match report)	Wembley Stadium, London
2010–11	N/A	Fleetwood Town 0–2 AFC Wimbledon AFC Wimbledon 6–1 Fleetwood Town AFC Wimbledon won 8–1 on aggregate	Wrexham 0–3 Luton Town Luton Town 2–1 Wrexham Luton Town won 5–1 on aggregate	AFC Wimbledon 0–0 Luton Town; AFC Wimbledon won 4–3 on penalties (Match report)	City of Manchester Stadium, Manchester
2011–12	N/A	Luton Town 2–0 Wrexham Wrexham 2–1 Luton Town Luton Town won 3–2 on aggregate	York City 1–1 Mansfield Town Mansfield Town 0–1 York City York City won 2–1 on aggregate	Luton Town 1–2 York City (Match report)	Wembley Stadium, London
2012–13	N/A	Wrexham 2–1 Kidderminster Harriers Kidderminster Harriers 1–3 Wrexham Wrexham won 5–2 on aggregate	Grimsby Town 0–1 Newport County Newport County 1–0 Grimsby Town Newport County won 2–0 on aggregate	Wrexham 0–2 Newport County (Match report)	Wembley Stadium, London
2013–14	N/A	FC Halifax Town 1–0 Cambridge United Cambridge United 2–0 FC Halifax Town Cambridge United won 2–1 on aggregate	Grimsby Town 1–1 Gateshead Gateshead 3–1 Grimsby Town Gateshead won 4–2 on aggregate	Cambridge United 2–1 Gateshead (Match report)	Wembley Stadium, London
2014–15	N/A	Forest Green Rovers 0–1 Bristol Rovers Bristol Rovers 2–0 Forest Green Rovers Bristol Rovers won 3–0 on aggregate	Eastleigh 1–2 Grimsby Town Grimsby Town 3–0 Eastleigh Grimsby Town won 5–1 on aggregate	Bristol Rovers 1–1 Grimsby Town; Bristol Rovers won 5–3 on penalties (Match report)	Wembley Stadium, London
2015–16	N/A	Dover Athletic 0–1 Forest Green Rovers Forest Green Rovers 1–1 Dover Athletic Forest Green Rovers won 2–1 on aggregate	Grimsby Town 0–1 Braintree Town Braintree Town 0–2 Grimsby Town Grimsby Town won 2–1 on aggregate	Forest Green Rovers 1–3 Grimsby Town (Match report)	Wembley Stadium, London
2016–17	N/A	Aldershot Town 0–3 Tranmere Rovers Tranmere Rovers 2–2 Aldershot Town Tranmere Rovers won 5–2 on aggregate	Dagenham & Redbridge 1–1 Forest Green Rovers Forest Green Rovers 2–0 Dagenham & Redbridge Forest Green Rovers won 3–1 on aggregate	Tranmere Rovers 1–3 Forest Green Rovers (Match report)	Wembley Stadium, London
2017–18	Aldershot Town 1–1 Ebbsfleet United (Ebbsfleet United won 5–4 on penalties) Boreham Wood 2–1 AFC Fylde	Tranmere Rovers 4–2 (a.e.t) Ebbsfleet United	Sutton United 2–3 Boreham Wood	Tranmere Rovers 2–1 Boreham Wood (Match report)	Wembley Stadium, London
2018–19	AFC Fylde 3–1 Harrogate Town Wrexham 0–1 (a.e.t) Eastleigh	Solihull Moors 0–1 AFC Fylde	Eastleigh 1–1 Salford City; Salford City won 4–3 on penalties	AFC Fylde 0–3 Salford City (Match report)	Wembley Stadium, London
2019–20	Boreham Wood 2–1 FC Halifax Town Yeovil Town 0–2 Barnet	Harrogate Town 1–0 Boreham Wood	Notts County 2–0 Barnet	Harrogate Town 3–1 Notts County (Match report)	Wembley Stadium, London
2020–21	Notts County 3–2 Chesterfield Hartlepool United 3–2 Bromley	Torquay United 4–2 (a.e.t) Notts County	Stockport County 0–1 Hartlepool United	Torquay United 1–1 Hartlepool United Hartlepool United won 5–4 on penalties (Match report)	Ashton Gate Stadium, Bristol
2021–22	Notts County 1–2 (a.e.t) Grimsby Town FC Halifax Town 1–2 Chesterfield	Wrexham 4–5 (a.e.t) Grimsby Town	Solihull Moors 3–1 Chesterfield	Grimsby Town 2–1 (a.e.t) Solihull Moors (Match report)	London Stadium, London
2022–23	Barnet 1-2 Boreham Wood Woking 1–2 Bromley	Notts County 3–2 (a.e.t) Boreham Wood	Chesterfield 3–2 (a.e.t) Bromley	Notts County 2–2 Chesterfield Notts County won 4–3 on penalties (Match report)	Wembley Stadium, London
2023–24	Solihull Moors 4–2 FC Halifax Town Altrincham w/o ~~Gateshead~~ (Note: Altrincham were given a bye through the play-off eliminator following Gateshead's failure to meet the Football League's ground ownership requirements)	Barnet 0–4 Solihull Moors	Bromley 3-1 v Altrincham	Solihull Moors 2–2 Bromley Bromley won 4–3 on penalties (Match report)	Wembley Stadium, London
2024–25	Oldham Athletic 4–0 FC Halifax Town Rochdale 3–4 (a.e.t) Southend United	York City 0–3 Oldham Athletic	Forest Green Rovers 2–2 Southend United; Southend United won 4–2 on penalties	Oldham Athletic 3–2 (a.e.t) Southend United (Match report)	Wembley Stadium, London
2025–26	Scunthorpe United 1–0 Southend United Boreham Wood 1–0 (a.e.t) Forest Green Rovers	Rochdale 2–1 Scunthorpe United	Carlisle United 1–2 (a.e.t) Boreham Wood	Rochdale FC 2–2 Boreham Wood Rochdale won 3–1 on penalties (Match report)	Wembley Stadium, London

== Attendances ==
The highest average league attendance was in the 2022–23 season, when 1.7 million fans attended National League matches, at an average of 3,378 per game. The lowest average league attendance came in the 2014–15 season, when 1 million spectators watched at an average of 1,853 per game. The highest seasonal average for a club was 9,973 for Wrexham in the 2022–23 season.

Season	League average attendance	Highest average	
Season	League average attendance	Club	Attendance
2010–11	2,146	Unknown	
2011–12	2,034	Unknown	
2012–13	1,885	Luton Town	5,882
2013–14	1,864	Luton Town	7,387
2014–15	1,853	Bristol Rovers	8,402
2015–16	1,901	Tranmere Rovers	5,229
2016–17	1,872	Tranmere Rovers	5,741
2017–18	2,045	Tranmere Rovers	5,293
2018–19	1,971	Leyton Orient	5,444
2019–20	1,971	Notts County	5,210
2020–21	No attendances due to pandemic		
2021–22	3,084	Wrexham	8,692
2022–23	3,378	Wrexham	9,973
2023–24	2,774	Chesterfield	7,893
2024–25	2,568	Southend United	7,339
2025–26	2,807	Southend United	8,103

== Records ==
Most wins in a season	34	Wrexham (2022–23)
Fewest defeats in a season	3	Yeovil Town (2002–03); Crawley Town (2010–11); Notts County & Wrexham (2022–23)
Most consecutive wins	12	Burton Albion (2008–09); Mansfield Town (2012–13)
Longest unbeaten run in a season	30	Crawley Town (2010–11)
Most points in a season	111	Wrexham (2022–23)
Fewest points in a season	1	Dover Athletic (2021–22) (Note: Dover Athletic accumulated thirteen points across the 2021–22 season however they started the season with a 12-point deduction due to failure to complete fixtures the previous season. The previous record lowest points tally accumulated was 10 points by Hyde United in the 2013–14 season.)
Smallest points gap between champions and 2nd place	0	Colchester United (1991-92) (94 points) over Wycombe Wanderers by +9 goal difference
Largest points gap between champions and 2nd place	19	Luton Town (2013–14) (101 points) over Cambridge United (82 points)
Most goals in a season	117	Notts County (2022-23)
Fewest goals conceded in a season	24	Kettering Town (1993–94); Stevenage Borough (2009–10)
Highest goal difference	75	Notts County (2022–23)
Biggest win	9–0	Runcorn beat Enfield (3 March 1990); Sutton United beat Gateshead (22 September 1990); Hereford United beat Dagenham & Redbridge (27 February 2004); Rushden & Diamonds beat Weymouth (21 February 2009); Tranmere Rovers beat Solihull Moors (8 April 2017)
Record attendance (play-offs)	52,115	Oldham Athletic vs Southend United at Wembley Stadium (play-off final, 1 June 2025)
Record attendance (league game)	16,511	Notts County vs Yeovil Town at Meadow Lane (19 November 2022)
Record transfer fee	£1.5 million	Abdul Abdulmalik, from Boreham Wood to Djurgårdens IF (30 August 2026)

== See also ==
- National League North
- National League South
