= Trevor Finnigan =

English footballer and manager

Personal information
- Full name: Thomas Trevor Finnigan
- Date of birth: 14 October 1952 (age 74)
- Place of birth: Bedlington, Northumberland, England
- Height: 6 ft 2 in (1.88 m)
- Positions: Forward; midfielder

Senior career*
Years	Team	Apps	(Gls)
1969–1972	Everton		
1973-1974	New Brighton		
1975–1977	Runcorn		
1977–1978	Blackpool	17	(3)
1978–1979	Bournemouth	25	(5)
1979–1980	Yeovil Town	36	(9)
1980–1983	Weymouth	101	(25)
1983–1984	Yeovil Town	41	(7)

International career
1981	England Semi-Pro	2	(0)

Managerial career
- 1983–1984: Yeovil Town (player-manager)
- * Club domestic league appearances and goals

Thomas Trevor Finnigan (born 14 October 1952) is an English former professional footballer who played as a forward for Everton, Blackpool and Bournemouth. At the age of just fourteen he made a pretty spectacular entrance to the professional game when he was signed for Port Vale by no less a person than the legendary Stanley Matthews. At the age of 17 he was offered a trial at Harry Catterick's Everton, he had the trial on a Monday then played for Everton's under 18 side the following night and was signed as a full time professional on the Wednesday. Released from Everton in 1972 he spent two years at New Brighton before moving to Runcorn and enjoyed a very successful period with the club which saw them win the Northern Premier League Challenge Cup and League Championship in 1975-76. His form for Runcorn in the 1975-76 season once again attracted the attention of a number of League clubs for during the 75/76 season he scored a total of 54 goals. In 1977 Blackpool stepped in with a fee of £4,000 and took Finnigan to Bloomfield Road playing in the old Second Division. In 1978 he signed for AFC Bournemouth and scored within the first five minutes of his debut with the club, Finnigan signed for Yeovil Town in 1979 for a fee of £2,000 after a season with Yeovil he moved to their local rivals Weymouth for a fee of £5,000, before returning to Yeovil as player-manager in 1983.

In 1981, while with Weymouth, Finnigan was twice capped by the England semi-professional side, playing in a 2–0 defeat of Holland and 0–0 draw with Scotland, both of these matches being staged in Italy.
