= Gola (brand) =

English sporting goods company (f.1905)

- Company type: Private
- Genre: Sports equipment
- Founded: Leicester, England
- Headquarters: Rawtenstall, England
- Area served: Worldwide, except Central, Eastern Europe, Middle East & Africa
- Products: Accessories; Footwear
- Parent: Jacobson Group
- Website: gola.co.uk

Gola is a sporting goods brand based in England. It was founded on 22 May 1905. It used to be known as the Bozeat Boot Company, and was based in the Northamptonshire village of Bozeat.

== Overview ==
The company produces mainly track suits and trainers, of which the models known as "Harrier" and "Chase" are particularly popular, especially in continental Europe. During the 1970s, Gola's licensing was held under Electronic Rentals Group and its principal chairman, Maurice Fry and Leisure Group Managing Director Alan Christopher Cowell who also ran Camping Gaz. ERG PLC pushed several million pounds into Gola and developed the Gola Bag of 1972 which created an international craze.

Gola was purchased by the Jacobson Group in 1996 and has since expanded its range. In the early 2000s, Gola sportswear was re-launched in the UK as a 'retro' sports fashion brand, selling to the same people, now grown up, who fondly remembered the brand from their childhood – but at premium prices.

Gola sponsored the Alliance Premier League, the highest level of English non-League football, from 1984 until 1986, during which time the league was known as the Gola League.

In January 2026, it was announced that Gola, as part of its parent company Jacobson Group, had been acquired by Marubeni Consumer Platform US, a subsidiary of Marubeni Corporation, for an undisclosed sum. Following the transaction, Gola became part of Marubeni’s US-based consumer platform, while continuing to operate within Jacobson Group’s existing brand portfolio and management structure.
