= Paul Moss (footballer) =

English footballer

Personal information
- Full name: Paul Michael Moss
- Date of birth: 2 August 1957 (age 69)
- Place of birth: Birmingham, England
- Height: 1.75 m (5 ft 9 in)
- Position: Midfielder

Senior career*
Years	Team	Apps	(Gls)
1978–1979	Wolverhampton Wanderers	0	(0)
1979–1981	Hull City	54	(7)
1981–1982	Scunthorpe United	42	(7)
1982–1985	Worcester City	213	(105)
- * Club domestic league appearances and goals

Paul Michael Moss (born 2 August 1957) is an English former professional footballer who played as a midfielder in the Football League.
