= Mike Doherty (footballer) =

English footballer

Personal information
- Full name: Michael Doherty
- Date of birth: 8 March 1961 (age 65)
- Place of birth: Liverpool, England
- Position: Forward

Senior career*
Years	Team	Apps	(Gls)
1982	Basingstoke Town	?	(?)
1982–1983	Reading	25	(5)
1983	Slough Town	?	(?)
1983–1984	Yeovil Town	36	(17)
1984	Wycombe Wanderers	9	(0)
1984–1987	Weymouth	102	(54)
1987–1988	Maidstone United	25	(6)
1988–1989	Yeovil Town	?	(11)
1989–1990	Runcorn	36	(18)
1990–1992	Farnborough Town	?	(?)
1992–1993	Macclesfield Town	35	(6)
1993–1994	Altrincham	9	(1)
- * Club domestic league appearances and goals

Michael Doherty (born 8 March 1961) is an English former professional footballer who played in the Football League, as a forward.
