= Ian Donaldson (footballer) =

Scottish footballer

Personal information
- Full name: Ian Donaldson
- Place of birth: Scotland
- Position: Goalkeeper

Youth career
- Giffock North

Senior career*
Years	Team	Apps	(Gls)
1960–1964	Queen's Park	37	(0)

International career
1963	Scotland Amateurs	1	(0)
- * Club domestic league appearances and goals

Ian Donaldson was a Scottish amateur football goalkeeper who played in the Scottish League for Queen's Park. He was capped by Scotland at amateur level.
