= History of the English non-League football system =

The history of the English non-League football system encompasses the history of non-League football in England. The non-League football system describes the hierarchical system of interconnected leagues for men's association football clubs that sits below the English Football League. Currently, The Football Association administers the top six levels of the English non-League football system. It has named this the National League System (NLS). The NLS spans six levels of the overall English football league system, and consists of around 48 divisions in total.

Although many of the leagues within the National League System have been around for a long time, the System itself is a fairly recent development. It was created by The Football Association in the 1990s to bring together various ad hoc arrangements from around the country, and to give clubs a clear path of promotion and relegation from the lower levels of the pyramid right through to the professional leagues.

== Before 1951 ==
Tier:	1921-1959: League:	
3	Football League Third Division	
4	Southern League West	Southern League East

In the late nineteenth century a number of different football leagues were developed. Of these, only the Football League and the Football Alliance had national and professional pretensions. The Football Alliance was merged into the Football League in 1892, creating a two-tier competition. Both of these divisions were strongly weighted towards the North and the Midlands, since Southern County Football Associations were opposed to professionalism. Nonetheless, in 1894, the Southern League was formed, of both professional and amateur teams. It was considered to rival the Football League in quality and its strength was demonstrated by providing the only non-league FA Cup winner, Tottenham Hotspur in 1901, and by attracting a northern side in Bradford Park Avenue to join in 1907.

As the Football League expanded further since its merger with the Football Alliance, it admitted clubs from a variety of leagues. The Midland League, founded in 1889, provided most of the additional clubs until the First World War, in addition to the Southern League. Other leagues which provided teams promoted to the League included:

- The Lancashire League (merged with The Lancashire Combination in 1903)
- The Combination (centred around Cheshire, Staffordshire and North Wales; folded in 1911)
- The Central League (From 1911)
- The Birmingham & District League
- The Northern Alliance

The Northern League (1889) barred professional clubs in 1906 and remained strictly amateur until 1974. It rarely provided new entrants to the Football League unless its constituent clubs wished to turn professional.

This was mirrored by the Isthmian League (1905), covering London and the South-East. Despite their relative lack of impact on the Football League, they dominated the FA Amateur Cup, collecting the trophy 50 times between them from 1894 to 1974.

This remaining group of regional amateur and semi-professional leagues formed a patchwork across England and Wales, collectively known as "non-League football". Non-League in this sense referred to outside the national, professional Football League, rather than without a league. There was relatively little movement between leagues, although ambitious clubs could apply for membership of a stronger competition, often to replace a club that had folded.

=== Creation of the Third Division ===
In 1920, the top division of the Southern League was merged into the Football League to form the Third Division, establishing the Southern League as a feeder to the Football League and ending claims to their parity. The following season a further division, consisting of teams from a series of northern leagues, formed the Third Division North, with the existing league renamed the Third Division South accordingly.

Many predominant non-League leagues contained a mixture of Football League reserve teams as well as smaller clubs. The Central League became composed entirely of reserve teams after the foundation of the Third Division North encompassed all six of its remaining first teams.

== 1951–79: Southern League and Northern Premier League ==
=== Election to the Football League ===
Clubs in the strongest leagues could apply to join the Football League by standing in an annual election. The bottom four teams in the League's lowest division were also obliged to stand in the election, and the existing League members would vote on the four teams from all those applying.

Typically, around 10–15 non-League teams applied each year, but most of them gained only a handful of votes, and between 1951 and 1979, only seven non-league clubs won election to the League at the expense of an existing League club, in addition to the four clubs which benefited from the expansion of the Football League in 1950. The teams that were promoted to the League were:

- 1950: Shrewsbury Town (Midland League), Scunthorpe & Lindsey United (Midland League), Colchester United (Southern League), Gillingham (Southern League) were elected to expand the Football League from 88 to 92 teams.
- 1951: Workington (North Eastern League) replaced New Brighton
- 1960: Peterborough United (Midland League) replaced Gateshead
- 1962: Oxford United (as Headington United) (Southern League) elected to fill the vacancy left by Accrington Stanley's resignation
- 1970: Cambridge United (Southern League) replaced Bradford Park Avenue
- 1972: Hereford United (Southern League) replaced Barrow
- 1977: Wimbledon (Southern League) replaced Workington
- 1978: Wigan Athletic (Northern Premier League) replaced Southport

=== 1951–68: Southern League ===
The Southern League provided many of the subsequently promoted teams along with the Midland League.

No clear northern equivalent to the Southern League was established, although the Lancashire Combination, the Cheshire League (successor to The Combination, established 1919) and the Northern Alliance League occasionally provided successful applicants until the establishment of the Northern Premier League.

The Birmingham & District League's last Football League application was made in 1958, and its top teams started to promote to an expanded Southern League. Although this was not a formal system of promotion and relegation, its top teams continued to join the Southern League or the Midland League.

There was still an absence of a unified northern equivalent to the Southern League and, in-part due to this, there was the first of often chaotic reorganisations of the non-league game.

The Lancashire Combination and The Combination (Cheshire League) remained largely unaffected by the chaos of reorganisations. The Northern Alliance was not as lucky and folded, being replaced by the North-Eastern League in 1964.

=== 1968–79: NPL ===
Tier:	1959–1979: League:					
4	Football League Fourth Division					
5	Northern Premier League				Southern League; Premier Division	
6	Cheshire League	Midland League	Northern Alliance	Lancashire Combination	Southern League; 1st Division North	Southern League; 1st Division South

Amateur Leagues
Isthmian League; Premier Division	Northern League
Isthmian League; 1st Division	–
Isthmian League; 2nd Division	–

In 1968, the Northern Premier League was formed by the strongest clubs from the north of England outside the Football League, and after 1968, all League applicants came from either the Southern League or the Northern Premier League. The Northern League and the Isthmian League (1905), remained the strongest amateur leagues.

The Northern Premier League drew teams mainly from the Lancashire Combination, Cheshire League and Midland League, and these leagues were demoted in status below the Northern Premier League, along with the Northern Alliance.

==== Mixing of professional and amateur clubs ====
By 1974, The Football Association had stopped distinguishing between professionals and amateurs.

The Isthmian League went on a slow process of professionalisation, though even in the early 1980s many of its clubs remained amateur.

== 1979–82: APL ==
Tier:	Division:		
4	Football League Fourth Division		
5	Alliance Premier League		
6	Northern Premier League	Southern League; Midland Division	Southern League; Southern Division

The Northern League remained staunchly amateur and was eclipsed by the Northern Premier League; it refused to enter the National League System until 1991, when many of its teams had defected to other leagues and it was forced to accept feeder status to the Northern Premier League, having previously refused feeder status to the Alliance Premier League.

=== Alliance Premier League ===
In 1979, the Alliance Premier League was formed by a group of leading Southern League and Northern Premier League clubs. The Southern and Northern Premier Leagues became "feeder" leagues to the APL, with automatic promotion and relegation between them. The Isthmian League, while it was now becoming recognised as one of the strongest semi-professional leagues, remained outside the fledgling "pyramid" until 1985. The Southern League also restructured, reducing itself from three divisions to two (running in parallel) to compensate for the loss of many of its Premier Division clubs to the new league.

One of the reasons for the creation of the APL was so that there would be a single club each year that could apply for Football League status, so as not to split the favourable votes between several clubs, as had happened in many previous years. Some years even saw the applicants receive more votes combined than any of the clubs up for re-election (including every year between 1973 and 1976). However, the League was still reluctant to increase its turnover of clubs, and none of the early APL champions succeeded in gaining election.

== 1982–2004: Feeding ==
Southern League feeders

- West Midlands (Regional) League: 13 clubs (to 1994)
- Midland Combination: 10 clubs (to 1994)
- Midland Alliance: 7 clubs (from 1995)
- United Counties League: 8 clubs
- Eastern Counties League: 5 clubs
- Hellenic League: 11 clubs
- Western League: 8 clubs
- Wessex League: 7 clubs
- Sussex County League: 4 clubs
- Kent League: 9 clubs
- Spartan League: 2 clubs
- Athenian League: 1 club
- Northern Counties (East) League: 1 club (Shepshed Charterhouse)

The Midland Alliance was formed in 1994 by clubs from the West Midlands (Regional) League and the Midland Combination. The latter two became feeder leagues to the Alliance along with the Leicestershire Senior League. The Alliance and Combination later merged in 2014 to create the Midland Football League.

The Wessex League was formed in 1986 by clubs from the Hampshire League and from some neighbouring counties; it superseded the Hampshire League as a direct feeder for the Southern League.

Isthmian League feeders

- Essex Senior League: 10 clubs
- Spartan League: 6 clubs (to 1997)
- South Midlands League: 1 club (to 1997)
- Spartan South Midlands League: 2 clubs (from 1998)
- Combined Counties League: 7 clubs
- United Counties League: 1 club (Stevenage Borough, 1984)
- Hampshire League: 1 club
- Eastern Counties League: 1 club
- Athenian League: 17 clubs (mostly in 1984 IL expansion; see below)

The Spartan South Midlands League was formed in 1998 by a merger of the Spartan League and the South Midlands League.

Northern Premier League feeders

- North West Counties League: 35 clubs (including 1987 NPL expansion)
- Northern Counties (East) League: 18 clubs (including 1987 NPL expansion)
- Northern League: 5 clubs (from 1991)

A rationalisation of feeder leagues in the north of England took place in 1982. The Northern League remained untouched, but the Yorkshire League and the Midland League amalgamated to form the Northern Counties (East) League, while to the west of the Pennines, the Cheshire County League and the Lancashire Combination joined forces to become the North West Counties League. Both these leagues became feeders for the Northern Premier League, but without automatic promotion and relegation – clubs still had to apply to join the higher league.

=== 1982–84 ===
In 1982, the Southern League reinstated its Premier Division, absorbing 13 clubs from various smaller regional leagues. From this season onwards, the exchange of clubs between the regional leagues and the "big three" feeder leagues increased considerably, with around 8 clubs each season being promoted to the Southern, Northern Premier or Isthmian Leagues, and around 5 being relegated (the balance being made up of clubs folding or merging).

Football League Fourth Division
Alliance Premier League
Northern Premier League	Southern League; Premier Division		Isthmian League; Premier Division
–	SL; Midland Division	SL; Southern Division	IL; 1st Division
–	–	–	IL; 2nd D

=== 1984–87 ===
Football League Fourth Division
Alliance Premier League
Northern Premier League	Southern League; Premier Division		Isthmian League; Premier Division	
-	SL; Midland Division	SL; Southern Division	IL; 1st Division	
–	–	–	IL; 2nd D North	IL; 2nd D South

In 1984, the Isthmian League absorbed the Athenian League, forming two parallel Second Divisions, and in 1985, it was accepted as a third feeder to the APL (although two Isthmian clubs, Dagenham and Enfield, had joined the APL in 1981). Each year, the champions of the APL's three feeder leagues would be promoted to the APL and the three lowest-ranking teams would be relegated down. The Southern League and Isthmian League's footprints overlapped considerably, with both having members throughout the south east of England, but despite occasional transfers between the two leagues, there was no concerted effort to fix their common boundary, and clubs in the South East were more or less free to choose which league to play in. In particular Yeovil Town, who had been a long-standing Southern League member until they became founder members of the APL, played in the Isthmian League from 1985 to 1988, and again from 1995 to 1997, despite being based 100 miles from any of their opponents.

=== 1987–91: Football Conference League ===
Football League Fourth Division
Football Conference
Northern Premier League; Premier Division	Southern League; Premier Division		Isthmian League; Premier Division	
NPL; 1st Division	SL; Midland Division	SL; Southern Division	IL; 1st Division	
–	–	–	IL; 2nd D North	IL; 2nd D South

From 1987, the Conference champions were finally granted automatic promotion to the Football League. Over the next few years, the clubs relegated from the League were typically able to rebound straight away, with Lincoln City, Darlington and Colchester United all gaining promotion in one or two seasons. (although Newport County, relegated in 1988, went bankrupt partway through their first Conference season).

Also in 1987, the Northern Premier League created a new First Division, with its existing clubs forming the Premier Division. Automatic promotion and relegation was then instigated with its feeder leagues.

Scarborough were the first Conference club to win promotion to the Football League, when they finished as Conference champions at the end of the 1986–87 season.

=== 1991–2002 ===
Football League Third Division
Football Conference
Northern Premier League; Premier Division	Southern League; Premier Division		Isthmian League; Premier Division
NPL; 1st Division	SL; Midland Division	SL; Southern Division	IL; 1st Division
–	–	–	IL; 2nd D
–	–	–	IL; 3rd D

In 1992, the Football League Fourth Division changed its name to the Third Division following the creation of the Premier League and the transfer to it of all the clubs of the First Division. The Isthmian League de-regionalised its second division to create new Second and Third Divisions.

=== 2002–04: Play-offs ===
Football League Third Division
Football Conference
Northern Premier League; Premier Division	Southern League; Premier Division		Isthmian League; Premier Division	
NPL; 1st D	SL; D1 West	SL; D1 East	IL; 1st D North	IL; 1st D South
			IL; 2nd D	

In 2003, play-offs were introduced for clubs finishing 2nd–5th in the Conference, allowing two clubs to go up to the Football League for the first time. A year previously, the Isthmian League reorganised Division One into North and South regions and disbanded Division Three.

== 2004–2015: Expansion and steps ==
=== 2004–06: Three Conference League Divisions ===
	Football League Two			
Step 1	Conference National			
Step 2	Conference North		Conference South	
Step 3	Northern Premier League; Premier Division	Southern League; Premier Division		Isthmian League; Premier Division
Step 4	NPL; 1st D	SL; D1 West	SL; D1 East	IL; 1st D
Step 5	Isthmian League Second Division and 14 other feeder leagues			

In 2004, the Football League renamed Football League Division Three to Football League Two as part of a rebranding exercise.

A new level was added immediately below the Football Conference, consisting of two divisions, Conference North and Conference South. The clubs for these new divisions were drawn equally from the three feeder leagues. The existing Conference division at Step 1 was renamed Conference National.

As part of the restructuring, the Isthmian League's two First Divisions were merged, and the boundary between the Southern League and the Isthmian League was redrawn, with 12 clubs transferring from the Southern to the Isthmian, and 27 moving in the opposite direction. To make up the numbers at Step 4, no clubs were relegated and a total of 20 clubs were promoted from the Step 5 feeder leagues.

=== 2006–07: Three Isthmian League Divisions ===
	Football League Two				
Step 1	Conference National				
Step 2	Conference North		Conference South		
Step 3	Northern Premier League; Premier Division	Southern League; Premier Division		Isthmian League; Premier Division	
Step 4	NPL; 1st D	SL; D1 Midlands	SL; D1 South & West	IL; 1st D North	IL; 1st D South
Step 5	14 feeder leagues				

For the 2006–07 season, the Isthmian League First Division was split back out into North and South sections again to reduce travel costs, in the wake of Hastings United's complaints over these costs in 1998, causing them to drop out of the Southern league when their application to transfer to the Isthmian was denied. The Southern League Division Ones were also rearranged slightly, and renamed as Midlands and South & West. Plans to split the Northern Premier League First Division in the same way were put on hold due to a lack of suitable clubs.

Each of the divisions at Steps 2–4 had a quota of 22 clubs, although the Northern Premier League First Division ran with 24 clubs for this season as part of the future expansion plans. The Conference National was expanded to 24 clubs, the same as the Football League's three divisions.

A total of 30 clubs were promoted from Step 5 to Step 4, including 4 from the Isthmian League Second Division. The division was then disbanded, with its remaining clubs distributed across the other Step 5 leagues in the South East. It was planned to reduce the number of divisions at that level from 15 to 12, but there was no consensus on how this should be achieved, so 2006–07 ran with fourteen Step 5 divisions, each with between 18 and 22 clubs.

It was hoped that the restructuring would improve the lower levels of the system in a number of ways. There would be less travelling for the Level 8 clubs as there would be five divisions, not four. This became of particular benefit to Midlands-based clubs who predominantly competed in the Southern League Division One Midlands, rather than being split between the geographically larger, older divisions. There should also be less overlapping at Level 9.

Lower down the pyramid, the Liverpool County Combination merged with the I Zingari League to form the Liverpool County Premier League, while the Somerset County League split its lower levels from Division Two and Division Three to Division Two East and Division Two West. The East Cornwall Premier League changed its name to the East Cornwall League, divided into two divisions (Premier Division and Division One). In a purely cosmetic change, the Bedford & District League became the Bedfordshire League.

=== 2007–09: Three NPL Divisions ===
	Football League Two					
Step 1	Conference Premier					
Step 2	Conference North			Conference South		
Step 3	Northern Premier League; Premier Division		Southern League; Premier Division		Isthmian League; Premier Division	
Step 4	NPL; D1 North	NPL; D1 South	SL; D1 Midlands	SL; D1 South & West	IL; 1st D North	IL; 1st D South
Step 5	14 feeder leagues					

For the 2007–08 season, the Conference National was renamed Conference Premier and the Northern Premier League Division One was split into two, completing the plan of six divisions at Step 4. They were split along a north–south basis. Because each division only had 18 clubs initially, they played an unusual format, with each division being split into East and West sections. Each club played all the others in its division home and away, and also played all the others in its section a third time, either home or away. This gave each club 42 games (rather than the 34 they would have with just a straight round-robin). The extra games are spread across the season. Further down, the South Western League and the Devon County League merged to form the South West Peninsula League. It has a Premier Division at Step 6, and Division One East and Division One West at Step 7. The new league fed directly into the Premier Division of the Western League, in parallel with the Western League Division One. It was hoped that the new division would encourage more clubs from the West Country to move up the pyramid, without having to jump directly from local Cornwall and West Devon leagues to the Western League (which can mean journeys of over 200 miles each way). Further down still, Step 7's Wessex League Division Two was disbanded and its clubs returned to local leagues, including the new Hampshire Premier Football League, which would run alongside the now-defunct Hampshire League.

On 16 May 2008, the FA Leagues Committee added the East Midlands Counties League at Step 6, taking clubs from the Central Midlands League and the Leicestershire Senior League (both at Step 7 at the time). It was to run parallel to the Northern Counties League Division One, which was re-centred on Yorkshire, with both feeding into the Northern Counties League Premier Division. Both the Central Midlands League and the Leicestershire Senior League retained their current formats and their current Step 7 status for their highest divisions. The possible addition of Surrey Elite Intermediate League at Step 7 was also announced. This included some of the best clubs from the existing Intermediate leagues in the county, some clubs dropping down from the Combined Counties League Division One, and some teams from areas adjacent to the county boundary. The FA refused to give this new league the expected Step 7 status but pledged to keep the matter under review. The Hampshire Premier League was also officially named as a Step 7 league from 2008.

=== 2009–15 ===
	Football League Two					
Step 1	Conference Premier					
Step 2	Conference North			Conference South		
Step 3	Northern Premier League; Premier Division		Southern League; Premier Division		Isthmian League; Premier Division	
Step 4	NPL; D1 North	NPL; D1 South	SL; D1 Central	SL; D1 South & West	IL; 1st Division North	IL; 1st Division South
Step 5	14 feeder leagues					

Step 5 by area each League Covered. Sussex County changed its name to Southern Combination for the 2015–16 season.

In 2009, Southern League Division One Midlands was renamed Division One Central.

For the 2011–12 season, the Kent Invicta Football League was created at Step 6 to bridge the gap between the Kent League at Step 5 and the Kent County League at Step 7. The FA hoped to reduce the number of Step 5 leagues to twelve by the 2013–14 season, with the number of clubs in each league being gradually reduced to 22 through adjustments to the number of relegation places. This change never materialised.

A series of changes were introduced for the 2013–14 season to ensure that each Step 5 league had the opportunity to promote a team to Step 4. Since there were 14 Step 5 leagues and 6 Step 4 leagues, a simple promotion/relegation system would not work. All three Step 3 leagues (Northern Premier League Premier, Southern Premier, Isthmian Premier) were expanded from 22 to 24 teams. The two Isthmian leagues at Step 4 (Division One North, Division One South) were expanded from 22 to 24 teams and the number of relegated sides in both divisions increased from two to three. The remaining four Step 4 leagues would still each have 22 teams and two relegation spots. The Isthmian League was chosen for expansion due to the greater number of clubs competing in its geographical area at Step 5 and to ensure there were 14 relegation places at Step 4, in line with the 14 Step 5 divisions. At Step 5, teams finishing as low as third at Step 5 could be promoted, as long as they applied for promotion and met the ground grading criteria, but only one team from each Step 5 division could be promoted each season, the highest placed eligible club. For changes for the 2013–14 season to take place, a "16-up, 6-down" system applied for the 2012–13 season only, whereby 16 teams from Step 5 were promoted (rather than 14) and only six teams from Step 4 were relegated (rather than 12).

In 2013, the Kent League was renamed Southern Counties East League, while the Midland Alliance and Midland Combination merged to become the new Midland League at Step 5.

== 2015 onwards: National League ==
=== 2015–18: National League ===
	English Football League Two					
Step 1	National League					
Step 2	National League North			National League South		
Step 3	Northern Premier League; Premier; Division		Southern League; Premier Division		Isthmian League; Premier Division	
Step 4	NPL; D1; North	NPL; D1; South	SL; D1; East	SL; D1; West	IL; 1st D North	IL; 1st D South
Step 5	14 feeder leagues					

In 2015, the Football Conference and its divisions were renamed the National League, and a year later the Southern Counties East League absorbed the Kent Invicta League to become the former's second division, still at Step 6. In 2017, the Southern League reverted its First Divisions to East and West.

=== 2018–21: Four Step 3 and seven Step 4 Leagues ===
	English Football League Two						
Step 1	National League						
Step 2	National League North				National League South		
Step 3	Northern Premier League; Premier Division		Southern League; Central Division		Southern League; South Division		Isthmian League; Premier Division
Step 4	NPL; D1 West	NPL; D1 East	SL; D1; Central	SL; D1; South	IL; North; Division	IL; South Central Division	IL; South East Division
Step 5	14 feeder leagues						
Step 6	20 feeder leagues						

In May 2017, the FA chose the Southern League to create one additional division at Step 3 and the Isthmian League to create one at Step 4 as part of the next change to the structure, and in March 2018, the Northern Premier League voted to reorganise its Step 4 divisions into an east–west alignment, with all Step 3 divisions contracting to 22 clubs and those at Step 4 to 20, taking effect in the 2018–19 season. Step 7 was eliminated ahead of the 2020–21 season and leagues at that step were redesignated as regional NLS feeders, handled by county associations.

=== 2021 onwards: Eight at Step 4 ===
	English Football League Two							
Step 1	National League							
Step 2	National League North				National League South			
Step 3	Northern Premier League; Premier Division		Southern League; Central Division		Southern League; South Division		Isthmian League; Premier Division	
Step 4	NPL; D1 East	NPL; D1 West	NPL; D1 Midlands	SL; D1; Central	SL; D1; South	IL; South Central; Division	IL; North Division	IL; South East Division
Step 5	16 feeder leagues							
Step 6	17 feeder leagues							

For 2020–21, the FA intended to add one more division at Step 4 and two more at Step 5 for a 'perfect' 1-2-4-8-16 divisional model. On 17 April 2019, it was clarified that there would be 17 divisions at Step 6, down from 19 in 2018–19 and that the two new divisions at Step 5 would be in the Midlands and the west London/Thames Valley areas. On 24 April, it was announced that the Northern Premier League had been awarded the operation of the eighth division at Step 4. After the declaration of a coronavirus pandemic which later reached England, the remainder of the 2019–20 season for leagues at Steps 3 to 6 was cancelled on 26 March 2020 and as a consequence, there were no promotions or relegations, necessitating the affected leagues to restart by next season. The FA decided to move the implementation of NLS restructures to the 2021–22 season. Again, leagues from Step 2 below had their 2020–21 seasons curtailed by restrictions from COVID-19 lockdowns on 24 February 2021. In April 2021, the FA Alliance and Leagues committees recommended the implementation of the aforementioned changes and it was reported that the two new Step 5 divisions would be administered by the Combined Counties and United Counties leagues.

In the 2024–25 season, all Step 4 divisions expanded to 22 clubs in each of them, reflecting a long-term FA aim to 'create consistency' at each step of the NLS pyramid.

== See also ==
- List of association football competitions

== Sources ==
- Football Club History Database
- Tony Kempster's site
- A critical view of NLS restructuring (archived)
