= Mark Graves =

English footballer

Personal information
- Full name: Mark Terence Graves
- Date of birth: 14 December 1960 (age 65)
- Place of birth: Isleworth, England
- Position: Forward

Senior career*
Years	Team	Apps	(Gls)
1977–1982	Plymouth Argyle	34	(3)
1982–1987	Wealdstone	191	(89)
- * Club domestic league appearances and goals

Mark Terence Graves (born 14 December 1960) is an English former professional footballer who played in the Football League, as a forward.
