= Frank Murphy (footballer, born 1959) =

Scottish footballer

Personal information
- Full name: Francis Murphy
- Date of birth: 1 June 1959 (age 67)
- Place of birth: Glasgow, Scotland
- Position: Midfielder

Senior career*
Years	Team	Apps	(Gls)
1979–1981	Desborough Town		
1981–1984	Kettering Town	104	(49)
1984–1987	Nuneaton Borough	114	(51)
1987–1988	Kettering Town	40	(16)
1988–1992	Barnet	85	(32)
1991–1992	→ Slough Town (loan)	4	(1)
1992–1993	Kettering Town	10	(6)
- Corby Town
	Cray Wanderers	11	(8)
1993–1994	Dulwich Hamlet		
1997–2001	Hendon	8	(0)
Total		365	(155)

Managerial career
- 1994–1997: Dulwich Hamlet
- 1997–2001: Hendon
- 2001: Carshalton Athletic
- * Club domestic league appearances and goals

Francis Murphy (born 1 June 1959) is a Scottish former professional footballer who played in the Football League as a midfielder.
