= National League (English football) =

Football league in England

- Founded: 1979; 47 years ago (as Alliance Premier League); 2004; 22 years ago (North & South)
- Country: England
- Other club from: Wales
- Divisions: National League; National League North; National League South
- Number of clubs: 72
- Level on pyramid: Levels 5–6
- Promotion to: English Football League
- Relegation to: Northern Premier League; Isthmian League; Southern Football League
- Domestic cup(s): FA Cup; FA Trophy
- League cup: National League Cup
- Current champions: York City (National League); AFC Fylde (North); Worthing (South) (2025–26)
- Broadcaster: DAZN
- Website: thenationalleague.org.uk
- Current: 2026–27 National League

The National League is a professional football league in England that consists of 72 teams, divided equally between the National League (division), National League North and National League South. The National League is one of the major professional sports leagues in England and is the highest tier of Non-League football in England.

It was called the "Alliance Premier League" from 1979 until 1986. Between 1986 and 2015, the league was known as the "Football Conference".

All of the National League (division) clubs are fully professional, while a growing number of National League North and National League South clubs are also professional. Some professional clubs were previously in the English Football League (EFL), as opposed to clubs that have always been non-League. The National League is the lowest of the five nationwide professional football divisions in England, below the Premier League and the three divisions of the EFL, and is the top tier of the National League System of non-League football. The National League North and National League South form the sixth tier of professional English football. The National League consisted of only one division until 2004, but expanded as part of an extensive restructuring of the National League System beginning with the 2004–05 season. DAZN has broadcast it in Germany, France and the UK.

== Organisation ==
The National League stands at the top of the National League System (NLS), a comprehensive structure linking together over 50 different leagues under the auspices of The Football Association (FA). The National League is at Step 1 of the NLS, and National League North and National League South make up Step 2. Above the National League are the 92 clubs that together make up the highest levels of English football, the Premier League and the EFL; below the National League are the Step 3 and lower leagues of the NLS.

The National League has 24 clubs and the North and South divisions have 24 clubs each. Each club plays the others in its division twice during a season, once at home and once away. Clubs earn three points for a win, one for a draw, and none for a defeat.

At the end of each season two clubs are promoted from the National League to EFL League Two and two teams from League Two are relegated to the National League to take their place. The two promotion places are awarded to the National League champions and to the winners of the National League Promotion Final, which is played between the two teams who were successful in playoff games, contested by those clubs finishing second to seventh in the final divisional standings.

At the other end of the table, the bottom four clubs in National League are relegated to either National League North or National League South. The decision as to which division the relegated club joins is made by the FA's NLS Committee, but is largely determined by geography. The four relegated teams are replaced by four promoted teams, two from National League North and two from National League South. For each of these two leagues, this is the champions and the winners of their respective Promotion Finals between their second to seventh place clubs in those divisions.

At the bottom of National League North and National League South, four clubs from each division are relegated and these eight clubs are divided among the Step 3 leagues of the NLS: the Northern Premier League; the Southern League (with two divisions, Central and South); and the Isthmian League. Each of these Step 3 leagues promotes their respective champions and second- to fifth-place playoff winners. The NLS Committee determines which Step 3 leagues the relegated clubs join, and whether the promoted clubs join National League North or National League South.

Clubs relegated from the national division are not always geographically balanced. Thus, should it be deemed necessary, the NLS Committee may order one or more clubs from northern counties bordering the south and vice versa or from South Wales in the sixth tier to switch divisions (to move "horizontally" between the leagues, so to speak) so as to maintain numerical balance between North and South.

Due to financial constraints at this level of football, some clubs have escaped relegation despite finishing in a relegation position, due to the misfortune of others. For promotion to proceed, whether from the National League to the EFL, within the National League, or between the various leagues of the NLS, certain conditions concerning finances and facilities must be met. Failure to meet the requirements of the league concerned prevents the eligible club from being promoted.

The National League North and South expanded to 24 teams each in the 2022–23 season. Expansion was scheduled at first for 2020–21 until its implementation was postponed because of the COVID-19 pandemic in England. It was fulfilled at the end of 2021–22.

== History ==
The National League was formed in 1979 from leading teams in the Northern Premier League and Southern League and was known originally as the Alliance Premier Football League and from 1986–87 as the Football Conference. Support for such a league came from Alan Hardaker, the long serving Secretary of the Football League. He suggested that an amalgamation of the two strongest lower leagues in England, the Northern Premier League and the Southern League, would reduce the number of candidates applying to join the Football League under the re-election system then in use. It was also thought it would enable the strongest non-league candidate to emerge. In 1977 the Northern Premier and Southern Leagues agreed to only put forward one candidate each for election to the League and this proved successful with Wimbledon and Wigan Athletic gaining election to the League in 1977 and 1978. It was then agreed that a new league would be set up comprising 13 Southern League teams and 7 sides from the Northern Premier.

The founder members were:

- AP Leamington
- Altrincham
- Bangor City
- Barnet
- Barrow
- Bath City
- Boston United
- Gravesend & Northfleet
- Kettering Town
- Maidstone United
- Northwich Victoria
- Nuneaton Borough
- Redditch United
- Scarborough
- Stafford Rangers
- Telford United
- Wealdstone
- Weymouth
- Worcester City
- Yeovil Town

Several Northern Premier sides who might have taken part in the new competition did not do so. Goole Town, Lancaster City, and Mossley all did not apply to enter the Alliance. Matlock Town and Runcorn were not admitted as their grounds did not meet the criteria required for the new league. Southport, who had been voted out of the Football League in 1978, were accepted as members of the new league, but eventually chose not to join it due to concerns over travelling costs.

Barrow and Northwich had previously been members of the EFL. Barrow failed re-election in 1972, while Northwich resigned from the league in 1894. Barnet, Boston, Maidstone, Scarborough and Yeovil have also tasted EFL football since the formation of the National League, but are now back in the National League or its feeder leagues (Scarborough and Maidstone now in new incarnations).

Of the 20 founder members, the last to leave the fifth level were Northwich. They were relegated in 2005, a year after the demise of Telford. Barnet are the only founder member who have remained in the top five levels continuously since 1979.

Former League logo

Bangor City have since moved to the Welsh football league system, while AP Leamington, Maidstone, Nuneaton, Scarborough, and Telford later collapsed and were reconstituted in lower English leagues. Gravesend & Northfleet changed its name to Ebbsfleet United in 2007.

The National League had a single division for the first 25 years of its existence, but since the 2004–05 season has consisted of three divisions. The original division was renamed Conference National (currently National League) and two new regional divisions one level down were introduced, Conference North and Conference South (currently National League North and South). The new clubs to form this larger competition were drawn from the Northern Premier League, Southern League, and Isthmian League according to guidelines developed by the NLS Committee.

Barnet are the only club to have won the National League four times (1991, 2005, 2015, 2025). Macclesfield Town have won it three times (1995, 1997, 2018). Five clubs have become champions twice: Altrincham (1980, 1981), Enfield (1983, 1986), Kidderminster Harriers (1994, 2000), Maidstone United, (1984, 1989), and Stevenage Borough (1996, 2010). Kidderminster also finished second in 1997 and 2013. Lincoln City became the seventh club to win the National League twice (1988, 2017), but subsequent to Barnet's third title. Only Barnet were promoted to the EFL on all three occasions; Maidstone's first title came before the era of automatic promotion, while Kidderminster Harriers, Macclesfield Town and Stevenage Borough were denied promotion because their grounds were not up to the required standard at the time of their first win. However, all three were promoted when they took their second title. Altrincham are the only team in history to retain the title, as at the time there was no automatic promotion to the EFL.

One former National League club has reached the Premier League, although six such clubs did compete in the top tier of football prior to the Premier League, in the Football League First Division: Carlisle United, Leyton Orient, Oxford United, Luton Town, Grimsby Town, and Notts County. All of them have since returned to the EFL, Luton and Orient by winning the title, and the other four by winning the playoff finals. Bradford (Park Avenue) also played in the First Division in its previous incarnation, however their current incarnation has only reached as high as the National League North division.

The highest league tier a club promoted from the National League has reached is the top flight Premier League, which (as of May 2023) has been reached by one club, Luton Town.

Conversely, Oldham Athletic became the first former Premier League side to compete in the National League and by extension, any non-League competition, following a home defeat by Salford City, in 2022.

=== Promotion and relegation ===
Prior to 1987, for National League clubs to enter the EFL, they had to be elected by League members. As a consequence, there was no guarantee that winning the National League would result in promotion, and none of the league's first seven champions were promoted. This changed in 1987, when automatic promotion and relegation between the Football League Fourth Division and the National League was agreed. The first clubs affected by the new system were Lincoln City, who were relegated and replaced by Scarborough. However, although the champions of the National League are entitled to a place in the EFL, this was dependent on their stadium meeting the set criteria for membership. This meant that Northampton Town, Exeter City, and Torquay United all avoided relegation from the EFL from 1994 to 1996, although Exeter and Torquay were both relegated to the National League at a later date.

For three successive years in the 1990s, the National League champions were denied promotion to the EFL on these grounds. Since 1997, when Macclesfield Town won the title for the second time in three years, every champion has been promoted.

Since 2003, the National League has been awarded a second promotion place. Through 2017, this was decided by a play-off system similar to that of the EFL. The four teams below the National League champions played against each other in semi-finals over two legs, with second playing fifth and third playing fourth. The winners of these ties then played a single final game known as the Promotion Final, with the winners gaining the second promotion place. Doncaster Rovers were the first team to win the Promotion Final.

Prior to 2004, relegation from the National League meant dropping to one of the three feeder leagues below. After Chester City failed to avoid expulsion in 2010, three teams were relegated instead of four, to either the Northern Premier League, Southern League or Isthmian League, based on geographical criteria. In turn, the champions of these three leagues would be promoted to the National League. The closure of Chester City during the later stages of the 2009–10 season was the first mid-season closure of a club in the division since Newport County in the second half of the 1988–89 season; on both occasions, the records of both clubs were expunged.

In 2004, a restructuring of the National League System saw the creation of a new level immediately below the National League; two regional divisions now named National League North and National League South were created, with the feeder leagues dropping below them. There are two promotion places to the National League's top division from each regional division – the champions are promoted automatically, while the remaining place is again decided by semi-final play-offs and a promotion final. The four teams relegated from the National League (i.e. the highest division) are then allocated to one or other of the regional divisions dependent on their geographical location.

In May 2017, the National League proposed a revamp in the play-offs for all three divisions. Under the new system, the number of teams playing for promotion was increased to six. The clubs finishing second and third automatically proceed to a semi-final at their home grounds, while the clubs in fourth and fifth stage compete in qualifying round ties against the teams finishing seventh and sixth. The winners of those matches then complete the semi-finals. These proposals were approved at the National League's annual general meeting on 10 June.

In 2019, plans were discussed for the gradual restructuring of the NLS so that the North and South divisions were expected to expand to 24 teams each in 2021–22. Due to the COVID-19 pandemic in England, the 2020–21 National League North and South seasons were curtailed and voided after written resolutions were put to a vote. No teams were relegated. Expansion was therefore delayed and it was implemented before the 2022–23 season with eight-team relegations from tier six at the end of that season. To expand, two clubs in Step 2 were relegated and eight promoted from all four Step 3 divisions: the division champions and play-off winners. Four teams in both North and South are relegated starting in 2023.

== Current members ==
Locations of the 2025–26 National League clubs by division
– National League. – National League North. – National League South.

=== National League ===
- Aldershot Town
- Altrincham
- Boreham Wood
- Boston United
- Brackley Town
- Braintree Town
- Carlisle United
- Eastleigh
- FC Halifax Town
- Forest Green Rovers
- Gateshead
- Hartlepool United
- Morecambe
- Rochdale
- Scunthorpe United
- Solihull Moors
- Southend United
- Sutton United
- Tamworth
- Truro City
- Wealdstone
- Woking
- Yeovil Town
- York City

=== National League North ===
- AFC Fylde
- AFC Telford United
- Alfreton Town
- Bedford Town
- Buxton
- Chester
- Chorley
- Curzon Ashton
- Darlington
- Hereford
- Kidderminster Harriers
- King's Lynn Town
- Leamington
- Macclesfield
- Marine
- (Wales) Merthyr Town
- Oxford City
- Peterborough Sports
- Radcliffe
- Scarborough Athletic
- South Shields
- Southport
- Spennymoor Town
- Worksop Town

=== National League South ===
- AFC Totton
- Bath City
- Chelmsford City
- Chesham United
- Chippenham Town
- Dagenham & Redbridge
- Dorking Wanderers
- Dover Athletic
- Eastbourne Borough
- Ebbsfleet United
- Enfield Town
- Farnborough
- Hampton & Richmond Borough
- Hemel Hempstead Town
- Hornchurch
- Horsham
- Maidenhead United
- Maidstone United
- Salisbury
- Slough Town
- Tonbridge Angels
- Torquay United
- Weston-super-Mare
- Worthing

== Former National League clubs now in the EFL ==
Club	Years in the National League	Number of seasons	Lowest tier competed in	Current Division
Accrington Stanley	2003–2006	3	8th	League Two
AFC Wimbledon	2008–2011	3	9th	League One
Barnet	1979–1991; 2001–2005; 2013–2015; 2018–2025	25	8th	League Two
Bristol Rovers	2014–2015	1	5th	League Two
Bromley	2015–2024	9	8th	League One
Burton Albion	2002–2009	7	7th	League One
Cambridge United	2005–2014	9	5th	League One
Cheltenham Town	1985–1992; 1997–1999; 2015–2016	10	7th	League Two
Chesterfield	2018–2024	6	5th	League Two
Colchester United	1990–1992	2	5th	League Two
Crawley Town	2004–2011	7	7th	League Two
Doncaster Rovers	1998–2003	5	5th	League One
Exeter City	2003–2008	5	5th	League Two
Fleetwood Town	2008–2012	4	9th	League Two
Grimsby Town	2010–2016; 2021–2022	7	5th	League Two
Leyton Orient	2017–2019	2	5th	League One
Lincoln City	1987–1988; 2011–2017	7	5th	Championship
Luton Town	2009–2014	5	5th	League One
Mansfield Town	2008–2013	5	5th	League One
Newport County	1988–1989; 2004–2013	10	9th	League Two
Notts County	2019–2023	4	5th	League One
Oldham Athletic	2022–2025	3	5th	League Two
Oxford United	2006–2010	4	5th	League One
Rochdale	2023–2026	3	5th	League Two
Salford City	2016–2019	3	10th	League Two
Shrewsbury Town	2003–2004	1	5th	League Two
Stevenage	1994–2010	16	10th	League One
Stockport County	2011–2022	11	6th	League One
Tranmere Rovers	2015–2018	3	5th	League Two
Wrexham	2008–2023	15	5th	Championship
Wycombe Wanderers	1985–1986; 1987–1993	7	5th	League One
York City	2004–2012; 2016–2026	18	6th	League Two

== Former EFL and Premier League clubs now in the National League ==
Phoenix or reformed clubs are not included unless they competed in the League in their own right, and are counted separately from the original club. Highest English Football League tier is the tier's standing within the EFL and may not correspond to its overall standing on today's system.

Club	Years in the EFL	Number of seasons	Highest tier competed in	Current Division
Aldershot Town	2008–2013	5	4th	National League
Barrow	1921–1972; 2020–2026	57	3rd	National League
Boston United	2002–2007	5	4th	National League
Carlisle United	1928–2004; 2005–2025	96	1st	National League
Dagenham & Redbridge	2007–2016	9	3rd	National League South
Forest Green Rovers	2017–2024	7	3rd	National League
Harrogate Town	2020–2026	6	4th	National League
Hartlepool United	1921–2017; 2021–2023	91	3rd	National League
Kidderminster Harriers	2000–2005	5	4th	National League
Morecambe	2007–2025	18	3rd	National League North
Scunthorpe United	1950–2022	72	2nd	National League
Southend United	1920–2021	94	2nd	National League
Southport	1921–1978	50	3rd	National League North
Sutton United	2021–2024	3	4th	National League
Torquay United	1927–2007; 2009–2014	78	3rd	National League
Yeovil Town	2003–2019	16	2nd	National League

=== Phoenix clubs ===
Several clubs, formed as phoenix clubs after the dissolution of former EFL clubs, have competed in the National League. These include:

- AFC Telford United (founded in 2004 following the winding-up of Telford United in 2004)
- Aldershot Town (founded in 1992 following the winding-up of Aldershot in 1992)
- Bradford (Park Avenue) (founded in 1987 following the winding-up of the original Bradford (Park Avenue) in 1974)
- Chester (founded in 2010 following the winding-up of Chester City in 2010)
- Darlington (founded in 2012 following the winding-up of the original Darlington in 2012)
- FC Halifax Town (founded in 2008 following the winding-up of Halifax Town in 2008)
- Gateshead (founded in 1977 following the winding-up of Gateshead in 1973)
- Hereford (founded in 2014 following the winding up of Hereford United in 2014)
- Maidstone United (founded in 1992 following the winding-up of Maidstone United in 1992)
- Scarborough Athletic (founded in 2007 following the winding-up of Scarborough in 2007)
- Macclesfield F.C. (formed in 2020 following the winding-up of Macclesfield Town in 2020)

== Past National League winners ==
Season	National League champions	Promotion Final winners
1979–80	Altrincham**	
1980–81	Altrincham** (2)	
1981–82	Runcorn**	
1982–83	Enfield**	
1983–84	Maidstone United**	
1984–85	Wealdstone**	
1985–86	Enfield** (2)	
1986–87	Scarborough*	
1987–88	Lincoln City*	
1988–89	Maidstone United* (2)	
1989–90	Darlington*	
1990–91	Barnet*	
1991–92	Colchester United*	
1992–93	Wycombe Wanderers*	
1993–94	Kidderminster Harriers**	
1994–95	Macclesfield Town**	
1995–96	Stevenage Borough**	
1996–97	Macclesfield Town* (2)	
1997–98	Halifax Town*	
1998–99	Cheltenham Town*	
1999–2000	Kidderminster Harriers* (2)	
2000–01	Rushden & Diamonds*	
2001–02	Boston United*	
2002–03	Yeovil Town*	Doncaster Rovers* (match report)
2003–04	Chester City*	Shrewsbury Town* (match report)
2004–05	Barnet* (2)	Carlisle United* (match report)
2005–06	Accrington Stanley*	Hereford United* (match report)
2006–07	Dagenham & Redbridge*	Morecambe* (match report)
2007–08	Aldershot Town*	Exeter City* (match report)
2008–09	Burton Albion*	Torquay United* (match report)
2009–10	Stevenage Borough* (2)	Oxford United* (match report)
2010–11	Crawley Town*	AFC Wimbledon* (match report)
2011–12	Fleetwood Town*	York City* (match report)
2012–13	Mansfield Town*	Newport County* (match report)
2013–14	Luton Town*	Cambridge United* (match report)
2014–15	Barnet* (3)	Bristol Rovers* (match report)
2015–16	Cheltenham Town* (2)	Grimsby Town* (match report)
2016–17	Lincoln City* (2)	Forest Green Rovers* (match report)
2017–18	Macclesfield Town* (3)	Tranmere Rovers* (match report)
2018–19	Leyton Orient*	Salford City* (match report)
2019–20	Barrow*	Harrogate Town* (match report)
2020–21	Sutton United*	Hartlepool United* (match report)
2021–22	Stockport County*	Grimsby Town* (match report)
2022–23	Wrexham*	Notts County* (match report)
2023–24	Chesterfield*	Bromley* (match report)
2024–25	Barnet* (4)	Oldham* (match report)
2025-26	York City*	Rochdale A.F.C.*

* Promoted to the EFL (Fourth Division until 1992, Third Division from 1992 until 2004 and League Two from 2004)
** Not promoted

Season	National League North champions	Promotion Final winners
2004–05	Southport	Altrincham
2005–06	Northwich Victoria	Stafford Rangers
2006–07	Droylsden	Farsley Celtic
2007–08	Kettering Town	Barrow
2008–09	Tamworth	Gateshead
2009–10	Southport (2)	Fleetwood Town
2010–11	Alfreton Town	AFC Telford United
2011–12	Hyde	Nuneaton Town
2012–13	Chester	FC Halifax Town
2013–14	AFC Telford United	Altrincham
2014–15	Barrow	Guiseley
2015–16	Solihull Moors	North Ferriby United
2016–17	AFC Fylde	FC Halifax Town
2017–18	Salford City	Harrogate Town
2018–19	Stockport County	Chorley
2019–20	King's Lynn Town	Altrincham
2020–21	None, season curtailed and voided due to COVID-19 pandemic	
2021–22	Gateshead	York City
2022–23	AFC Fylde (2)	Kidderminster Harriers
2023–24	Tamworth	Boston United
2024–25	Brackley Town	Scunthorpe United
2025-26	AFC Fylde (3)	Kidderminster Harriers

Season	National League South champions	Promotion Final winners
2004–05	Grays Athletic	Eastbourne Borough **
2005–06	Weymouth	St Albans City
2006–07	Histon	Salisbury City
2007–08	Lewes	Eastbourne Borough
2008–09	AFC Wimbledon	Hayes & Yeading United
2009–10	Newport County	Bath City
2010–11	Braintree Town	Ebbsfleet United
2011–12	Woking	Dartford
2012–13	Welling United	Salisbury City
2013–14	Eastleigh	Dover Athletic
2014–15	Bromley	Boreham Wood
2015–16	Sutton United	Maidstone United
2016–17	Maidenhead United	Ebbsfleet United
2017–18	Havant & Waterlooville	Braintree Town
2018–19	Torquay United	Woking
2019–20	Wealdstone	Weymouth
2020–21	None, season curtailed and voided due to COVID-19 pandemic	
2021–22	Maidstone United	Dorking Wanderers
2022–23	Ebbsfleet United	Oxford City
2023–24	Yeovil Town	Braintree Town
2024–25	Truro City	Boreham Wood
2025-26	Worthing	Hornchurch

** Not promoted. In 2004–05 only three promotion places were available to the Conference Premier. The third place was decided in a Promotion Final at Stoke City's Britannia Stadium, which Eastbourne Borough lost 2–1 to the Conference North Playoff winners, Altrincham.

== League Cup ==
The Alliance Premier/Conference organised a cup competition from 1979 until 2009, with occasional breaks when sponsors were not available. Known initially as the Bob Lord Challenge Trophy until 2000–01, the cup competition was reinstated in 2004–05 as the Conference League Cup for one season, before returning again in 2007–08 as the Setanta Shield, sponsored by Setanta Sports. Very much like the EFL Cup and EFL Trophy at the higher levels, it has not always proved popular with fans and was generally viewed as of secondary importance to the FA Trophy. The cup was put in abeyance when Setanta Sports' British service ceased.

In the 2024–25 season, the competition was revived as the 32-team National League Cup, with 16 National League clubs and 16 under-21 teams from Premier League 2.

=== Winners ===
Season	Winners	Runners-up
1979–80	Northwich Victoria	Altrincham
1980–81	Altrincham	Kettering Town
1981–82	Weymouth	Enfield
1982–83	Runcorn	Scarborough
1983–84	Scarborough	Barnet
1984–85	Runcorn	Maidstone United
1985–86	Stafford Rangers	Barnet
1986–87	Kettering Town	Hendon
1987–88	Horwich RMI	Weymouth
1988–89	Yeovil Town	Kidderminster Harriers
1989–90	Yeading	Stamford
1990–91	Sutton United	Barrow
1991–92	Wycombe Wanderers	Runcorn
1992–93	Northwich Victoria	Wycombe Wanderers
1993–94	Macclesfield Town	Yeovil Town
1994–95	Bromsgrove Rovers	Kettering Town
1995–96	Bromsgrove Rovers	Macclesfield Town
1996–97	Kidderminster Harriers	Macclesfield Town
1997–98	Morecambe	Woking
1998–99	Doncaster Rovers	Farnborough Town
1999–2000	Doncaster Rovers	Kingstonian
2000–01	Chester City	Kingstonian
2001–02 to 2003–04	not held	
2004–05	Woking	Stalybridge Celtic
2005–06 to 2006–07	not held	
2007–08	Aldershot Town	Rushden & Diamonds
2008–09	AFC Telford United	Forest Green Rovers
2009–10 to 2023–24	not held	
2024–25	Leeds United U21	Sutton United
2025–26	Boreham Wood	West Ham United U21

== Sponsorship ==
Since 1984, the National League has been publicly known by the names of a succession of official title sponsors. The name was officially changed from Alliance Premier to the Football Conference in 1986, and to the National League in 2015. Below is a list of sponsors and what they chose to call the league.

Period	Sponsor	Name
1984–1986	Gola	Gola League
1986–1998	General Motors	GM Vauxhall Conference
1998–2004	Nationwide Building Society	Nationwide Conference
2004–2007	Nationwide Building Society	Nationwide Conference / Nationwide Conference North / Nationwide Conference South
2007–2010	Blue Square	Blue Square Premier / Blue Square North / Blue Square South
2010–2013	Blue Square Bet	Blue Square Bet Premier / Blue Square Bet North / Blue Square Bet South
2013–2014	Skrill	Skrill Premier / Skrill North / Skrill South
2014–2015	Vanarama	Vanarama Conference / Vanarama Conference North / Vanarama Conference South
2015–2025	Vanarama	Vanarama National League / Vanarama National League North / Vanarama National League South
2025–present	Enterprise	Enterprise National League / Enterprise National League North / Enterprise National League South

== Media coverage ==
The National League's first major TV coverage began in 2006 when Setanta SportsThe channel showed 79 matches each season. It also showed the Conference League Cup. Prior to this, games from the league had occasionally been shown since 2001 on Sky Sports. Setanta's coverage continued until its British operations went under in June 2009.

On 19 August 2010, Premier Sports announced that it had bought the live and exclusive UK television rights to thirty matches per season from the Conference Premier for a total of three seasons. The thirty matches selected for broadcast included all five Conference Premier matches culminating in the Promotion Final itself. The deal with the then-Football Conference was a revenue sharing arrangement whereby clubs received 50% of revenue from subscriptions, on top of the normal rights fee paid by the broadcaster, once the costs of production were met. The Conference also earned 50% from all internet revenue associated with the deal and allowed them to retain advertising rights allied to those adverts shown with their matches. During the 2010–11 season, Premier Sports failed to attract enough viewers to its Conference football broadcasts to share any revenue with the clubs beyond the £5,000 broadcast fee paid to home clubs and £1,000 to away clubs.

BT Sport commenced a contract in 2013–14 to cover again up to 30 National league matches including the end of season semi finals and the Promotion Final. The deal worth £300,000, sees the fee to each home clubs as £7,000 and the away club £1,000. The National League also launched its own channel called NLTV, which focuses on all 68 member clubs across the three divisions.

On 30 July 2024, it was announced that DAZN would become the global home of the National League. This deal would involve all 557 National League matches, as well as a significant selection of National League North and National League South matches being streamed to over 200 countries, including the UK, on an exclusive basis. The deal is a seven-year deal that will run until the end of the 2030/2031 season

== See also ==
- National League (division)
- National League North
- National League South
