= Runcorn F.C. Halton =

English football club

- Full name: Runcorn F.C. Halton
- Nickname: The Linnets
- Founded: 1918
- Dissolved: 2006; 20 years ago
- Ground: Canal Street (1918–2001); Halton Stadium; Haig Avenue; Valerie Park

Runcorn F.C. Halton was an English football club that played in Runcorn, Widnes and Prescot at various points during its existence.

== History ==
The club was founded in 1918 as Highfield and Camden Tanneries Recreation Club. They became members of the Lancashire Combination in the same year, winning a cup. As Runcorn F.C., they were founder members of the Cheshire County League in 1919, and were its first champions. They won the league and Cheshire League Cup double in 1937.

Runcorn were founder members of the Northern Premier League in 1968 and won the Cheshire Senior Cup in 1973. The pinnacle of the club's history was the Alliance Premier League (now the National League) title success of 1982, but they were denied the chance of taking part in the English Football League elections because the club did not meet league requirements. This re-election system was replaced by automatic promotion from 1987 onwards, but it came too late to help Runcorn who by then were no longer a top team in the Football Conference.

In 1986, for the first time ever, Runcorn reached the final of the FA Trophy, but lost 1–0 to Altrincham. That season the team had beaten Boston 4–1 to reach the second round of the FA Cup.

In 1993–94, their stadium nearly fell apart. A perimeter wall collapsed during a cup game against Hull City, the roof blew off one stand, and the main stand was destroyed by a fire. This crippled the club, which was relegated in 1996 for the first time ever. In 2000, they sold the Canal Street ground where they had played since 1918, and moved to the 11,000-seat Halton Stadium in Widnes, which was also used by the town's rugby team and Everton reserves. The club renamed itself Runcorn FC Halton to reflect its new location. In 2004, they finished in 13th place in the Northern Premier League, and were promoted to the new Conference North. Their spell at this level lasted just one season before they were relegated back to the NPL. During this season, the club's precarious financial state caused them to move out of the Halton Stadium permanently, having finished the previous season at Southport's Haig Avenue, and to share Valerie Park, home of local rivals Prescot Cables, who also played in the Northern Premier League.

== Demise ==
During its final season the club went into severe financial crisis and was unable to pay its players' wages, forcing it to offload many of its key playing staff and replace them with amateur players used to playing at a much lower standard. This made for an embarrassing end to the season, with Runcorn finishing bottom and frequently suffering defeats by five or more goals, though their record defeat of 9–0 remained intact. After a second successive relegation, the club's future was in doubt, and the decision was made to officially confirm its resignation from the league and cease activity. By this time, disgruntled supporters had already formed the breakaway club Runcorn Linnets F.C., which was granted membership of the North West Counties League Division Two for the 2006–07 season.

== Honours ==
- Alliance Premier League (now National League)
  - Champions: 1981–82
- FA Trophy
  - Runners up: 1985–86, 1992–93, 1993–94
- Northern Premier League
  - Champions: 1975–76, 1980–81
- Northern Premier League Challenge Cup
  - Winners: 1974–75, 1979–80, 1980–81
- Northern Premier League President's Cup
  - Winners: 1998
- Cheshire Senior Cup
  - Winners 1984–85, 1985–86, 1986–87, 1987–88, 1988–89

== Former players ==
1. Players that have played/managed in the Football League or any foreign equivalent to this level (i.e. fully professional league).
2. Players with full international caps.
3. Players that hold a club record or have captained the club.

- (England) Alan Cocks
- (Scotland) Jimmy Dunn
- (England) John Fielding
- (England) Ken Furphy
- (England) Ian Woan
- (England) Billy Telford
- (England) Trevor Finnigan
