= 1982–83 Northern Premier League =

Northern Premier League
- Season: 1982–83
- Champions: Gateshead
- Promoted: Gateshead
- Relegated: Tamworth; Netherfield
- Matches: 462
- Goals: 1,476 (3.19 per match)

The 1982–83 Northern Premier League was the fifteenth season of the Northern Premier League, a regional football league in Northern England, the northern areas of the Midlands and North Wales. The season began on 21 August 1982 and concluded on 7 May 1983.

== Overview ==
The League featured twenty-two clubs.

=== Team changes ===
The following two clubs left the League at the end of the previous season:

- Bangor City promoted to Alliance Premier League
- Lancaster City relegated to North West Counties League Division One

The following two clubs joined the League at the start of the season:

- Chorley promoted from Cheshire County League Division One (returning after a ten years absence)
- Hyde United promoted from Cheshire County League Division One (returning after a twelve years absence)

=== League table ===
Pos	Team	Pld	W	D	L	GF	GA	GD	Pts	Qualification or relegation
1	Gateshead (C, P)	42	32	4	6	114	43	+71	100	Promoted to Alliance Premier League
2	Mossley	42	25	9	8	77	42	+35	84	
3	Burton Albion	42	24	9	9	81	53	+28	81	
4	Chorley	42	23	11	8	77	49	+28	80	
5	Macclesfield Town	42	24	8	10	71	49	+22	80	
6	Marine	42	17	17	8	81	57	+24	68	
7	Workington	42	19	10	13	71	55	+16	67	
8	Hyde United	42	18	12	12	91	63	+28	66	
9	King's Lynn	42	17	13	12	62	44	+18	64	Transferred to Southern League Premier Division
10	Matlock Town	42	18	10	14	70	65	+5	64	
11	Witton Albion	42	17	12	13	82	52	+30	63	
12	Buxton	42	17	9	16	60	62	−2	60	
13	Morecambe	42	16	11	15	75	66	+9	59	
14	Grantham	42	15	13	14	59	60	−1	58	
15	Southport	42	11	14	17	58	65	−7	47	
16	Goole Town	42	13	7	22	52	66	−14	46	
17	Gainsborough Trinity	42	11	9	22	60	71	−11	42	
18	Oswestry Town	42	10	8	24	56	99	−43	38	
19	South Liverpool	42	7	15	20	57	91	−34	36	
20	Tamworth (R)	42	7	8	27	44	97	−53	29	Relegated to Southern League Midland Division
21	Worksop Town	42	5	10	27	50	98	−48	25	
22	Netherfield (R)	42	2	9	31	28	129	−101	15	Relegated to NWCL Division One

(C) Champions; (P) Promoted; (R) Relegated

== Results ==
Home \ Away	BRT	BUX	CHO	GAI	GAT	GOO	GRN	HYD	KEN	KLY	MAC	MAR	MAT	MOR	MOS	OSW	SLI	SOU	TAM	WTN	WRK	WKS
Burton Albion		2–1	4–3	2–1	2–1	1–0	1–1	1–0	3–0	2–0	2–2	1–2	2–3	5–1	0–2	3–1	3–2	3–2	3–1	0–3	3–1	4–0
Buxton	0–2		0–1	4–0	1–2	0–1	2–2	3–2	1–0	0–0	2–1	0–2	2–0	1–5	1–0	4–1	2–0	4–1	3–2	1–0	1–4	1–1
Chorley	1–2	3–1		0–2	1–1	2–2	3–1	1–2	3–2	1–0	0–2	2–1	2–0	1–0	1–2	2–1	3–0	1–1	1–0	1–0	2–0	2–2
Gainsborough Trinity	1–2	3–1	1–1		2–4	3–0	1–3	1–2	0–0	0–3	3–4	0–2	0–2	1–2	2–1	6–1	1–1	1–0	2–0	1–3	3–4	3–3
Gateshead	2–0	3–1	1–2	4–1		6–0	4–0	3–2	8–0	3–0	2–1	4–0	5–1	2–1	1–0	2–2	3–0	2–0	5–0	2–0	3–1	6–0
Goole Town	0–2	3–0	2–4	0–0	1–3		1–0	2–0	4–0	0–0	1–3	0–3	4–0	2–1	1–2	2–0	3–1	1–2	1–1	0–2	0–0	1–1
Grantham Town	0–0	1–0	0–0	0–0	0–2	2–1		0–0	4–0	0–1	1–1	2–1	4–2	1–0	2–2	3–0	1–2	1–1	0–1	0–0	2–1	3–0
Hyde United	5–3	1–2	0–0	2–1	4–4	2–1	2–1		8–1	2–0	2–0	3–3	2–1	3–3	2–3	3–2	7–1	3–0	0–0	2–2	2–0	3–1
Kendal Town	0–1	0–4	0–3	1–1	0–1	3–1	0–2	2–5		0–3	0–4	0–0	1–1	2–3	1–2	0–0	2–2	0–2	3–1	0–3	0–3	0–3
King's Lynn	3–3	5–2	2–2	2–0	1–2	0–0	0–1	0–0	5–0		1–1	1–1	3–1	1–1	1–2	5–1	4–0	0–0	2–1	0–0	0–0	2–1
Macclesfield Town	1–1	1–1	1–2	2–1	1–0	0–1	3–0	1–0	6–0	0–4		1–1	0–2	4–2	0–1	3–2	1–0	3–2	1–0	3–2	2–2	2–1
Marine	3–3	1–1	5–1	2–2	3–2	5–2	1–1	2–1	5–1	1–3	2–3		1–1	0–2	1–0	1–1	3–3	2–2	2–2	0–2	3–1	4–2
Matlock Town	0–0	2–1	1–3	0–2	0–5	2–0	2–1	2–2	3–3	1–3	4–0	0–2		2–0	0–0	3–1	0–0	2–2	2–0	3–1	1–1	5–1
Morecambe	2–2	1–2	0–3	2–4	1–2	1–3	0–0	3–1	5–1	0–1	1–1	1–1	1–0		2–0	2–2	3–2	1–1	5–1	3–0	0–0	1–0
Mossley	1–1	0–0	2–2	2–1	4–0	2–1	2–0	2–1	4–1	2–0	1–0	3–1	3–2	3–1		1–3	3–0	1–4	5–0	2–2	1–0	5–1
Oswestry Town	2–1	3–3	0–4	0–1	0–5	1–0	2–1	1–6	3–1	1–4	0–2	0–2	1–2	4–2	1–2		1–1	2–2	1–3	4–3	1–2	0–0
South Liverpool	0–2	0–1	1–4	0–3	1–2	0–2	2–2	2–2	6–1	1–1	0–1	1–1	2–2	0–4	0–0	3–1		1–1	2–2	2–7	2–1	2–1
Southport	2–1	0–0	0–1	4–2	0–2	3–1	0–2	2–3	3–0	0–1	0–2	2–1	1–2	2–2	1–1	2–3	2–3		1–0	1–2	1–2	3–2
Tamworth	0–3	0–2	2–2	1–0	1–2	1–3	1–2	2–1	2–2	1–0	1–2	1–1	0–6	1–3	0–4	2–3	1–5	2–3		1–2	1–3	3–2
Witton Albion	0–1	1–2	3–3	3–1	1–1	2–1	4–0	0–0	8–0	3–0	0–1	1–2	2–0	3–3	0–0	2–0	2–2	0–0	4–1		2–2	4–1
Workington	2–0	1–1	2–0	0–4	6–0	2–1	4–0	2–1	3–0	0–1	0–2	0–0	2–4	0–2	4–1	1–0	3–2	2–2	2–2	2–1		3–0
Worksop Town	1–4	4–1	0–3	0–0	1–2	3–2	0–2	2–2	0–0	3–2	1–2	1–3	1–2	1–2	0–3	2–3	2–2	0–0	1–2	3–2	1–2	

Updated to match(es) played on 7 May 1983. Source: The Football Archives
Legend: Blue = home team win; Yellow = draw; Red = away team win.

=== Stadia and locations ===
Locations of the 1982–83 Northern Premier League teams

Club	Stadium
Burton Albion	Eton Park
Buxton	The Silverlands
Chorley	Victory Park
Gainsborough Trinity	The Northolme
Gateshead United	Gateshead Youth Stadium
Goole Town	Victoria Pleasure Ground
Grantham	London Road
Hyde United	Ewen Fields
King's Lynn	The Walks
Macclesfield Town	Moss Rose
Marine	Rossett Park
Matlock Town	Causeway Lane
Morecambe	Christie Park
Mossley	Seel Park
Netherfield	Parkside
Oswestry Town	Victoria Road
South Liverpool	Holly Park
Southport	Haig Avenue
Tamworth	The Lamb Ground
Witton Albion	Central Ground
Workington	Borough Park
Worksop Town	Central Avenue

== Cup Results ==
Challenge Cup:'

- Burton Albion 2–1 Macclesfield Town

President's Cup:

- Kings Lynn 3–2 Burton Albion

Northern Premier League Shield: Between Champions of NPL Premier Division and Winners of the NPL Cup.

- Burton Albion 2–0 Gateshead

== End of the season ==
At the end of the fifteenth season of the Northern Premier League, Gateshead applied to join the Alliance Premier League and was successful.

=== Promotion and relegation ===
The following four clubs left the League at the end of the season:

- Gateshead promoted to Alliance Premier League
- King's Lynn transferred to Southern League Premier Division
- Tamworth demoted and transferred to Southern League Midland Division
- Netherfield relegated to North West Counties League Division One

The following four clubs joined the League the following season:

- Barrow relegated from Alliance Premier League
- Stafford Rangers relegated from Alliance Premier League
- Horwich RMI promoted from North West Counties League Division One
- Rhyl promoted from North West Counties League Division One
