= 1981–82 Northern Premier League =

Northern Premier League
- Season: 1981–82
- Champions: Bangor City
- Promoted: Bangor City
- Relegated: Lancaster City
- Matches: 462
- Goals: 1,293 (2.8 per match)
- Biggest home win: Workington 7–1 Morecambe (29 September 1981); Witton Albion 6–0 Netherfield (23 February 1982)
- Biggest away win: Morecambe 0–9 Bangor City (21 September 1981)
- Highest scoring: Gainsborough Trinity 4–5 Bangor City (22 August 1981) Morecambe 0–9 Bangor City (21 September 1981) Morecambe 2–7 Bangor City (31 October 1981)

The 1981–82 Northern Premier League was the fourteenth season of the Northern Premier League, a regional football league in Northern England, the northern areas of the Midlands and North Wales. The season began on 15 August 1981 and concluded on 1 May 1982.

== Overview ==
The League featured twenty-two clubs.

=== Team changes ===
The following club left the League at the end of the previous season:

- Runcorn promoted to Alliance Premier League

The following club joined the League at the start of the season:

- Bangor City relegated from Alliance Premier League (returning after a two years absence)

=== League table ===
| Pos | Team | Pld | W | D | L | GF | GA | GD | Pts | Qualification or relegation |
|---|---|---|---|---|---|---|---|---|---|---|
| 1 | Bangor City (C, P) | 42 | 27 | 8 | 7 | 108 | 60 | +48 | 62 | Promoted to Alliance Premier League |
| 2 | Mossley | 42 | 24 | 11 | 7 | 76 | 43 | +33 | 59 | |
| 3 | Witton Albion | 42 | 22 | 10 | 10 | 75 | 44 | +31 | 54 | |
| 4 | Gateshead | 42 | 19 | 14 | 9 | 65 | 49 | +16 | 52 | |
| 5 | King's Lynn | 42 | 19 | 12 | 11 | 61 | 36 | +25 | 50 | |
| 6 | Grantham | 42 | 18 | 13 | 11 | 65 | 53 | +12 | 49 | |
| 7 | Burton Albion | 42 | 19 | 9 | 14 | 71 | 62 | +9 | 47 | |
| 8 | Southport | 42 | 16 | 14 | 12 | 63 | 55 | +8 | 46 | |
| 9 | Marine | 42 | 17 | 12 | 13 | 64 | 57 | +7 | 46 | |
| 10 | Macclesfield Town | 42 | 17 | 9 | 16 | 67 | 58 | +9 | 43 | |
| 11 | Workington | 42 | 18 | 7 | 17 | 62 | 60 | +2 | 43 | |
| 12 | Worksop Town | 42 | 15 | 13 | 14 | 52 | 60 | −8 | 43 | |
| 13 | South Liverpool | 42 | 13 | 13 | 16 | 55 | 57 | −2 | 39 | |
| 14 | Goole Town | 42 | 13 | 13 | 16 | 56 | 60 | −4 | 39 | |
| 15 | Oswestry Town | 42 | 14 | 11 | 17 | 55 | 59 | −4 | 39 | |
| 16 | Buxton | 42 | 14 | 11 | 17 | 48 | 56 | −8 | 39 | |
| 17 | Lancaster City (R) | 42 | 13 | 12 | 17 | 47 | 50 | −3 | 38 | Relegated to NWCL Division One |
| 18 | Gainsborough Trinity | 42 | 10 | 13 | 19 | 60 | 69 | −9 | 33 | |
| 19 | Tamworth | 42 | 10 | 9 | 23 | 31 | 56 | −25 | 29 | |
| 20 | Morecambe | 42 | 9 | 11 | 22 | 43 | 86 | −43 | 29 | |
| 21 | Matlock Town | 42 | 7 | 12 | 23 | 38 | 72 | −34 | 26 | |
| 22 | Netherfield | 42 | 5 | 9 | 28 | 31 | 91 | −60 | 19 | |

Updated to match(es) played on 1 May 1982. Source: The Football Archives
Rules for classification: 1) points; 2) goal difference; 3) number of goals scored. The points system up until the 1982–83 season: 2 points for a win, 1 point for a draw and 0 points for losing.
(C) Champions; (P) Promoted; (R) Relegated

=== Results ===
| Home \ Away | BAN | BRT | BUX | GAI | GAT | GOO | GRN | KLY | LNC | MAC | MAR | MAT | MOR | MOS | NET | OSW | SLI | SOU | TAM | WTN | WRK | WKS |
|---|---|---|---|---|---|---|---|---|---|---|---|---|---|---|---|---|---|---|---|---|---|---|
| Bangor City | | 3–2 | 3–1 | 2–1 | 3–1 | 3–0 | 3–1 | 2–0 | 2–1 | 4–4 | 2–1 | 2–1 | 5–2 | 2–1 | 2–0 | 0–0 | 3–1 | 4–2 | 0–0 | 1–1 | 4–1 | 2–1 |
| Burton Albion | 2–2 | | 1–0 | 2–0 | 1–1 | 3–1 | 1–1 | 1–0 | 0–0 | 4–1 | 1–1 | 2–2 | 3–1 | 0–2 | 5–1 | 3–1 | 4–2 | 0–2 | 0–3 | 2–1 | 2–2 | 2–0 |
| Buxton | 1–0 | 5–1 | | 2–1 | 0–0 | 1–0 | 2–3 | 1–0 | 2–1 | 0–4 | 1–2 | 0–0 | 1–2 | 1–2 | 1–1 | 1–0 | 1–2 | 3–1 | 1–1 | 3–3 | 2–1 | 6–1 |
| Gainsborough Trinity | 4–5 | 4–3 | 0–0 | | 1–1 | 2–2 | 4–1 | 1–3 | 1–2 | 1–4 | 2–2 | 2–1 | 2–0 | 0–1 | 3–1 | 1–2 | 2–0 | 4–0 | 0–0 | 0–1 | 4–2 | 3–0 |
| Gateshead United | 3–3 | 2–4 | 2–0 | 3–2 | | 0–0 | 1–1 | 2–0 | 0–0 | 2–1 | 3–2 | 1–0 | 4–0 | 0–1 | 4–0 | 0–0 | 2–1 | 0–0 | 2–0 | 1–1 | 4–1 | 0–0 |
| Goole Town | 0–1 | 4–1 | 2–1 | 2–2 | 3–0 | | 0–2 | 0–4 | 3–1 | 2–2 | 1–1 | 3–2 | 4–0 | 1–1 | 0–1 | 4–1 | 2–0 | 2–2 | 0–1 | 1–0 | 1–0 | 0–3 |
| Grantham | 2–2 | 1–2 | 2–0 | 3–0 | 2–1 | 1–1 | | 2–2 | 1–0 | 1–0 | 2–1 | 2–0 | 2–0 | 1–2 | 0–0 | 2–2 | 1–1 | 2–1 | 0–2 | 1–1 | 4–2 | 1–1 |
| King's Lynn | 2–0 | 3–0 | 4–1 | 3–0 | 1–0 | 2–0 | 3–0 | | 2–1 | 1–1 | 1–2 | 2–2 | 1–1 | 3–1 | 0–1 | 0–0 | 2–2 | 0–0 | 1–0 | 1–0 | 3–1 | 1–1 |
| Lancaster City | 0–3 | 1–0 | 2–1 | 1–1 | 2–3 | 0–0 | 1–2 | 1–2 | | 1–0 | 3–2 | 2–0 | 1–1 | 1–1 | 2–0 | 1–1 | 1–2 | 1–0 | 1–2 | 2–1 | 0–1 | 1–0 |
| Macclesfield Town | 4–0 | 1–2 | 3–1 | 1–1 | 0–1 | 1–1 | 2–0 | 2–1 | 4–2 | | 1–1 | 0–1 | 2–1 | 3–0 | 3–0 | 3–2 | 2–1 | 1–1 | 3–1 | 0–2 | 0–3 | 4–2 |
| Marine | 2–1 | 1–1 | 2–1 | 2–2 | 3–1 | 2–0 | 2–0 | 1–0 | 0–0 | 3–0 | | 1–1 | 2–0 | 2–0 | 2–2 | 0–1 | 3–1 | 1–4 | 2–1 | 2–3 | 1–0 | 1–1 |
| Matlock Town | 2–7 | 0–1 | 0–0 | 1–1 | 1–5 | 1–0 | 0–4 | 1–3 | 2–1 | 0–1 | 3–0 | | 1–1 | 2–2 | 1–0 | 0–1 | 0–2 | 1–4 | 2–0 | 1–2 | 1–2 | 0–1 |
| Morecambe | 0–9 | 1–2 | 0–0 | 0–2 | 2–3 | 2–2 | 3–1 | 0–0 | 1–4 | 1–2 | 3–2 | 0–3 | | 1–2 | 2–1 | 2–1 | 0–0 | 0–0 | 1–0 | 1–3 | 0–0 | 0–0 |
| Mossley | 6–1 | 1–0 | 3–0 | 5–2 | 1–1 | 2–1 | 3–1 | 0–0 | 0–0 | 1–0 | 3–1 | 1–1 | 3–2 | | 4–2 | 2–0 | 4–1 | 4–2 | 4–0 | 2–2 | 1–3 | 1–0 |
| Netherfield | 1–5 | 0–5 | 0–0 | 1–1 | 2–3 | 0–2 | 2–2 | 0–2 | 1–3 | 1–1 | 0–1 | 3–0 | 1–5 | 2–2 | | 0–1 | 1–0 | 1–3 | 0–1 | 0–2 | 1–2 | 1–3 |
| Oswestry Town | 1–2 | 2–1 | 5–2 | 2–1 | 3–0 | 2–0 | 0–4 | 2–3 | 0–0 | 2–0 | 2–2 | 4–0 | 1–2 | 1–1 | 1–1 | | 2–3 | 2–0 | 2–1 | 0–2 | 3–2 | 0–2 |
| South Liverpool | 3–3 | 3–1 | 0–1 | 3–0 | 1–1 | 3–1 | 0–3 | 0–0 | 0–0 | 1–0 | 0–3 | 3–0 | 0–0 | 1–1 | 4–0 | 2–0 | | 0–1 | 0–0 | 1–2 | 3–2 | 0–1 |
| Southport | 2–1 | 2–1 | 0–1 | 1–1 | 2–0 | 2–0 | 2–1 | 1–1 | 2–3 | 2–2 | 1–0 | 1–1 | 2–1 | 1–0 | 0–2 | 2–2 | 1–1 | | 1–1 | 2–1 | 0–0 | 4–1 |
| Tamworth | 1–4 | 2–3 | 0–0 | 2–1 | 0–1 | 0–0 | 1–2 | 0–2 | 1–0 | 0–2 | 0–1 | 2–1 | 0–1 | 0–2 | 3–0 | 2–0 | 0–2 | 0–3 | | 1–2 | 0–0 | 1–1 |
| Witton Albion | 1–0 | 1–2 | 0–0 | 0–0 | 0–1 | 2–3 | 1–1 | 1–0 | 1–1 | 3–0 | 5–2 | 0–0 | 5–1 | 1–0 | 6–0 | 2–1 | 2–1 | 4–3 | 5–1 | | 2–1 | 3–0 |
| Workington | 0–1 | 1–0 | 0–1 | 1–0 | 3–4 | 2–4 | 1–1 | 2–1 | 3–2 | 1–0 | 1–0 | 2–1 | 7–1 | 0–1 | 1–0 | 1–1 | 2–2 | 3–2 | 1–0 | 1–0 | | 2–0 |
| Worksop Town | 1–6 | 0–0 | 1–2 | 1–0 | 1–1 | 3–3 | 0–1 | 2–1 | 1–0 | 3–2 | 2–2 | 1–1 | 2–1 | 0–2 | 3–0 | 2–1 | 2–2 | 1–1 | 2–0 | 3–0 | 2–1 | |

Updated to match(es) played on 1 May 1982. Source: The Football Archives
Legend: Blue = home team win; Yellow = draw; Red = away team win.

=== Stadia and locations ===
Locations of the 1981–82 Northern Premier League teams

| Club | Stadium |
|---|---|
| Bangor City | Farrar Road |
| Burton Albion | Eton Park |
| Buxton | The Silverlands |
| Gainsborough Trinity | The Northolme |
| Gateshead United | Gateshead Youth Stadium |
| Goole Town | Victoria Pleasure Ground |
| Grantham | London Road |
| King's Lynn | The Walks |
| Lancaster City | Great Axe |
| Macclesfield Town | Moss Rose |
| Marine | Rossett Park |
| Matlock Town | Causeway Lane |
| Morecambe | Christie Park |
| Mossley | Seel Park |
| Netherfield | Parkside |
| Oswestry Town | Victoria Road |
| South Liverpool | Holly Park |
| Southport | Haig Avenue |
| Tamworth | The Lamb Ground |
| Witton Albion | Central Ground |
| Workington | Borough Park |
| Worksop Town | Central Avenue |

== Cup results ==
=== Challenge Cup ===
| Home team | Score | Away team |
|---|---|---|
| Gainsborough Trinity | 1–0 | Mossley |

=== President's Cup ===
| Home team | Score | Away team |
|---|---|---|
| Buxton | 4–3 | Goole Town |

=== Northern Premier League Shield ===
Between Champions of NPL Premier Division and Winners of the NPL Cup.

| Home team | Score | Away team |
|---|---|---|
| Bangor City | ?-? | Gainsborough Trinity |

=== FA Cup ===
None of the twenty-two Northern Premier League clubs reached the second round:

First Round

| Home team | Score | Away team | |
|---|---|---|---|
| Stockport County | 3–1 | Mossley | |
| Workington | 1–1 | Huddersfield Town | |
| Huddersfield Town | 5–0 | Workington | Replay |

=== FA Trophy ===
None of the twenty-two Northern Premier League clubs reached the fourth round:

Third Round

| Home team | Score | Away team |
|---|---|---|
| Altrincham | 2–0 | Mossley |
| Bishop's Stortford | 6–1 | Witton Albion |

== End of the season ==
At the end of the fourteenth season of the Northern Premier League, Bangor City applied to join the Alliance Premier League and were successful.

=== Promotion and relegation ===
The following two clubs left the League at the end of the season:

- Bangor City promoted to Alliance Premier League
- Lancaster City relegated to North West Counties League Division One

The following two clubs joined the League the following season:

- Chorley promoted from Cheshire County League Division One (returning after a ten years absence)
- Hyde United promoted from Cheshire County League Division One (returning after a twelve years absence)
