= 1980–81 Northern Premier League =

Northern Premier League
- Season: 1980–81
- Champions: Runcorn
- Promoted: Runcorn
- Relegated: none
- Matches: 462
- Goals: 1,348 (2.92 per match)
- Biggest home win: Buxton 7–0 Tamworth (18 October 1980); Marine 7–0 Grantham (28 February 1981)
- Biggest away win: Tamworth 0–5 Mossley (29 April 1981)
- Highest scoring: Macclesfield Town 3–5 Worksop Town (7 March 1981); Netherfield 4–4 Gateshead (31 March 1981)
- Longest winning run: 10 matches Runcorn (8 September 1980– 11 November 1980)
- Longest unbeaten run: 22 matches Runcorn (16 August 1980 – 13 December 1980)
- Longest winless run: 16 matches King's Lynn (25 October 1980 – 21 February 1981)
- Longest losing run: 6 matches Gateshead (6 September 1980 – 15 November 1980); Tamworth (25 October 1980 – 13 December 1980)

The 1980–81 Northern Premier League was the thirteenth season of the Northern Premier League, a regional football league in Northern England, the northern areas of the Midlands and North Wales. The season began on 16 August 1980 and concluded on 3 May 1981.

== Overview ==
The League featured twenty-two clubs.

=== Team changes ===
The following club left the League at the end of the previous season:

- Frickley Athletic promoted to Alliance Premier League

The following club joined the League at the start of the season:

- King's Lynn transferred from Southern League Midland Division

=== League table ===
Pos	Team	Pld	W	D	L	GF	GA	GD	Pts	Qualification or relegation
1	Runcorn (C, P)	42	32	7	3	99	22	+77	71	Promoted to Alliance Premier League
2	Mossley	42	24	7	11	95	55	+40	55	
3	Marine	42	22	10	10	66	41	+25	54	
4	Buxton	42	21	7	14	64	50	+14	49	
5	Gainsborough Trinity	42	17	13	12	80	57	+23	47	
6	Burton Albion	42	19	8	15	63	54	+9	46	
7	Witton Albion	42	19	8	15	70	62	+8	46	
8	Goole Town	42	14	16	12	56	50	+6	44	
9	South Liverpool	42	19	6	17	59	64	−5	44	
10	Workington	42	15	13	14	57	48	+9	43	
11	Gateshead	42	12	18	12	65	61	+4	42	
12	Worksop Town	42	15	11	16	66	61	+5	41	
13	Macclesfield Town	42	13	13	16	52	69	−17	39	
14	Grantham	42	14	9	19	57	74	−17	37	
15	Matlock Town	42	12	12	18	57	80	−23	36	
16	Lancaster City	42	13	9	20	48	70	−22	35	
17	Netherfield	42	11	12	19	73	81	−8	34	
18	Oswestry Town	42	13	8	21	54	67	−13	34	
19	King's Lynn	42	8	18	16	46	65	−19	34	
20	Southport	42	11	11	20	42	68	−26	33	
21	Morecambe	42	11	8	23	42	74	−32	30	
22	Tamworth	42	9	12	21	38	76	−38	30	

Updated to match(es) played on 3 May 1981. Source: The Football Archives
Rules for classification: 1) points; 2) goal difference; 3) number of goals scored. The points system up until the 1982–83 season: 2 points for a win, 1 point for a draw and 0 points for losing.
(C) Champions; (P) Promoted

=== Results ===
Home \ Away	BRT	BUX	GAI	GAT	GOO	GRN	KLY	LNC	MAC	MAR	MAT	MOR	MOS	NET	OSW	RUN	SLI	SOU	TAM	WTN	WRK	WKS
Burton Albion		2–0	0–1	1–0	2–2	2–0	4–1	2–1	1–1	0–0	3–0	3–1	1–5	1–1	2–1	0–1	0–1	5–2	3–0	0–0	5–0	1–1
Buxton	1–2		2–1	1–1	0–1	4–1	1–1	3–0	1–2	3–1	2–1	0–3	0–2	3–3	2–1	1–1	2–3	2–0	7–0	0–0	2–0	1–0
Gainsborough Trinity	2–0	0–0		2–1	2–1	1–1	6–0	6–0	6–1	0–2	3–2	2–0	1–1	4–3	3–2	0–2	3–0	0–0	2–3	3–1	1–1	1–1
Gateshead United	1–0	2–0	2–2		0–0	1–1	3–2	2–2	0–0	0–1	5–0	2–1	1–5	0–0	2–2	1–1	2–0	0–2	0–0	1–2	1–0	1–2
Goole Town	0–1	2–4	1–1	2–2		0–1	2–2	1–1	3–1	0–0	3–0	1–0	3–4	2–0	3–0	1–2	2–1	2–1	2–2	0–2	1–0	3–0
Grantham	1–2	4–0	0–3	1–4	2–0		3–1	0–1	4–2	1–3	3–2	0–1	2–4	5–2	0–1	1–1	1–1	3–1	1–0	0–0	2–0	2–2
King's Lynn	0–4	0–1	1–1	1–1	2–2	1–0		0–0	1–2	2–0	0–2	0–0	2–2	2–2	1–1	0–2	2–2	3–0	4–1	1–3	2–0	1–1
Lancaster City	2–0	0–1	1–5	3–2	0–0	2–0	1–0		1–1	1–2	1–3	1–1	1–2	4–1	4–2	0–2	0–3	0–1	1–1	3–0	2–3	2–2
Macclesfield Town	1–0	2–3	2–2	2–4	1–1	2–2	0–0	2–3		2–1	1–1	1–1	0–3	2–0	1–0	2–5	1–2	0–1	2–1	0–3	2–2	3–5
Marine	4–0	2–0	2–0	1–1	2–2	7–0	1–1	2–1	1–1		2–0	5–1	2–0	2–1	3–0	0–4	3–2	1–0	1–0	3–0	1–0	2–1
Matlock Town	3–1	0–1	2–1	2–4	3–2	2–3	3–3	2–0	0–1	0–0		2–1	1–4	1–1	1–3	0–4	4–2	1–1	0–0	0–0	0–4	3–3
Morecambe	2–3	2–1	2–0	1–0	0–0	1–4	0–1	1–3	2–1	0–0	2–1		1–3	1–4	2–0	0–2	2–1	1–2	4–0	0–2	2–3	1–1
Mossley	3–2	0–1	1–0	1–1	1–1	1–2	1–0	0–1	3–0	0–0	2–3	3–4		4–3	1–1	1–2	3–0	2–0	6–1	5–0	2–3	3–2
Netherfield	0–2	1–2	1–3	4–4	2–1	4–0	1–0	4–1	1–1	1–1	3–1	3–0	0–2		0–1	0–1	2–3	2–1	2–0	3–3	2–2	2–3
Oswestry Town	4–0	1–3	1–2	4–2	0–1	1–0	2–2	0–1	0–0	2–1	1–2	0–0	3–3	1–0		0–2	2–0	0–1	2–0	3–2	2–1	3–4
Runcorn	4–0	1–0	3–0	0–1	2–0	2–1	0–0	5–0	2–0	3–0	5–0	3–0	4–1	1–1	3–1		2–3	3–0	0–0	5–0	3–0	1–0
South Liverpool	2–1	1–4	1–1	2–1	2–3	4–0	0–2	1–0	2–1	2–0	0–0	1–0	0–1	4–3	2–0	2–4		2–0	1–3	1–0	1–0	1–0
Southport	1–1	0–2	4–2	1–1	0–0	0–3	2–0	1–2	0–1	2–3	2–2	1–1	1–3	0–0	3–2	1–3	2–0		2–2	2–2	0–0	2–1
Tamworth	0–2	0–1	1–1	1–1	0–2	1–1	2–0	1–0	0–3	3–2	2–2	2–0	0–5	4–3	0–2	1–4	0–0	1–0		2–0	0–1	2–3
Witton Albion	3–1	0–0	4–3	3–4	3–1	3–1	4–0	4–1	0–1	3–0	0–3	5–0	2–0	1–4	3–1	1–0	3–1	4–0	2–1		1–1	0–1
Workington	0–0	4–1	2–2	3–1	1–1	0–0	1–1	1–0	1–2	0–2	0–1	4–0	3–0	1–2	3–0	1–1	1–1	4–0	0–0	2–1		2–0
Worksop Town	1–3	2–1	2–1	2–2	0–1	3–0	1–3	0–0	0–1	1–0	1–1	3–0	0–2	6–1	1–1	1–2	3–1	1–2	1–0	4–0	0–2	

Updated to match(es) played on 3 May 1981. Source: The Football Archives
Legend: Blue = home team win; Yellow = draw; Red = away team win.

=== Stadia and locations ===
Locations of the 1980–81 Northern Premier League teams

Club	Stadium
Burton Albion	Eton Park
Buxton	The Silverlands
Gainsborough Trinity	The Northolme
Gateshead United	Gateshead Youth Stadium
Goole Town	Victoria Pleasure Ground
Grantham	London Road
King's Lynn	The Walks
Lancaster City	Great Axe
Macclesfield Town	Moss Rose
Marine	Rossett Park
Matlock Town	Causeway Lane
Morecambe	Christie Park
Mossley	Seel Park
Netherfield	Parkside
Oswestry Town	Victoria Road
Runcorn	Canal Street
South Liverpool	Holly Park
Southport	Haig Avenue
Tamworth	The Lamb Ground
Witton Albion	Central Ground
Workington	Borough Park
Worksop Town	Central Avenue

== Cup Results ==
Challenge Cup Cup:

- Marine bt. Runcorn

Northern Premier League Shield:

- Runcorn bt. Mossley

== Cup results ==
=== Challenge Cup ===
Home team	Score	Away team
Marine	3–4	Runcorn

=== Northern Premier League Shield ===
Between Champions of NPL Premier Division and Winners of the NPL Cup.
As Runcorn won both the Northern Premier League and the Challenge Cup, Mossley qualified as 2nd placed team of the NPL.

Home team	Score	Away team
Runcorn	2–1	Mossley

=== FA Cup ===
Only one of the twenty-two Northern Premier League clubs reached the second round:

Second Round

Home team	Score	Away team
Mossley	1–3	Mansfield Town

=== FA Trophy ===
One of the twenty-two Northern Premier League clubs reached the fourth round:

Fourth Round

Home team	Score	Away team
Bangor City	5–3	Mossley

== End of the season ==
At the end of the thirteenth season of the Northern Premier League, Runcorn applied to join the Alliance Premier League and were successful.

=== Promotion and relegation ===
The following club left the League at the end of the season:

- Runcorn promoted to Alliance Premier League

The following club joined the League the following season:

- Bangor City relegated from Alliance Premier League (returning after a two years absence)
