= 1982–83 North West Counties Football League =

North West Counties Football League
- Season: 1982–83

The 1982–83 North West Counties Football League was the first in the history of the North West Counties Football League, a football competition in England. The League was formed from a merger between the Cheshire County League and the Lancashire Combination.

The league comprised three divisions with clubs allocated to them based on a grading of their ground's facilities and their finishing positions over the previous two seasons. There was additionally the League Challenge Cup knockout competition open to all clubs and a reserves team section.

== Division One ==
North West Counties Football League Division One
- Season: 1982–83
- Teams: 20
- Champions: Burscough
- Promoted: Rhyl; Horwich RMI
- Relegated: Nantwich Town
- Matches: 380
- Goals: 1,122 (2.95 per match)

The division featured 20 clubs, 18 from the previous season's Cheshire County League and 1 each transferring from the previous season's Northern League and the Northern Premier League:

- From the Cheshire County League, Division One
  - Accrington Stanley
  - Ashton United
  - Bootle
  - Burscough
  - Curzon Ashton
  - Darwen
  - Formby
  - Glossop
  - Horwich RMI
  - Leek Town
  - Nantwich Town
  - Prescot Cables
  - St. Helens Town
  - Stalybridge Celtic
  - Winsford United
- From the Cheshire County League, Division Two
  - Congleton Town
  - Leyland Motors
  - Rhyl
- From Northern Premier League
  - Lancaster City
- From Northern League
  - Penrith

At the end of the season the champions Burscough did not apply for promotion to the Northern Premier League and so remained in the division; however, second and third placed Rhyl and Horwich RMI did leave as both were elected to the Northern Premier League Also leaving the division were last placed club Nantwich Town who were relegated to Division Two; owing to two clubs taking promotion from the division St Helens Town were reprieved from relegation.

=== League table ===
Pos	Team	Pld	W	D	L	GF	GA	GD	Pts	Season End Notes
1	Burscough (C)	38	26	7	5	93	45	+48	59	
2	Rhyl (P)	38	23	11	4	76	30	+46	57	Promoted to the Northern Premier League
3	Horwich RMI (P)	38	22	10	6	77	35	+42	54	Promoted to the Northern Premier League
4	Stalybridge Celtic	38	17	15	6	60	32	+28	49	
5	Winsford United	38	18	10	10	72	48	+24	46	
6	Darwen	38	17	12	9	68	46	+22	46	
7	Lancaster City	38	17	11	10	69	54	+15	45	
8	Congleton Town	38	13	14	11	52	35	+17	40	
9	Penrith	38	17	6	15	68	61	+7	40	
10	Accrington Stanley	38	13	12	13	56	55	+1	38	
11	Leek Town	38	14	9	15	42	44	−2	37	
12	Curzon Ashton	38	14	8	16	46	47	−1	36	
13	Ashton United	38	13	10	15	55	69	−14	36	
14	Bootle	38	14	6	18	55	79	−24	32 (Note: Bootle deducted 2 point)	
15	Prescot Cables	38	9	13	16	50	60	−10	31	
16	Formby	38	10	8	20	48	68	−20	28	
17	Leyland Motors	38	7	10	21	34	74	−40	24	
18	Glossop	38	6	11	21	29	67	−38	23	
19	St Helens Town	38	5	10	23	29	80	−51	20	Reprieved from relegation
20	Nantwich Town (R)	38	6	5	27	43	93	−50	17	Relegated to Division Two

Source: NWCFL: Final Tables, Season 1982/83
Rules for classification: 1) points; 2) goal difference; 3) number of goals scored.
The points system until the 1990–91 season: 2 points for a win, 1 point for a draw and 0 points for losing.
(C) Champions; (P) Promoted; (R) Relegated

== Division Two ==
North West Counties Football League Division Two
- Season: 1982–83
- Teams: 20
- Champions: Radcliffe Borough
- Promoted: Radcliffe Borough; Caernarfon Town
- Relegated: Padiham
- Matches: 380
- Goals: 1,269 (3.34 per match)

The division featured 20 clubs, 14 from the previous season's Cheshire County League and 6 from the previous season's Lancashire Combination:

- From the Cheshire County League, Division One
  - Droylsden
  - Fleetwood Town
  - Rossendale United
- From the Cheshire County League, Division Two
  - Atherton Laburnum Rovers
  - Eastwood Hanley
  - Ellesmere Port & Neston
  - Ford Motors
  - Irlam Town
  - Kirkby Town
  - Prescot BI
  - Radcliffe Borough
  - New Mills
  - Salford
  - Skelmersdale United
- From the Lancashire Combination
  - Caernarfon Town
  - Chadderton
  - Great Harwood Town
  - Lytham
  - Padiham
  - Wren Rovers

At the end of the season the two top clubs, the champions Radcliffe Borough and runners-up Caernarfon Town, were promoted to Division One and Padiham were relegated to Division Three. Two clubs exited the league: Kirkby Town were expelled (to return a year later) as their ground was adjudged below the required standard for the league and New Mills folded.

=== League table ===
Pos	Team	Pld	W	D	L	GF	GA	GD	Pts	Season End Notes
1	Radcliffe Borough (C, P)	38	33	4	1	110	25	+85	70	Promoted to Division One
2	Caernarfon Town (P)	38	28	7	3	85	28	+57	63	Promoted to Division One
3	Wren Rovers	38	23	7	8	84	38	+46	53	
4	Eastwood Hanley	38	23	7	8	81	42	+39	53	
5	Kirkby Town	38	22	3	13	80	60	+20	47	Expelled (ground substandard)
6	Irlam Town	38	17	8	13	79	52	+27	42	
7	Chadderton	38	18	6	14	55	51	+4	42	
8	Rossendale United	38	15	10	13	75	68	+7	40	
9	Ford Motors	38	18	4	16	61	59	+2	40	
10	Ellesmere Port & Neston	38	17	5	16	56	68	−12	39	
11	Skelmersdale United	38	13	11	14	70	63	+7	37	
12	Fleetwood Town	38	12	8	18	54	80	−26	32	
13	Atherton Laburnum Rovers	38	11	9	18	52	70	−18	31	
14	Lytham	38	11	5	22	54	71	−17	27	
15	Great Harwood Town	38	8	10	20	54	76	−22	26	
16	Salford	38	10	6	22	43	86	−43	26	
17	Droylsden	38	11	5	22	49	71	−22	25 (Note: Droylsden deducted 2 points.)	
18	Prescot BI	38	10	5	23	46	81	−35	25	
19	Padiham (R)	38	8	6	24	41	74	−33	22	Relegated to Division Three
20	New Mills	38	7	4	27	40	106	−66	18	Resigned (folded)

Source: NWCFL: Final Tables, Season 1982/83
Rules for classification: 1) points; 2) goal difference; 3) number of goals scored.
The points system until the 1990–91 season: 2 points for a win, 1 point for a draw and 0 points for losing.
(C) Champions; (P) Promoted; (R) Relegated

== Division Three ==
North West Counties Football League Division Three
- Season: 1982–83
- Teams: 18
- Champions: Colne Dynamoes
- Promoted: Colne Dynamoes; Warrington Town
- Matches: 306
- Goals: 1,049 (3.43 per match)

The division featured 18 clubs, 12 from the previous season's Lancashire Combination, five from the previous season's Cheshire County League and one transferring from the Mid-Cheshire League:

- From the Lancashire Combination
  - Ashton Athletic
  - Bacup Borough
  - Blackpool Mechanics
  - Bolton ST
  - Clitheroe
  - Colne Dynamoes
  - Daisy Hill
  - Nelson
  - Oldham Dew
  - Vulcan Newton
  - Whitworth Valley
  - Wigan Rovers
- From the Cheshire County League, Division Two
  - Ashton Town
  - Atherton Collieries
  - Maghull
  - Prestwich Heys
  - Warrington Town
- From the Mid-Cheshire League
  - Newton

At the end of the season three clubs left the division: the two top clubs, the champions Colne Dynamoes and runners-up Warrington Town, were promoted to Division Two; and Wigan Rovers resigned from the league and joined the West Lancashire League.

=== League table ===
Pos	Team	Pld	W	D	L	GF	GA	GD	Pts	Season End Notes
1	Colne Dynamoes (C, P)	34	25	5	4	95	37	+58	55	Promoted to Division Two
2	Warrington Town (P)	34	24	6	4	83	33	+50	54	Promoted to Division Two
3	Clitheroe	34	22	7	5	87	35	+52	51	
4	Prestwich Heys	34	18	11	5	70	37	+33	47	
5	Vulcan Newton	34	13	10	11	70	65	+5	36	
6	Blackpool Mechanics	34	11	13	10	67	56	+11	35	
7	Bacup Borough	34	14	7	13	53	45	+8	35	
8	Atherton Collieries	34	12	11	11	55	57	−2	35	
9	Whitworth Valley	34	13	9	12	54	65	−11	35	
10	Nelson	34	7	16	11	49	56	−7	30	
11	Daisy Hill	34	10	10	14	47	58	−11	30	
12	Maghull	34	10	9	15	56	61	−5	29	
13	Ashton Town	34	12	5	17	53	73	−20	29	
14	Newton	34	8	12	14	59	62	−3	28	
15	Oldham Dew	34	10	8	16	48	61	−13	28	
16	Bolton ST	34	9	6	19	50	84	−34	24	
17	Wigan Rovers	34	5	7	22	35	72	−37	17	Resigned
18	Ashton Athletic	34	3	8	23	18	92	−74	14	

Source: NWCFL: Final Tables, Season 1982/83
Rules for classification: 1) points; 2) goal difference; 3) number of goals scored.
The points system until the 1990–91 season: 2 points for a win, 1 point for a draw and 0 points for losing.
(C) Champions; (P) Promoted

== League Challenge Cup ==
The 1982–83 League Challenge Cup was a knockout competition open to all clubs in the League. The winners were Darwen of Division One who defeated Division Two club Skelmersdale United 2–1 after extra time (1–1 at 90 minutes) in the replayed final at Darwen; the original match held at Bury F.C. finished 2–2 after extra time (1–1 at 90 minutes).

Semi-finals and Final

Semi-finals
Darwen (D1)	3
Warrington Town (D3)	0
Rossendale United (D2)	1
Skelmersdale United (D2)	4

Final
Darwen (D1)	2 (Note: After extra time, score at 90 minutes: 1–1. Played at Bury F.C.)	2 (Note: Replay: after extra time, score at 90 minutes: 1–1. Played at Darwen F.C.)
Skelmersdale United (D2)	2	1

Club's division appended to team name: (D1)=Division One; (D2)=Division Two; (D3)=Division Three
source: NWCFL: All Results, 1982/83 Season

== Reserves Section ==
Main honours for the 1982–83 season:

- Reserves Division
  - Winners: Curzon Ashton Reserves
  - Runners-up: Stalybridge Celtic Reserves
- Reserves Division Cup
  - Winners: Irlam Town Reserves
  - Runners-up: Warrington Town Reserves
