= Bolton St Thomas F.C. =

Association football club in England

Bolton ST F.C.
- Full name: Bolton St Thomas' Football Club
- Nickname: the Saints
- Founded: 1891
- Dissolved: 1986
- Ground: Holy Harbour
Home colours

Bolton St Thomas' Football Club - later referred to as Bolton ST - was an association football club from Halliwell, Bolton, England, active for most of the 20th century.

== History ==
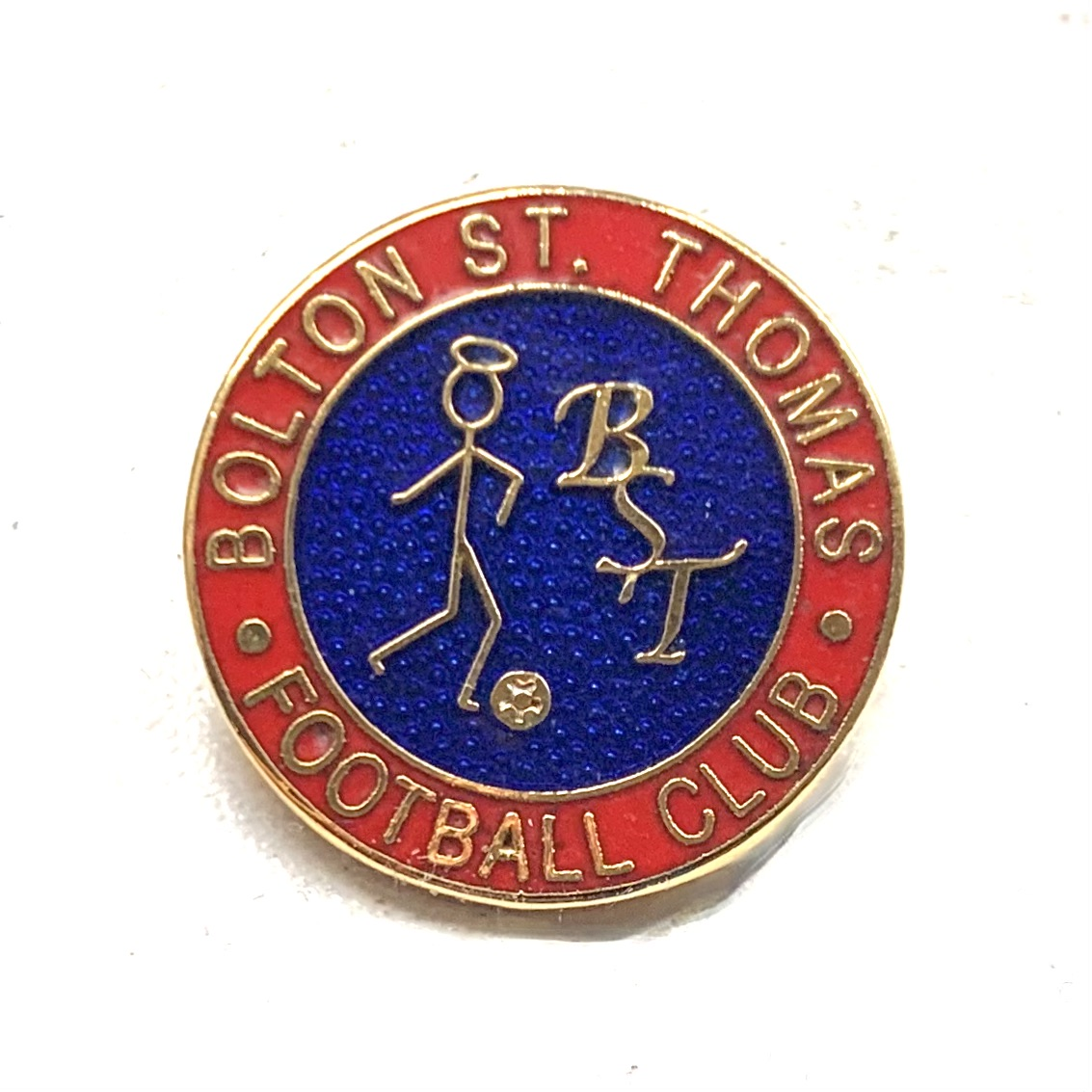
Bolton ST F.C. pin badge

The club was founded in 1891 as a church side, St Thomas's F.C., and played on a ground opposite the church. Originally it played in church football only, winning the Bolton Sunday School Social League Cup in 1937–38. The club had church representatives on its committee until 1983.

In 1981, after spending several years in the Bolton Combination, the club changed its name to Bolton ST, and joined the Lancashire Combination. The club started the season positively with a win over Wigan Rovers thanks to two goals from Richards, one of which was a penalty. It was a false dawn as the club lost the next 13 league matches. The club rallied to finish one above the bottom, and, when the Combination merged with the Cheshire County League to form the North West Counties Football League, the club was placed in the third and bottom division.

After three mediocre seasons, it enjoyed a more successful 1985–86 campaign, rising to 6th in the table. However, the club wound up in May 1986, after a falling-out between the club's former chairman and the church, which resulted in the church terminating the club's permission to play at Holy Harbour.

== Colours ==
The club's first colours as a Combination club were red and white stripes with black shorts, but by 1985 they were all red.

== Ground ==
The club played at Holy Harbour, just off Church Road.
