= 1981–82 Lancashire Combination =

Lancashire Combination
- Season: 1981–82
- Champions: Caernarfon Town

The 1981–82 Lancashire Combination was the last in the history of the Lancashire Combination, a football competition in England.

== League table ==
| Pos | Team | Pld | W | D | L | GF | GA | GD | Pts | Qualification or relegation |
|---|---|---|---|---|---|---|---|---|---|---|
| 1 | Caernarfon Town (C) | 34 | 23 | 8 | 3 | 71 | 27 | +44 | 54 | Placed in North West Counties League Division Two |
| 2 | Colne Dynamoes | 34 | 24 | 4 | 6 | 72 | 33 | +39 | 52 | Placed in North West Counties League Division Three |
| 3 | Nelson | 34 | 19 | 7 | 8 | 66 | 44 | +22 | 45 | Placed in North West Counties League Division Three |
| 4 | Wren Rovers | 34 | 18 | 7 | 9 | 67 | 47 | +20 | 43 | Placed in North West Counties League Division Two |
| 5 | Clitheroe | 34 | 13 | 16 | 5 | 67 | 40 | +27 | 42 | Placed in North West Counties League Division Three |
| 6 | Great Harwood Town | 34 | 16 | 8 | 10 | 61 | 47 | +14 | 40 | Placed in North West Counties League Division Two |
| 7 | Chadderton | 34 | 17 | 5 | 12 | 62 | 43 | +19 | 39 | Placed in North West Counties League Division Two |
| 8 | Blackpool Mechanics | 34 | 14 | 9 | 11 | 47 | 34 | +13 | 37 | Placed in North West Counties League Division Three |
| 9 | Vulcan Newton | 34 | 13 | 8 | 13 | 61 | 56 | +5 | 34 | Placed in North West Counties League Division Three |
| 10 | Padiham | 34 | 14 | 6 | 14 | 47 | 47 | 0 | 34 | Placed in North West Counties League Division Two |
| 11 | Lytham | 34 | 11 | 11 | 12 | 74 | 66 | +8 | 33 | Placed in North West Counties League Division Two |
| 12 | Oldham Dew | 34 | 12 | 6 | 16 | 48 | 61 | −13 | 30 | Placed in North West Counties League Division Three |
| 13 | Wigan Rovers | 34 | 11 | 7 | 16 | 44 | 53 | −9 | 29 | Placed in North West Counties League Division Three |
| 14 | Bacup Borough | 34 | 9 | 8 | 17 | 47 | 77 | −30 | 26 | Placed in North West Counties League Division Three |
| 15 | Whitworth Valley | 34 | 5 | 12 | 17 | 42 | 68 | −26 | 22 | Placed in North West Counties League Division Three |
| 16 | Daisy Hill | 34 | 5 | 9 | 20 | 31 | 64 | −33 | 19 | Placed in North West Counties League Division Three |
| 17 | Bolton ST | 34 | 7 | 4 | 23 | 40 | 86 | −46 | 18 | Placed in North West Counties League Division Three |
| 18 | Ashton Athletic | 34 | 4 | 7 | 23 | 22 | 76 | −54 | 15 | Placed in North West Counties League Division Three |

Rules for classification: 1) points; 2) goal difference; 3) number of goals scored.
The points system until the 1990–91 season: 2 points for a win, 1 point for a draw and 0 points for losing.
(C) Champions
