= 1983–84 North West Counties Football League =

North West Counties Football League
- Season: 1983–84

The 1983–84 North West Counties Football League was the second in the history of the North West Counties Football League, a football competition in England. The League comprised three divisions and there was additionally the League Challenge Cup knockout competition open to all clubs and a reserves team section.

== Division One ==
North West Counties Football League Division One
- Season: 1983–84
- Teams: 20
- Champions: Stalybridge Celtic
- Promoted: –
- Relegated: Ashton United; Darwen
- Matches: 380
- Goals: 1,187 (3.12 per match)

Division One featured 20 clubs, 17 remaining from the previous season plus 3 additional:

- Netherfield, relegated from the Northern Premier League
- Radcliffe Borough promoted as champions from Division Two
- Caernarfon Town promoted as runners-up from Division Two

No club took promotion after the season's end: the champions Stalybridge Celtic's application to join the Northern Premier League was unsuccessful. The bottom two clubs, Ashton United and Darwen, were relegated to Division Two.

=== League table ===
Pos	Team	Pld	W	D	L	GF	GA	GD	Pts	Season End Notes
1	Stalybridge Celtic (C)	38	26	8	4	81	30	+51	60	
2	Penrith	38	23	9	6	88	39	+49	55	
3	Radcliffe Borough	38	26	3	9	79	41	+38	55	
4	Burscough	38	22	8	8	87	47	+40	52	
5	Curzon Ashton	38	21	5	12	74	51	+23	47	
6	Lancaster City	38	21	3	14	76	56	+20	45	
7	Accrington Stanley	38	17	8	13	67	60	+7	42	
8	St Helens Town	38	17	7	14	69	55	+14	41	
9	Congleton Town	38	18	5	15	64	50	+14	41	
10	Prescot Cables	38	17	6	15	72	45	+27	40	
11	Leek Town	38	14	10	14	56	64	−8	38	
12	Winsford United	38	12	12	14	49	54	−5	36	
13	Formby	38	14	7	17	48	61	−13	35	
14	Caernarfon Town	38	11	12	15	46	55	−9	34	
15	Glossop	38	11	11	16	38	61	−23	33	
16	Bootle	38	11	7	20	46	69	−23	27 (Note: Bootle had 2 points deducted.)	
17	Leyland Motors	38	9	9	20	44	79	−35	27	
18	Netherfield	38	5	11	22	27	73	−46	21	
19	Ashton United (R)	38	7	9	22	47	86	−39	19 (Note: Ashton United had 4 points deducted.)	Relegated to Division Two
20	Darwen (R)	38	2	2	34	29	111	−82	6	Relegated to Division Two

Source: NWCFL: Final Tables, Season 1983/84
Rules for classification: The points system until the 1990–91 season: 2 points for a win, 1 point for a draw and 0 points for losing.
(C) Champions; (R) Relegated

== Division Two ==
North West Counties Football League Division Two
- Season: 1983–84
- Teams: 18
- Champions: Fleetwood Town
- Promoted: Fleetwood Town; Eastwood Hanley
- Relegated: Lytham
- Matches: 306
- Goals: 936 (3.06 per match)

Division Two featured 18 clubs, 15 remaining from the previous season plus 3 additional:

- Nantwich Town, relegated from Division One
- Colne Dynamoes promoted as champions from Division Three
- Warrington Town promoted as runners-up from Division Three

At the end of the season the two top clubs, the champions Fleetwood Town and runners-up Eastwood Hanley, were promoted to Division One. Thirteenth placed club Prescot BI were expelled from the league as the synthetic pitch at their ground was ruled unacceptable and fourteenth placed club Lytham were relegated to Division Three as their ground was ruled below the required standard for Division Two.

=== League table ===
Pos	Team	Pld	W	D	L	GF	GA	GD	Pts	Season End Notes
1	Fleetwood Town (C, P)	34	24	8	2	73	24	+49	56	Promoted to Division One
2	Eastwood Hanley (P)	34	21	6	7	69	35	+34	48	Promoted to Division One
3	Irlam Town	34	19	8	7	67	41	+26	46	
4	Warrington Town	34	18	7	9	65	45	+20	43	
5	Droylsden	34	19	5	10	59	42	+17	43	
6	Colne Dynamoes	34	16	9	9	55	37	+18	41	
7	Ellesmere Port & Neston	34	12	10	12	49	38	+11	34	
8	Chadderton	34	14	6	14	56	46	+10	34	
9	Atherton Laburnum Rovers	34	11	11	12	37	41	−4	33	
10	Wren Rovers	34	11	10	13	45	47	−2	32	
11	Skelmersdale United	34	13	6	15	60	63	−3	32	
12	Ford Motors	34	9	9	16	38	53	−15	27	
13	Prescot BI	34	9	9	16	50	66	−16	27	Expelled (synthetic pitch unacceptable)
14	Lytham (R)	34	13	3	18	56	81	−25	27 (Note: Lytham had 2 points deducted.)	Relegated (ground grading) to Division Three
15	Rossendale United	34	10	6	18	53	84	−31	26	
16	Great Harwood Town	34	5	12	17	36	60	−24	22	
17	Salford	34	5	11	18	24	60	−36	21	
18	Nantwich Town	34	8	2	24	44	73	−29	18	

Source: NWCFL: Final Tables, Season 1983/84
Rules for classification: The points system until the 1990–91 season: 2 points for a win, 1 point for a draw and 0 points for losing.
(C) Champions; (P) Promoted; (R) Relegated

== Division Three ==
North West Counties Football League Division Three
- Season: 1983–84
- Teams: 18
- Champions: Clitheroe
- Promoted: Clitheroe; Padiham
- Matches: 306
- Goals: 962 (3.14 per match)

Division Three featured 18 clubs, 15 from the previous season plus 3 additional:

- Padiham, relegated from Division Two
- Cheadle Town (formerly Grasmere Rovers), joined from the Manchester League
- Urmston Town, joined from the Manchester League

At the end of the season the two top clubs, the champions Clitheroe and runners-up Padiham, were promoted to Division Two. Ninth placed club Vulcan Newton were expelled from the league as their ground was ruled below the required standard.

=== League table ===
Pos	Team	Pld	W	D	L	GF	GA	GD	Pts	Season End Notes
1	Clitheroe (C, P)	34	22	7	5	79	29	+50	51	Promoted to Division Two
2	Padiham (P)	34	19	8	7	58	34	+24	46	Promoted to Division Two
3	Ashton Town	34	19	7	8	54	42	+12	45	
4	Oldham Dew	34	17	9	8	63	37	+26	43	
5	Daisy Hill	34	19	3	12	54	40	+14	41	
6	Maghull	34	16	8	10	60	50	+10	40	
7	Blackpool Mechanics	34	17	5	12	70	49	+21	39	
8	Atherton Collieries	34	14	9	11	54	50	+4	37	
9	Vulcan Newton	34	15	8	11	64	54	+10	36 (Note: Vulcan Newton and Prestwich Heys had 2 points deducted.)	Expelled (ground substandard)
10	Prestwich Heys	34	15	5	14	61	59	+2	33	
11	Whitworth Valley	34	11	8	15	45	53	−8	30	
12	Bolton ST	34	10	10	14	49	64	−15	30	
13	Bacup Borough	34	11	9	14	65	60	+5	27 (Note: Bacup Borough had 4 points deducted.)	
14	Nelson	34	8	10	16	49	55	−6	26	
15	Cheadle Town	34	9	8	17	39	67	−28	26	
16	Urmston Town	34	7	9	18	35	67	−32	23	
17	Newton	34	8	4	22	33	63	−30	20	
18	Ashton Athletic	34	4	3	27	30	89	−59	11	

Source: NWCFL: Final Tables, Season 1983/84
Rules for classification: The points system until the 1990–91 season: 2 points for a win, 1 point for a draw and 0 points for losing.
(C) Champions; (P) Promoted

== League Challenge Cup ==
The 1983–84 League Challenge Cup was a knockout competition open to all clubs in the League. The winners were Ellesmere Port & Neston of Division Two who defeated the season's Division One champions Stalybridge Celtic in the final, played at Bury F.C., 4–2 on penalties after the match finished 0–0 after extra time.

Semi-finals and Final

Semi-finals
Accrington Stanley (D1)	3 (Note: After extra time, score at 90 Minutes: 3–3)
Ellesmere Port & Neston (D2)	4
Stalybridge Celtic (D1)	1
Penrith (D1)	0

Final (Note: Played at Bury F.C.)
Ellesmere Port & Neston (D2)	0 (Note: After extra time)	4p (Note: Penalties)
Stalybridge Celtic (D1)	0	2p

Club's division appended to team name: (D1)=Division One; (D2)=Division Two
source: NWCFL: All Results, 1983/84 Season

== Reserves Section ==
Main honours for the 1983–84 season:

- Reserves Division
  - Winners: Irlam Town Reserves
  - Runners-up: Curzon Ashton Reserves
- Reserves Division Cup
  - Winners: Skelmersdale United Reserves
  - Runners-up: Curzon Ashton Reserves
