= 1983–84 Northern Premier League =

Northern Premier League
- Season: 1983–84
- Champions: Barrow
- Promoted: Barrow
- Relegated: none
- Matches: 462
- Goals: 1,390 (3.01 per match)

The 1983–84 Northern Premier League season was the 16th in the history of the Northern Premier League, a football competition in England.

== Overview ==
The League featured twenty-two clubs.

=== Team changes ===
The following four clubs left the League at the end of the previous season:

- Gateshead promoted to Alliance Premier League
- King's Lynn transferred to Southern League Premier Division
- Tamworth relegated to Southern League Midland Division
- Netherfield relegated to North West Counties League Division One

The following four clubs joined the League at the start of the season:

- Barrow relegated from Alliance Premier League
- Stafford Rangers relegated from Alliance Premier League
- Horwich RMI promoted from North West Counties League Division One
- Rhyl promoted from North West Counties League Division One

=== League table ===
Pos	Team	Pld	W	D	L	GF	GA	GD	Pts	Qualification or relegation
1	Barrow (C, P)	42	29	10	3	92	38	+54	97	Promoted to Alliance Premier League
2	Matlock Town	42	23	8	11	72	48	+24	77	
3	South Liverpool	42	22	11	9	55	44	+11	77	
4	Grantham	42	20	8	14	64	51	+13	68	
5	Burton Albion	42	17	13	12	61	47	+14	64	
6	Macclesfield Town	42	18	10	14	65	55	+10	64	
7	Rhyl	42	19	6	17	64	55	+9	63	
8	Horwich RMI	42	18	9	15	64	59	+5	63	
9	Gainsborough Trinity	42	17	11	14	82	66	+16	62	
10	Stafford Rangers	42	15	17	10	65	52	+13	62	
11	Hyde United	42	17	8	17	61	63	−2	59	
12	Marine	42	16	10	16	63	68	−5	58	
13	Witton Albion	42	14	14	14	64	57	+7	56	
14	Chorley	42	14	11	17	68	65	+3	53	
15	Workington	42	14	9	19	53	57	−4	51	
16	Southport	42	14	8	20	57	74	−17	50	
17	Worksop Town	42	13	8	21	57	74	−17	47	
18	Goole Town	42	12	10	20	59	80	−21	46	
19	Morecambe	42	11	12	19	59	75	−16	45	
20	Oswestry Town	42	11	8	23	66	97	−31	41	
21	Buxton	42	11	6	25	52	91	−39	39	
22	Mossley	42	9	9	24	47	74	−27	33 (Note: Mossley had 3 points deducted.)	

Rules for classification: The points system: 3 points for a win, 1 point for a draw and 0 points for losing.
(C) Champions; (P) Promoted

== Results ==
Home \ Away	BRW	BRT	BUX	CHO	GAI	GOO	GRN	HOR	HYD	MAC	MAR	MAT	MOR	MOS	OSW	RHL	SLI	SOU	STA	WTN	WRK	WKS
Barrow		5–0	2–0	2–2	3–0	4–3	1–0	2–0	2–2	2–0	4–0	3–0	4–1	3–1	4–0	1–0	2–1	5–1	1–1	2–2	3–1	2–1
Burton Albion	0–0		4–1	2–4	0–2	0–0	0–2	1–2	1–2	0–2	1–2	3–0	1–0	1–1	4–0	2–1	0–1	3–1	2–2	2–0	3–0	4–1
Buxton	1–2	0–1		1–0	1–4	1–2	1–0	0–2	0–1	1–3	2–2	0–1	3–3	2–3	1–0	1–2	0–1	3–2	2–2	1–0	3–1	0–2
Chorley	0–2	0–2	4–0		3–4	4–1	1–3	2–2	1–1	4–2	0–2	4–4	2–1	1–0	3–2	0–1	1–1	1–2	1–1	0–0	1–3	1–2
Gainsborough Trinity	1–2	1–1	3–2	1–1		0–1	3–1	0–2	4–1	2–2	2–2	1–1	1–1	4–1	5–1	1–1	5–0	1–1	3–1	1–1	3–1	6–2
Goole Town	2–3	0–0	2–2	0–0	6–3		3–1	2–0	2–4	0–2	1–1	2–3	2–2	0–0	3–3	1–4	1–2	3–1	2–0	2–5	0–2	2–0
Grantham Town	1–1	1–2	4–2	1–1	2–1	2–0		2–1	1–3	2–1	4–0	0–1	1–0	2–1	0–1	4–0	1–1	3–0	0–1	4–1	0–0	5–3
Horwich RMI	0–0	0–0	3–0	3–4	2–1	4–0	1–2		2–1	1–1	1–0	0–1	3–1	2–0	4–2	0–3	1–1	2–1	2–1	1–1	1–0	2–3
Hyde United	0–0	0–0	3–1	4–1	1–2	2–1	2–1	2–0		2–0	0–2	0–2	3–1	1–3	2–0	2–4	0–2	0–3	0–1	2–2	1–2	2–0
Macclesfield Town	1–3	2–0	1–2	3–1	0–2	1–2	2–2	2–2	1–3		4–1	2–2	1–0	2–0	2–1	3–1	2–1	2–0	2–2	2–0	2–1	1–0
Marine	2–3	1–3	2–2	0–3	3–1	4–1	2–0	0–1	5–2	2–1		1–1	1–1	2–1	0–1	1–1	1–1	5–2	2–2	1–3	1–0	1–2
Matlock Town	1–2	1–1	2–1	0–1	3–1	5–2	0–0	1–0	2–2	2–1	0–1		2–0	3–0	4–1	3–1	2–3	1–0	3–0	0–1	2–0	1–0
Morecambe	2–1	1–1	4–0	1–2	1–2	1–4	1–0	1–1	2–0	1–1	4–1	2–0		1–0	2–1	0–1	1–3	1–2	0–0	2–2	2–2	5–1
Mossley	1–1	1–1	2–4	1–4	0–2	2–0	1–1	1–2	0–1	1–1	3–0	0–5	5–1		1–0	0–2	0–0	2–2	2–3	2–0	1–2	0–3
Oswestry Town	3–0	2–3	3–3	2–1	2–1	2–1	0–2	0–6	2–2	2–0	0–4	1–1	4–4	0–2		5–2	0–1	2–3	1–4	3–3	3–0	1–4
Rhyl	0–1	2–4	1–2	1–0	0–0	1–0	2–3	3–0	2–0	1–2	0–2	2–1	6–1	1–2	3–1		3–0	0–0	1–2	2–1	3–1	1–0
South Liverpool	3–0	0–0	2–0	0–2	2–1	1–1	1–1	1–0	1–1	1–0	2–1	1–2	2–1	1–0	1–0	2–1		4–2	4–3	1–0	1–0	0–0
Southport	1–3	2–0	0–1	0–4	2–1	1–2	0–1	2–2	2–1	2–0	3–0	1–2	0–2	4–2	3–3	3–0	1–0		1–1	2–1	1–1	1–1
Stafford Rangers	1–1	1–1	1–2	0–0	3–1	4–0	4–0	3–1	0–2	1–3	1–2	2–1	4–0	3–2	1–4	2–1	1–1	4–0		1–1	0–0	0–0
Witton Albion	1–3	2–1	4–1	2–1	3–1	0–2	1–2	7–1	2–0	1–1	3–1	2–3	1–1	1–1	2–1	0–0	0–1	2–1	0–0		2–1	2–0
Workington	1–3	0–1	6–1	2–1	0–1	0–0	4–1	3–1	1–2	0–3	1–1	2–0	2–0	1–0	3–4	0–2	4–2	2–0	0–0	1–1		0–0
Worksop Town	0–4	1–5	4–1	3–1	3–3	3–0	0–1	1–3	2–1	1–1	0–1	1–3	2–3	4–1	2–2	1–1	2–1	0–1	0–1	2–1	0–2	

Updated to match(es) played on 5 May 1984. Source: Northern Premier Division results grid
Legend: Blue = home team win; Yellow = draw; Red = away team win.

== Cup Results ==
Challenge Cup:

- South Liverpool 1–1 (7–6 Pens) Hyde United

President's Cup:

- Workington bt. Marine

Northern Premier League Shield: Between Champions of NPL Premier Division and Winners of the NPL Cup.

- Barrow bt. South Liverpool

== End of the season ==
At the end of the sixteenth season of the Northern Premier League, Barrow applied to join the Alliance Premier League and were successful.

=== Promotion and relegation ===
The following club left the League at the end of the season:

- Barrow promoted to Alliance Premier League

The following club joined the League the following season:

- Bangor City relegated from Alliance Premier League
