= Kevin Barnes (footballer) =

English footballer

Personal information
- Full name: Kevin Barnes
- Date of birth: 12 September 1975 (age 51)
- Place of birth: Fleetwood, England
- Position: Striker

Senior career*
Years	Team	Apps	(Gls)
1998–1999	Fleetwood Town		
1999	Blackpool	4	(0)
1999–2000	Fleetwood Town		
2000–2001	Lancaster City		
2001–2003	Kendal Town		
2003–2005	Fleetwood Town		
- * Club domestic league appearances and goals

Kevin Barnes (born 12 September 1975) is an English former professional footballer who played as a striker. He played four matches in the Football League Second Division for Blackpool.
