= 1973–74 Northern Premier League =

Northern Premier League
- Season: 1973–74
- Champions: Boston United
- Promoted: None
- Relegated: none
- Matches: 552
- Goals: 1,479 (2.68 per match)
- Biggest home win: Wigan Athletic 7–0 Matlock Town (8 September 1973) Wigan Athletic 7–0 Great Harwood (22 September 1973) Gainsborough Trinity 7–0 Fleetwood (26 April 1974)
- Biggest away win: Bradford Park Avenue 1–7 Stafford Rangers (8 September 1973) Bradford Park Avenue 0–6 South Shields (18 September 1973) Morecambe 0–6 South Shields (2 May 1974)
- Highest scoring: Bradford Park Avenue 1–7 Stafford Rangers (8 September 1973) Runcorn 6–2 Mossley (8 October 1973); Wigan Athletic 5–3 Northwich Victoria (10 November 1973); South Shields 7–1 Morecambe (17 November 1973); Lancaster City 7–1 Goole Town (22 December 1973); South Liverpool 5–3 Northwich Victoria (3 March 1974) Goole Town 7–1 Morecambe (20 April 1974)
- Longest winning run: 10 matches Stafford Rangers (24 November 1973 – 9 February 1974)
- Longest unbeaten run: 17 matches Scarborough (21 August 1973 – 20 October 1973)
- Longest winless run: 17 matches Bradford Park Avenue (11 August 1973 – 27 October 1973); Mossley (8 October 1973 – 26 January 1974)
- Longest losing run: 7 matches Netherfield (9 February 1974 – 16 March 1974)

The 1973–74 Northern Premier League was the sixth season of the Northern Premier League, a regional football league in Northern England, the northern areas of the Midlands and North Wales. The season began on 11 August 1973 and concluded on 9 May 1974.

== Overview ==
=== Team changes ===
The following club left the League at the end of the previous season:

- Ellesmere Port Town resigned, demoted to Lancashire Combination

The following club joined the League at the start of the season:

- Buxton promoted from Cheshire County League

=== League table ===
Pos	Team	Pld	W	D	L	GF	GA	GR	Pts	Qualification or relegation
1	Boston United (C)	46	27	11	8	69	32	2.156	65	
2	Wigan Athletic	46	28	8	10	96	39	2.462	64	
3	Altrincham	46	26	11	9	77	34	2.265	63	
4	Stafford Rangers	46	27	9	10	101	45	2.244	63	
5	Scarborough	46	22	14	10	62	43	1.442	58	
6	South Shields	46	25	6	15	87	48	1.813	56	
7	Runcorn	46	21	14	11	72	47	1.532	56	
8	Macclesfield Town	46	18	15	13	48	47	1.021	51	
9	Bangor City	46	19	11	16	65	56	1.161	49	
10	Gainsborough Trinity	46	18	11	17	77	64	1.203	47	
11	South Liverpool	46	16	15	15	55	47	1.170	47	
12	Skelmersdale United	46	16	13	17	50	59	0.847	45	
13	Goole Town	46	14	15	17	60	69	0.870	43	
14	Fleetwood	46	14	15	17	48	68	0.706	43	
15	Northwich Victoria	46	14	13	19	68	75	0.907	41	
16	Mossley	46	15	11	20	53	65	0.815	41	
17	Morecambe	46	13	13	20	62	84	0.738	39	
18	Buxton	46	14	10	22	45	71	0.634	38	
19	Matlock Town	46	11	14	21	50	79	0.633	36	
20	Great Harwood	46	10	14	22	52	74	0.703	34	
21	Bradford Park Avenue	46	9	15	22	42	84	0.500	33	Club Folded
22	Barrow	46	13	7	26	46	94	0.489	33	
23	Lancaster City	46	10	12	24	52	67	0.776	32	
24	Netherfield	46	11	5	30	42	88	0.477	27	

Updated to match(es) played on 9 May 1974. Source: The Football Archives
Rules for classification: 1) points; 2) goal average; 3) number of goals scored.

The system of using goal average to separate two teams tied on points was used up until the 1976–77 season.

The points system up until the 1982–83 season: 2 points for a win, 1 point for a draw and 0 points for losing.
(C) Champions

=== Results ===
Home \ Away	ALT	BAN	BRW	BOS	BPA	BUX	FLE	GAI	GOO	GHA	LNC	MAC	MAT	MOR	MOS	NET	NOR	RUN	SCA	SKU	SLI	SSH	STA	WIG
Altrincham		4–0	3–0	2–0	4–1	6–0	1–0	1–1	4–2	3–1	0–0	0–1	1–0	1–0	1–0	4–0	1–1	3–0	1–1	3–0	2–1	1–1	1–0	3–0
Bangor City	1–0		2–0	4–0	0–2	1–0	0–1	3–0	1–0	3–2	1–0	0–1	1–1	2–4	0–0	1–2	5–2	1–1	2–0	4–0	2–0	2–1	0–2	1–2
Barrow	0–3	1–3		0–0	1–0	1–0	1–2	0–2	0–1	3–1	2–0	1–0	1–0	1–1	0–3	3–1	1–4	2–2	2–0	2–5	2–2	1–2	1–0	0–3
Boston United	1–1	2–1	4–1		1–1	1–0	2–0	0–1	0–0	1–1	1–1	3–0	4–1	2–0	4–1	2–0	2–0	2–0	1–0	3–0	4–2	4–1	1–0	2–2
Bradford Park Avenue	0–0	0–3	3–1	0–1		2–1	1–0	1–1	1–3	1–0	1–0	2–0	2–1	0–1	1–1	2–0	2–2	1–1	0–3	1–4	0–2	0–6	1–7	0–0
Buxton	0–3	0–0	2–0	1–1	3–1		1–1	1–1	1–1	2–1	2–1	1–2	2–2	1–4	1–1	1–0	1–0	0–1	2–1	2–0	1–1	0–1	2–0	0–4
Fleetwood Town	0–2	1–1	2–2	0–0	3–1	2–0		1–1	2–3	0–0	1–0	0–0	0–0	1–1	3–0	3–0	2–2	0–3	0–3	1–1	1–0	1–2	1–1	2–1
Gainsborough Trinity	0–1	2–2	0–1	0–1	4–0	3–2	7–0		4–3	1–1	1–1	0–1	0–0	4–1	1–4	4–0	5–0	0–3	1–1	1–0	4–0	3–1	3–2	2–1
Goole Town	0–2	0–1	4–1	0–1	2–2	1–4	1–1	1–0		0–0	1–0	0–0	2–2	7–1	2–0	2–1	2–0	1–2	0–2	0–1	0–0	3–2	2–3	2–1
Great Harwood	1–2	1–2	1–1	1–1	1–0	4–2	4–2	1–2	2–1		2–1	1–1	4–0	0–1	1–4	2–4	0–1	1–1	0–0	1–1	0–0	2–2	0–1	1–1
Lancaster City	1–2	1–1	4–2	0–1	1–1	3–0	1–2	2–2	7–1	3–1		1–1	2–1	3–1	2–1	0–0	4–2	0–0	2–0	2–0	0–0	0–1	1–3	1–4
Macclesfield Town	1–1	1–1	3–2	0–2	1–0	1–0	1–0	1–0	2–2	0–1	0–0		1–1	3–0	1–0	0–0	2–2	1–2	2–2	2–0	3–0	1–0	2–1	0–0
Matlock Town	1–2	2–2	1–0	2–1	1–1	2–0	0–3	4–3	1–1	1–0	3–0	2–1		2–0	0–1	3–1	1–1	2–2	1–2	0–0	2–0	0–2	2–0	2–3
Morecambe	2–2	3–0	3–0	0–2	1–1	0–0	0–2	3–2	4–1	3–3	2–0	3–0	2–2		2–2	5–0	1–3	2–2	0–0	1–2	2–2	0–6	1–3	0–2
Mossley	2–1	0–1	1–2	1–2	2–2	0–1	1–1	2–1	3–0	3–1	2–1	0–1	2–0	1–1		2–0	1–0	0–1	0–0	1–1	0–1	2–4	0–3	0–3
Netherfield	4–1	1–2	1–2	0–3	2–1	1–1	6–1	0–2	0–0	1–3	1–0	1–2	2–1	0–2	0–2		1–2	2–1	0–1	1–2	0–0	1–2	1–5	1–0
Northwich Victoria	1–2	1–1	5–0	0–1	2–2	1–2	1–3	0–2	1–1	2–1	4–2	1–0	4–2	0–0	0–1	5–1		0–2	1–0	1–1	1–0	3–1	1–1	1–2
Runcorn	2–1	2–1	2–0	0–0	2–0	1–2	1–0	1–2	2–2	0–1	3–1	2–0	0–0	4–0	6–2	3–0	1–1		1–1	1–2	2–1	3–1	1–2	0–1
Scarborough	2–0	1–1	0–0	2–1	1–0	2–1	5–0	3–1	1–1	1–0	1–0	3–2	4–0	1–0	2–2	4–1	2–1	1–3		0–2	1–1	2–1	0–1	1–0
Skelmersdale United	1–0	3–1	3–0	0–1	2–2	0–1	0–0	1–1	2–0	1–0	2–2	0–0	4–1	0–2	0–2	0–3	0–2	1–1	1–2		1–0	2–0	1–1	2–1
South Liverpool	2–0	1–0	4–0	0–1	1–1	4–1	0–1	4–0	1–2	2–0	3–1	0–0	2–0	2–0	2–0	1–0	5–3	0–2	1–1	3–1		1–0	2–2	0–0
South Shields	0–0	2–0	6–1	1–0	1–0	1–0	3–1	2–0	2–0	0–2	3–0	3–1	1–0	7–1	4–0	0–1	0–0	3–1	6–0	0–0	2–0		1–3	0–2
Stafford Rangers	1–1	4–3	1–3	3–2	6–0	2–0	5–0	3–1	0–1	5–1	2–0	4–1	5–0	2–1	0–0	2–0	3–0	1–1	0–2	4–0	1–1	1–1		3–0
Wigan Athletic	1–0	2–1	4–1	1–0	4–1	5–0	2–0	3–1	1–1	7–0	2–0	2–4	7–0	3–0	4–0	3–0	5–3	2–0	0–0	2–0	0–0	2–1	1–2	

Updated to match(es) played on 9 May 1974. Source: The Football Archives
Legend: Blue = home team win; Yellow = draw; Red = away team win.

=== Stadia and locations ===
Locations of the 1973–74 Northern Premier League teams

Team	Stadium
Altrincham	Moss Lane
Bangor City	Farrar Road
Barrow	Holker Street
Boston United	York Street
Bradford Park Avenue	Park Avenue
Buxton	The Silverlands
Fleetwood	Highbury
Gainsborough Trinity	The Northolme
Goole Town	Victoria Pleasure Ground
Great Harwood	The Showground
Lancaster City	Great Axe
Macclesfield Town	Moss Rose
Matlock Town	Causeway Lane
Morecambe	Christie Park
Mossley	Seel Park
Netherfield	Parkside
Northwich Victoria	Drill Field
Runcorn	Canal Street
Scarborough	Athletic Ground
Skelmersdale United	White Moss Park
South Liverpool	Holly Park
South Shields	Simonside Hall
Stafford Rangers	Marston Road
Wigan Athletic	Springfield Park

== Cup results ==
=== Challenge Cup ===
Stage	Home team	Score	Away team
1st Leg	Boston United	?–?	Altrincham
2nd Leg	Altrincham	?–?	Boston United
Aggregate	Boston United	4–3	Altrincham

=== Northern Premier League Shield ===
Between Champions of NPL Premier Division and Winners of the NPL Cup.

Home team	Score	Away team
Wigan Athletic	beat	Boston United

=== FA Cup ===
Out of the twenty-four clubs from the Northern Premier League, only three teams reached for the second round:

Second Round

Home team	Score	Away team	
Blackburn Rovers	0–0	Altrincham	
Altrincham	0–2	Blackburn Rovers	Replay
Boston United	1–0	Hitchin Town	
Port Vale	2–1	Scarborough	

Third Round

Home team	Score	Away team	
Derby County	0–0	Boston United	
Boston United	1–6	Derby County	Replay

=== FA Trophy ===
Out of the twenty-four clubs from the Northern Premier League, four teams reached for the fourth round:

Fourth Round

Home team	Score	Away team	
Bedford Town	0–1	Morecambe	
Stafford Rangers	0–0	Macclesfield Town	
Macclesfield Town	2–0	Stafford Rangers	Replay
South Shields	0–0	Worcester City	
Worcester City	0–2	South Shields	Replay

Semi-finals

Stage	Home team	Score	Away team
1st Leg	Macclesfield Town	0–0	Dartford
2nd Leg	Dartford	2–1	Macclesfield Town
Aggregate	Dartford	2–1	Macclesfield Town
1st Leg	South Shields	0–1	Morecambe
2nd Leg	Morecambe	2–0	South Shields
Aggregate	Morecambe	3–0	South Shields

Final

Home team	Score	Away team
Morecambe	2–1	Dartford

== End of the season ==
At the end of the sixth season of the Northern Premier League none of the teams put forward for election received enough votes to be promoted to the Football League. Bradford Park Avenue folded.

=== Football League elections ===
Alongside the four Football League teams facing re-election, a total of seven non-League teams applied for election, one of which were from the Northern Premier League. All four Football League teams were re-elected.

Club	League	Votes
Doncaster Rovers	Football League	46
Stockport County	Football League	38
Crewe Alexandra	Football League	37
Workington	Football League	21
Kettering Town	Southern League	16
Yeovil Town	Southern League	14
Wigan Athletic	Northern Premier League	10
Chelmsford City	Southern League	8
Nuneaton Borough	Southern League	1
Telford United	Southern League	1
Cambridge City	Southern League	0

=== Promotion and relegation ===
The following club left the League at the end of the season:

- Bradford Park Avenue folded

The following club joined the League the following season:

- Worksop Town promoted from Midland League (1889) (returning after a five year's absence)
