= 1981–82 Cheshire County Football League =

Cheshire County League
- Season: 1981–82

The 1981–82 Cheshire County Football League was the 58th and last in the history of the Cheshire County League, a football competition in England, most clubs are transferred to the newly formed North West Counties Football League. Teams were divided into two divisions.

== Division One ==
Cheshire County Football League Division One
- Season: 1981–82
- Champions: Hyde United
- Promoted: Hyde United; Chorley

The division featured two new teams, both promoted from last season's Division Two:

- Accrington Stanley (1st)
- Glossop (2nd)

=== League table ===
Pos	Team	Pld	W	D	L	GF	GA	GD	Pts	Promotion or qualification
1	Hyde United (C, P)	38	27	8	3	91	34	+57	62	Promotion to 1982–83 Northern Premier League
2	Chorley (P)	38	23	9	6	70	34	+36	55	Promotion to 1982–83 Northern Premier League
3	Burscough	38	21	10	7	70	39	+31	52	Joined 1982–83 NWCL Division One
4	Winsford United	38	21	9	8	68	43	+25	51	Joined 1982–83 NWCL Division One
5	Rossendale United	38	18	10	10	62	44	+18	46	Joined 1982–83 NWCL Division Two
6	Glossop	38	13	19	6	52	30	+22	45	Joined 1982–83 NWCL Division One
7	Darwen	38	16	10	12	63	62	+1	40 (Note: Deducted 2 points)	Joined 1982–83 NWCL Division One
8	Curzon Ashton	38	12	15	11	57	50	+7	39	Joined 1982–83 NWCL Division One
9	Prescot Cables	38	16	8	14	51	45	+6	38	Joined 1982–83 NWCL Division One
10	Stalybridge Celtic	38	14	9	15	71	66	+5	37	Joined 1982–83 NWCL Division One
11	Fleetwood Town	38	12	13	13	42	55	−13	37	Joined 1982–83 NWCL Division Two
12	Formby	38	12	11	15	42	55	−13	35	Joined 1982–83 NWCL Division One
13	Accrington Stanley	38	11	11	16	40	57	−17	33	Joined 1982–83 NWCL Division One
14	Nantwich Town	38	10	13	15	48	49	−1	31	Joined 1982–83 NWCL Division One
15	Leek Town	38	10	11	17	39	45	−6	31	Joined 1982–83 NWCL Division One
16	Horwich RMI	38	12	7	19	58	72	−14	31	Joined 1982–83 NWCL Division One
17	Bootle	38	11	12	15	49	47	+2	30 (Note: Deducted 4 points)	Joined 1982–83 NWCL Division One
18	St Helens Town	38	7	11	20	34	71	−37	25	Joined 1982–83 NWCL Division One
19	Ashton United	38	8	6	24	38	77	−39	22	Joined 1982–83 NWCL Division One
20	Droylsden	38	3	4	31	26	96	−70	10	Joined 1982–83 NWCL Division Two

Rules for classification: 1) points; 2) goal difference; 3) number of goals scored.
The points system until the 1990–91 season: 2 points for a win, 1 point for a draw and 0 points for losing.
(C) Champions; (P) Promoted

== Division Two ==
Cheshire County Football League Division Two
- Season: 1981–82
- Champions: Congleton Town

The division featured three new teams:

- Two relegated from last seasons Division One:
  - Kirkby Town (19th)
  - New Mills (20th)
- One joined the division:
  - Ellesmere Port & Neston

=== League table ===
Pos	Team	Pld	W	D	L	GF	GA	GD	Pts	Qualification
1	Congleton Town (C)	38	25	9	4	67	20	+47	59	Joined 1982–83 NWCL Division One
2	Rhyl	38	24	10	4	84	29	+55	58	Joined 1982–83 NWCL Division One
3	Irlam Town	38	23	10	5	67	27	+40	56	Joined 1982–83 NWCL Division Two
4	Leyland Motors	38	19	14	5	79	45	+34	52	Joined 1982–83 NWCL Division One
5	Maghull	38	20	7	11	64	48	+16	47	Joined 1982–83 NWCL Division Three
6	Radcliffe Borough	38	18	7	13	64	39	+25	43	Joined 1982–83 NWCL Division Two
7	Kirkby Town	38	17	9	12	53	42	+11	43	Joined 1982–83 NWCL Division Two
8	Warrington Town	38	17	8	13	52	35	+17	42	Joined 1982–83 NWCL Division Three
9	Eastwood Hanley	38	16	9	13	62	51	+11	39 (Note: Deducted 2 points)	Joined 1982–83 NWCL Division Two
10	Middlewich Athletic	38	15	11	12	42	34	+8	39	Did not join North West Counties League
11	Atherton Laburnum Rovers	38	14	11	13	46	46	0	39	Joined 1982–83 NWCL Division Two
12	Ford Motors	38	13	10	15	48	59	−11	36	Joined 1982–83 NWCL Division Two
13	Prescot BI	38	14	7	17	64	70	−6	35	Joined 1982–83 NWCL Division Two
14	Ellesmere Port & Neston	38	13	6	19	43	55	−12	32	Joined 1982–83 NWCL Division Two
15	Skelmersdale United	38	13	5	20	32	49	−17	29	Joined 1982–83 NWCL Division Two
16	Salford	38	9	6	23	34	65	−31	24	Joined 1982–83 NWCL Division Two
17	Atherton Collieries	38	8	7	23	41	85	−44	23	Joined 1982–83 NWCL Division Three
18	Ashton Town	38	6	9	23	40	76	−36	21	Joined 1982–83 NWCL Division Three
19	New Mills	38	6	8	24	31	93	−62	20	Joined 1982–83 NWCL Division Two
20	Prestwich Heys	38	5	7	26	30	75	−45	15	Joined 1982–83 NWCL Division Three

Rules for classification: 1) points; 2) goal difference; 3) number of goals scored.
The points system until the 1990–91 season: 2 points for a win, 1 point for a draw and 0 points for losing.
(C) Champions
