= 1981–82 Northern Football League =

English football league season

The 1981–82 Northern Football League season was the 84th in the history of Northern Football League, a football competition in England. At the end of the season the Northern League expanded to two divisions for the first time since 1899–1900.

== Clubs ==
Northern Football League
- Season: 1981–82
- Champions: Blyth Spartans
- Matches: 380
- Goals: 1,190 (3.13 per match)

Division One featured 20 clubs which competed in the league last season, no new clubs joined the division this season.

=== League table ===
Pos	Team	Pld	W	D	L	GF	GA	GD	Pts	Promotion or relegation
1	Blyth Spartans	38	25	8	5	77	31	+46	83	
2	Whitby Town	38	23	11	4	64	21	+43	80	
3	South Bank	38	20	7	11	72	44	+28	67	
4	Tow Law Town	38	18	8	12	76	58	+18	62	
5	Spennymoor United	38	16	13	9	59	37	+22	61	
6	Billingham Synthonia	38	17	9	12	57	46	+11	60	
7	Bishop Auckland	38	17	8	13	63	51	+12	59	
8	Durham City	38	17	5	16	75	67	+8	56	
9	Shildon	38	16	8	14	57	53	+4	56	
10	North Shields	38	14	13	11	67	61	+6	55	
11	Ferryhill Athletic	38	16	6	16	57	59	−2	54	
12	Horden Colliery Welfare	38	15	6	17	55	58	−3	51	
13	Crook Town	38	15	6	17	60	69	−9	51	
14	Evenwood Town	38	13	9	16	57	66	−9	48	
15	Penrith	38	13	10	15	63	66	−3	49	Transferred to the North West Counties League
16	Consett	38	10	10	18	46	64	−18	40	
17	West Auckland Town	38	9	10	19	42	67	−25	37	
18	Ashington	38	9	8	21	50	87	−37	35	
19	Whitley Bay	38	8	7	23	47	83	−36	31	
20	Willington	38	3	10	25	46	102	−56	19	

Source: fchd
Rules for classification: 1) points; 2) goal difference; 3) number of goals scored.
