= Wincham Park =

Football stadium in England

Coordinates: 53°16′13.70″N 2°29′19.38″W

- U Lock It Stadium
- Match between Witton Albion and Ramsbottom United at Wincham Park (2015)
- Interactive map of Wincham Park
- Location: Heath Lane, Wincham, Northwich, Cheshire, England
- Capacity: 4,813 (600 seated)
- Surface: Grass

Construction
- Opened: 1989

Tenants
- Witton Albion; Northwich Victoria (2002–2005 & 2015–2017 & 2018-2023); Runcorn Linnets (2006–2010)

Wincham Park is a football stadium in Wincham, a parish on the edge of Northwich, England. The home ground of Witton Albion, it first opened in 1989, after the club left their former Central Ground. Capacity is 4,813, with 600 covered seats on the north side of the stadium. The other three sides of the ground are all standing: the Lostock End, Wincham End, and Popular Side. It has a small club museum at the Lostock end, which is unusual in itself.

Wincham Park has not changed much since its construction although cover was added at both ends of the stadium in 1990. The floodlights were replaced in 2010 after supporters walked to nearby Runcorn to raise the funds. The record attendance for a match at Wincham Park was when Witton played Kidderminster Harriers in the semi-final of the 1990/91 F.A Trophy, when 3,940 watched Albion force a replay in extra-time.

The stadium has had a number of names due to sponsorship deals; these include Britannia Carpets Stadium, Bargain Booze Stadium and its current name, the 'U Lock It Stadium'.

Wincham Park's former name of The Bargain Booze Stadium was discussed on the popular BBC1 TV show Room 101 hosted by Frank Skinner.

Local rivals Northwich Victoria and Runcorn Linnets have ground-shared at Wincham Park. 1874 Northwich have also used the stadium to stage one-off matches.

Northwich Victoria and Witton Albion shared Wincham Park whilst both clubs played in the Evo-Stik League First Division North. It is currently used in the NPL West by Witton and the Midland Football League Premier Division by Northwich Victoria - who have just been moved across from the NWCFL Premier.
