= Kendal Town F.C. =

Association football club in England

Coordinates: 54°19′13.44″N 2°44′11.48″W

Kendal Town
- Full name: Kendal Town Football Club
- Nicknames: The Mintcakes, The Field, The Town
- Founded: 1919
- Ground: Parkside Road, Kendal
- Manager: Matt Flynn
- League: Northern League Division One
- 2025–26: Northern League Division One, 7th of 19
Home colours	Away colours

Kendal Town Football Club is a football club based in Kendal, Cumbria, England. The club are currently members of the Northern League Division One and play at Parkside Road.

== History ==
The club was established in 1919 by employees of the Netherfield Somervell Brothers factory and was initially named Netherfield. They won the Westmorland County Cup in 1924–25. They joined the West Lancashire League in 1936, where the club remained until World War II. In 1945 they joined the Lancashire Combination, finishing as runners-up in their first season. The season also saw them reach the first round of the FA Cup for the first time, losing 3–2 on aggregate to Barrow. When the league gained a second division in 1947 the club were placed in Division One, which they won in 1948–49, a season which saw another FA Cup first round appearance, this time losing 3–0 at Gateshead.

Netherfield went one better the following season, beating North Shields 4–3 in the first round, before losing 6–0 at Watford in the second. In the 1952–53 FA Cup the club lost 3–0 to Gainsborough Trinity in a first round replay. They were league runners-up again in 1953–54 and another FA Cup first round appearance the following season ended with a 4–0 defeat to Wrexham in a replay. In the 1955–56 FA Cup the club lost 5–1 at home to Grimsby Town in the first round in front of a record crowd of 5,184. Later that season they won the Lancashire Combination Cup. The club won the Cup again in 1960–61 and were league runners-up the following season. Another FA Cup run in 1963–64 saw them beat Loughborough United 6–1 in the first round, before losing 4–1 to Chesterfield in a second round replay. The following season they lost 3–1 at home to Barnsley in the first round.

The Lancashire Combination title was won by Netherfield for a second time in 1964–65, and their consistent form led to them becoming founder members of the Northern Premier League in 1968. However, after their success in the Lancashire Combination, the club struggled in the new league; the league's first season ended with them finishing in the bottom half of the table for the first time since World War II. They went on to finish bottom of the table in 1973–74 and again in 1981–82 and 1982–83. As a result, the club dropped into Division One of the North West Counties League, which had been formed by a merger of the Lancashire Combination and the Cheshire County League. The club continued to struggle, only avoiding relegation to Division Two in their first season in the league after Ashton United were given a points deduction. After finishing in the bottom four of Division One for the next three seasons, the club were founder members of Division One of the Northern Premier League in 1987.

Although Netherfield finished bottom of the new division in their first season, they were not relegated. They were renamed Netherfield Kendal in 1998, before adopting their current name two years later when Kendal's shoe making industry closed. In 2005–06 the club finished third in Division One, qualifying for the promotion play-offs. After beating Stocksbridge Park Steels 4–2 on penalties after a 1–1 draw, they defeated Gresley Rovers 2–1 in the final to earn promotion to the Premier Division.

In 2008–09 a fifth-place finish in the Premier Division saw Kendal Town enter the play-offs for a place in the Conference North; however, they lost 4–3 to Ilkeston Town in the semi-finals. Another fifth-place finish the following season led to another play-off campaign, this time losing 2–1 to Bradford Park Avenue in the semi-finals. In 2012–13 the club finished second-from-bottom of the Premier Division, resulting in relegation to Division One North. The 2021–22 season saw them finish second-from-bottom of a renamed Division One West and relegated to the Premier Division of the North West Counties League. At the end of the 2023–24 season they were transferred to Division One of the Northern League.

== Ground ==
After being established, the club were given land at Parkside near the K Shoe factory. Club members paid one pence a week into a sports association, which used the fund to develop the ground. Dressing rooms were built in 1928 and a main stand erected in 1930. Terracing was installed behind one goal and along one side of the pitch after World War II, with the stand was expanded in 1955. More seating was installed the following year when a clubhouse was built with seats in front of it, and floodlights erected in 1965.

== Club officials ==
Position	Member
Chairman	Michael O'Neill
Secretary	Craig Campbell
Commercial manager	Michael O'Neill
Club President	Alvin Finch
Source: Kendal Town F.C.

== Honours ==
- Lancashire Combination
  - Champions 1948–49, 1964–65
  - League Cup winners 1955–56, 1960–61
- Westmorland County Cup
  - Winners 1924–25

== Records ==
- Best FA Cup performance: Second round, 1949–50, 1963–64
- Best FA Trophy performance: Second round, 1980–81, 1998–99, 2001–02, 2004–05
- Best FA Vase performance: Third round, 1989–90
- Record attendance: 5,184 vs Grimsby Town, FA Cup, 1955–56

== See also ==
- Kendal Town F.C. players
- Kendal Town F.C. managers
