= Vulcan Newton F.C. =

Vulcan Newton
- Full name: Vulcan Newton Football Club
- Ground: Sports Field, Wargrave Road, Newton-le-Willows

Vulcan Newton Football Club was an English football club based in Newton-le-Willows, in the Metropolitan Borough of St Helens, Merseyside.

== History ==
Vulcan Newton was a works team associated with the Vulcan Foundry, an English locomotive builder, in what was then Lancashire.

The early history of the club is now unclear but the team did play in the Warrington & District League winning the league title in 1923–24. The modern club was officially formed in 1955, funded by the company and its workers. A further title followed in 1970–71 with further success in the 1970s. For the 1979–80 season the club moved up to the Lancashire Combination and finished in the top ten in each of the three seasons in that league.

For the 1982–83 season they became founding members of the North West Counties Football League as a Division Three club. They finished in the top half of the league for two seasons before dropping back down to the Warrington & District League. The club merged with another local club to become Vulcan Clock Face FC.

== Stadium ==
The club played their home games at Sports Field, Wargrave Road in Newton-le-Willows. The area of the former ground has now been redeveloped.
