= 1982–83 Alliance Premier League =

Alliance Premier League
- Season: 1982–83
- Champions: Enfield (1st Alliance Premier League title)
- Promoted to the Football League: None
- Runners-up: Maidstone United
- Relegated to Level 6: Barrow, Stafford Rangers
- Promoted for the next season: Gateshead, Kidderminster Harriers
- Matches: 462
- Goals: 1,440 (3.12 per match)
- Biggest home win: Maidstone United – Scarborough 6–0; Maidstone United – Trowbridge Town 6–0; Runcorn – Kettering Town 6–0; 6–0; Wealdstone – Barnet
- Biggest away win: Barrow – Telford United 0–5
- Highest scoring: Boston United – Yeovil Town 6–3; Northwich Victoria – Trowbridge Town 6–3
- Longest winning run: ?
- Longest unbeaten run: ?
- Longest losing run: ?
- Highest attendance: ?
- Lowest attendance: ?
- Average attendance: ?

The Alliance Premier League season of 1982–83 was the fourth season of the Alliance Premier League.

== New teams in the league this season ==
- Bangor City (promoted 1981–82)
- Nuneaton Borough (promoted 1981–82)
- Wealdstone (promoted 1981–82)

== Final table ==
Pos	Team	Pld	W	D	L	GF	GA	GD	Pts	Qualification or relegation
1	Enfield (C)	42	25	9	8	95	48	+47	84	
2	Maidstone United	42	25	8	9	83	34	+49	83	
3	Wealdstone	42	22	13	7	80	41	+39	79	
4	Runcorn	42	22	8	12	73	53	+20	74	
5	Boston United	42	20	12	10	77	57	+20	72	
6	Telford United	42	20	11	11	69	48	+21	71	
7	Weymouth	42	20	10	12	63	48	+15	70	
8	Northwich Victoria	42	18	10	14	68	63	+5	64	
9	Scarborough	42	17	12	13	71	58	+13	63	
10	Bath City	42	17	9	16	58	55	+3	60	
11	Nuneaton Borough	42	15	13	14	57	60	−3	58	
12	Altrincham	42	15	10	17	62	56	+6	55	
13	Bangor City	42	14	13	15	71	77	−6	55	
14	Dagenham	42	12	15	15	60	65	−5	51	
15	Barnet	42	16	3	23	55	78	−23	51	
16	Frickley Athletic	42	12	13	17	66	77	−11	49	
17	Worcester City	42	12	10	20	58	87	−29	46	
18	Trowbridge Town	42	12	7	23	56	88	−32	43	
19	Kettering Town	42	11	7	24	69	99	−30	40	
20	Yeovil Town	42	11	7	24	63	99	−36	40	
21	Barrow (R)	42	8	12	22	46	74	−28	36	Relegation to the Northern Premier League
22	Stafford Rangers (R)	42	5	14	23	40	75	−35	29	Relegation to the Northern Premier League

(C) Champions; (R) Relegated

== Results ==
Home \ Away	ALT	BAN	BAR	BRW	BAT	BOS	DAG	ENF	FRK	KET	MDS	NOR	NUN	RUN	SCA	STA	TEL	TRO	WEA	WEY	WRC	YEO
Altrincham		2–0	3–0	2–2	0–0	2–2	2–0	2–2	2–2	3–1	0–2	3–0	1–2	2–1	2–1	4–0	1–0	2–0	0–1	1–0	2–0	4–1
Bangor City	1–0		1–0	2–2	0–0	0–1	1–1	0–0	1–0	4–2	2–2	1–1	5–2	1–2	0–3	1–0	1–1	4–3	2–2	4–3	0–2	2–2
Barnet	2–1	1–3		2–1	2–1	1–4	2–2	1–3	4–1	2–3	1–3	4–2	1–0	2–0	2–3	1–0	0–2	1–3	0–0	1–2	3–1	4–4
Barrow	2–2	1–5	0–1		0–1	1–1	1–2	0–3	2–0	2–0	0–3	0–0	2–2	1–2	1–2	2–1	0–5	3–2	0–2	3–0	2–0	3–1
Bath City	0–2	1–2	0–2	4–1		3–2	3–1	2–2	4–3	2–1	0–1	3–0	3–0	2–1	2–3	5–1	0–0	2–0	3–2	0–1	0–0	2–0
Boston United	3–0	4–3	1–0	2–1	2–2		3–3	0–2	2–1	2–1	1–0	1–0	1–1	2–4	1–0	1–1	4–0	3–0	0–0	3–2	4–1	6–3
Dagenham	1–1	1–1	1–2	0–0	0–1	1–1		1–0	4–1	2–3	0–1	3–1	0–0	3–1	1–1	3–3	1–1	0–1	1–2	1–2	3–3	3–0
Enfield	2–1	6–2	5–0	2–0	3–0	4–2	2–1		2–2	5–2	1–0	2–1	1–1	0–0	5–3	0–1	6–2	2–0	0–1	2–1	4–0	3–1
Frickley Athletic	3–0	3–3	0–1	1–1	2–1	2–0	1–2	5–2		3–2	2–1	0–0	2–1	0–2	2–1	3–0	2–2	2–2	2–2	1–2	2–0	3–0
Kettering Town	3–2	3–4	3–1	3–1	4–2	2–0	1–2	0–2	4–1		1–3	1–4	0–0	3–1	2–2	2–2	1–2	1–1	1–3	1–1	4–1	5–2
Maidstone United	3–2	6–1	2–0	2–0	0–1	2–0	1–3	1–1	4–0	5–1		1–0	2–0	2–0	6–0	1–0	1–0	6–0	0–3	3–0	5–0	2–1
Northwich Victoria	2–1	1–4	1–0	1–0	3–0	1–1	3–0	3–1	2–1	2–1	2–1		2–2	2–0	1–1	2–1	2–1	6–3	3–3	1–1	3–0	5–0
Nuneaton Borough	3–1	2–1	1–0	1–1	5–0	1–2	1–1	0–2	5–1	0–0	2–2	2–1		0–2	0–2	1–1	2–1	2–0	1–1	2–0	2–0	3–1
Runcorn	1–0	1–2	2–0	2–1	1–0	3–2	5–1	2–2	3–3	6–0	1–1	1–1	3–1		2–1	4–1	0–0	3–2	2–1	1–0	3–1	4–1
Scarborough	1–1	2–0	0–2	1–1	0–1	0–0	1–1	0–2	1–2	3–0	2–1	5–1	3–0	3–2		2–1	1–1	5–2	1–2	2–0	4–1	2–2
Stafford Rangers	2–3	1–1	1–0	2–0	1–1	0–2	1–2	0–3	1–1	1–1	2–3	1–1	1–2	0–1	0–0		1–1	3–2	2–1	1–2	0–0	1–3
Telford United	1–1	2–0	3–0	1–3	2–0	3–2	3–0	4–3	1–1	2–1	3–1	3–0	2–0	4–0	0–2	2–0		3–1	0–0	2–0	2–0	3–2
Trowbridge Town	3–2	3–2	0–2	2–1	1–1	1–2	2–2	2–1	2–0	2–1	0–2	0–2	0–2	1–2	1–1	5–3	2–0		0–0	0–0	2–3	2–1
Wealdstone	1–1	2–0	6–0	4–0	1–1	0–0	3–1	1–3	2–0	4–0	0–0	2–1	1–2	1–0	2–2	3–2	2–0	4–0		2–4	2–0	2–0
Weymouth	2–0	2–1	1–3	1–1	1–0	4–2	0–1	1–0	0–0	1–1	0–0	3–0	3–0	1–1	2–0	0–0	0–0	2–1	4–1		4–2	2–0
Worcester City	1–0	1–1	4–2	2–1	1–4	1–1	1–4	1–1	4–4	2–0	1–1	3–0	1–1	1–0	1–3	3–0	1–0	4–1	1–3	3–3		2–1
Yeovil Town	2–1	3–2	4–2	2–2	1–0	0–4	2–0	1–3	2–1	2–1	0–0	2–4	6–2	1–1	2–1	0–0	3–4	0–1	1–5	0–2	3–0	

Updated to match(es) played on unknown. Source: Tony Williams (ed.), Rothmans Football Yearbook 1983–84. Queen Anne Press, Macdonald & Co., London & Sydney, 1983, p. 920.
Legend: Blue = home team win; Yellow = draw; Red = away team win.
- The match on New Year's Day between Maidstone United and Weymouth was postponed after several Weymouth players went on strike over revised travel arrangements. Weymouth were fined £100, ordered to pay £895 to Maidstone for match expenses and a further £182 for the arbitration hearing that followed the strike. They were also docked 10 points, but the deduction was reversed on appeal before the end of the season and therefore did not affect Weymouth's final total of 70 points.
Locations of the Alliance Premier League teams 1982–1983
Locations of the Alliance Premier League 1982–1983 London teams

== Promotion and relegation ==
=== Promoted ===
- Gateshead (from the Northern Premier League)
- Kidderminster Harriers (from the Southern Premier League)

=== Relegated ===
- Barrow (to the Northern Premier League)
- Stafford Rangers (to the Northern Premier League)

== Election to the Football League ==
This year Enfield, the winners of the Alliance Premier League, could not apply for election because they did not meet Football League requirements, so 2nd placed Maidstone United won the right to apply for election to the Football League to replace one of the four bottom sides in the 1982–83 Football League Fourth Division. The vote went as follows:

Club	Final Position	Votes
Blackpool	21st (Fourth Division)	52
Crewe Alexandra	23rd (Fourth Division)	49
Hereford United	24th (Fourth Division)	49
Hartlepool United	22nd (Fourth Division)	36
Maidstone United	2nd (Alliance Premier League)	26

As a result of this, Maidstone United did not gain membership of the Football League.
