= Prescot BI F.C. =

Prescot BI
- Full name: Prescot BI Football Club
- Founded: before 1932
- Dissolved: after 1999

Prescot BI Football Club was an English association football club based in Prescot, Merseyside. They competed in the Cheshire County League and the North West Counties League, the FA Cup and the FA Vase.

The club appears to have been founded at some point prior to 1932 as 'BI Social'. In its inaugural season, 1932–33, the club competed in Liverpool's Business Houses League winning the League and Challenge Cup titles without dropping a point in the former. The following season they transferred to the Liverpool League. After two titles and a runner's up spot, for the 1936–37 season they transferred to Liverpool's senior league, the Liverpool County County Combination in which they competed until 1978, when they were among the clubs invited to form the new Cheshire County League Division Two.

Among the new division's eighteen founder members, Prescot BI finished the 1978-79 season 8th; in the following three seasons, they were placed 4th, 6th and 13th, before leaving to become founder members of the North West Counties League in 1982.

Joining Division Two for the 1982-83 season, Prescot BI ended that season 18th of 20 teams, one place and three points above relegated Padiham, and although they improved to 13th the following year, they resigned from the league at the season's conclusion. The club thereafter competed only locally, in the St Helens Combination, where they remained until at least the 1998–99 season.

They entered the FA Cup twice, in 1948-49 and 1949–50, losing in the extra-preliminary round on both occasions, to St Helens Town and Haydock C&B Recreation respectively. In the FA Vase, they reached the first round proper three times, in the 1976–77, 1980–81 and 1981–82 seasons.
