= Wigan Rovers F.C. =

Association football club in England

- Full name: Wigan Rovers Football Club
- Nickname: Rovers
- Founded: 1959
- Ground: St. James Park, Poolstock
- League: Mid Lancashire Football League
Home colours

Wigan Rovers Football Club is an English football team based in Wigan, Greater Manchester. They play in the Mid Lancashire Football League, though they have played in the FA Cup during the 1960s and the FA Vase during the 1970s, eventually becoming founding members of the North West Counties Football League in 1982. However, they were only members for one season.

== History ==
Wigan Rovers joined the Cheshire County League in 1959. After finishing bottom of the league in their first two seasons, the club failed to gain re-election, and joined the second division of the Lancashire Combination in 1961. In 1966, the team won the league and were promoted to the first division. The club entered the FA Cup on four occasions between 1967 and 1973, and the FA Vase on four occasions between 1974 and 1978. Their best result in the FA Cup was to win a replay against Horwich RMI in 1968–69, and their best result in the FA Vase was to get to the Second Round in 1975–76 where they were knocked out by Prescot Town.

Wigan Rovers were founding members of the North West Counties League in the 1982–83 but left after just one season in Division Three. The club then joined the West Lancashire League, winning promotion to Division One in 1987, but were relegated after two seasons. The team slowly declined over the next few years before dropping out of the league in 1994 after failing to gain re-election.

Since then, a team named Wigan Rovers became part of the local Wigan & District Amateur League, winning the title in 1999–2000.

In 2024, the club joined the Mid Lancashire Football League.

== Colours and badge ==
The club's home colours are red and black striped shirt, black shorts and socks. Away colours are green and white striped shirt, green shorts and white socks both kits with the badge of a picture of a lion rampant above a football.

== Honours ==
- Lancashire Combination Division Two
  - Champions 1965–66
- Wigan & District Amateur League
  - Champions 1999–2000

== Records ==
- FA Cup
  - First Qualifying Round Replay 1968–69
- FA Vase
  - Second Round 1975–76
