= Northern Premier League =

English association football league

- Founded: 1968; 58 years ago
- Country: England
- Number of clubs: 88: Premier Division: 22; Division One East: 22; Division One Midlands: 22; Division One West: 22
- Level on pyramid: Levels 7–8
- Promotion to: National League North
- Relegation to: Eastern Counties League; Midland League; Northern League; Northern Counties East League; North West Counties League; United Counties League North or South
- Domestic cup(s): FA Cup; FA Trophy
- Current champions: Hebburn Town (Premier Division); Redcar Athletic (Division One East); Anstey Nomads (Division One Midlands); Bury (Division One West) (2025–26)
- Website: thenpl.co.uk
- Current: 2026–27 season

The Northern Premier League is an English football league that was founded in 1968. Together with the Isthmian League and the Southern League it forms levels seven and eight of the English football league system.

Geographically, the league covers all of Northern England and the northern, central areas of the Midlands, and western parts of East Anglia. Originally a single-division competition, a second division was added in 1987: Division One, and in 2007, a third was added when Division One split into two geographic sections - Division One North and Division One South. In 2018, Division One was re-aligned as East and West Divisions, then North West and South East in 2019. In 2021, the FA restructured the non-League football pyramid and created Division One East, West, and Midlands.

Successful teams at the top of the NPL Premier Division are promoted to level six of the pyramid (either National League North or National League South), and at the bottom end of the competition, teams are relegated down to level nine, where several regional feeder leagues promote clubs into the league.

== History ==
The Northern Premier League (NPL) was founded in 1968, as the northern equivalent of the Southern League, decades after the other two leagues at what is now the seventh tier of the English football league system, the Isthmian League and the Southern League. At that time they were the highest level non-League division below the English Football League, the same level as the other league in Northern England, the Cheshire League.

Over the next two decades, the NPL displaced its older rival to become the pre-eminent regional competition in Northern England, with the Cheshire League eventually forced to accept status as feeder league to the NPL. In 1979, upon the creation of the Alliance Premier League (which later became the Conference and is now the National League), the NPL became a feeder league and fell down one level in the English football league system, and with the then-Conference's addition of regional divisions in 2004 the NPL was demoted by a further tier and there are now two levels between it and the English Football League.

From 1992–93 to 1994–95 the league's Division One included two non-English clubs, Caernarfon Town from Wales and Gretna from Scotland, who later joined their countries' league systems. Colwyn Bay, Bangor City, Newtown, and Rhyl have also played in the league.

In 2018, the NPL's member clubs voted 37–27, with one abstention and three clubs' absence, to split Step 4 (level 8) divisions from east to west starting from the 2018–19 season, and one year later, the league published its successful bid to add another division at Step 4 initially in 2020, further altering Division One into northwest and southeast for travel reasons. After the Football Association (FA) deferred its implementation of changes to the NLS, the NPL's additional division was created in 2021 instead.

- 1968–69 to 1986–87: Premier Division
- 1987–88 to 2006–07: Premier Division, Division One
- 2007–08 to 2017–18: Premier Division, Division One North, Division One South
- 2018–19: Premier Division, Division One East, Division One West
- 2019–20 to 2020–21: Premier Division, Division One North West, Division One South East
- 2021–22 onwards: Premier Division, Division One West, Division One East, Division One Midlands

=== Sponsorship ===
Owing to title sponsorship deals, the league has been billed under various names, including a sixteen-year spell as the Unibond League, the longest such deal in world football. When this deal ended in 2010, a new deal was announced which saw the competition billed as the Evo-Stik League until the 2017–18 season. The League announced on 8 July 2019 that a two-year deal for seasons 2019-20 and 2020-21 had been agreed with new sponsor BetVictor. This sponsorship agreement with BetVictor was subsequently terminated early in April 2020 with a replacement, Entain's Pitching In, announced as the next sponsor for 2020–21. At the time of announcement, Entain went by its former name GVC Holdings. Under this partnership, the NPL is marketed as one of the three Trident Leagues, alongside its Isthmian and Southern counterparts.

== Structure ==
Since 2021, the NPL has had four divisions: the Premier Division, Division One Midlands, Division One West and Division One East. Prior to 2007 there was just a single Division One, and from 2018 to 2021 Division One was arranged on a north-south, then east-west basis.

The Premier Division has 22 clubs, with the champions promoted to the National League along with the winners of a playoff between the second to fifth place clubs. Theoretically, clubs from the NPL could be promoted into either of the National League's two regional divisions, but the geographical footprint of the NPL has never overlapped with that of the National League South, so (as of 2015) all promoted NPL clubs have been placed in the National League North. The bottom three teams are usually relegated to Division One North West or South East, but NPL Premier Division clubs in the most southerly locales could be relegated to the Southern League Division One Central.

From the 2019–20 season, Division One North West and South East have 20 clubs each. In each division, the champions are promoted to the Premier Division, along with the winners of a divisional playoff. The bottom two clubs in each division are relegated to one of the feeder leagues below provided there are enough suitable promotion candidates from those leagues. The champions of the three feeder leagues covering the NPL area are promoted each season. These are the Northern League, the Northern Counties East League, and the North West Counties League. Clubs in the northern extremities of the Midland League and the United Counties League may also be promoted to the Northern Premier League.

Should there be an unusually large or small number of clubs relegated to and/or promoted to the level of the NPL from Northern England, the National League System (NLS) Committee can order one or more of the NPL's southernmost clubs to transfer to the Southern League (or vice versa) to maintain numerical balance between the leagues.

Division One North West and South East teams receive a bye to the preliminary round of FA Cup Qualification. Premier Division teams receive a bye to the first round of Qualification.

The league formerly ran one cup competition, with all member clubs competing in the League Challenge Cup. In the past, the league has run other competitions, such as the Chairman's Cup, the President's Cup and the Peter Swales Shield.

== 2025–26 members ==
=== Premier Division ===
Locations of the Northern Premier League clubs by division – Premier Division
Id	Club	Home ground	Ground capacity
1	Ashton United	Hurst Cross	4,250 (250 seated)
2	Bamber Bridge	Sir Tom Finney Stadium	3,000 (554 seated)
3	Cleethorpes Town	Clee Road	1,000
4	FC United of Manchester	Broadhurst Park	4,900
5	Gainsborough Trinity	The Northolme	4,340 (504 seated)
6	Guiseley	Nethermoor Park	4,200
7	Hebburn Town	The Green Energy Sports Ground	1,500
8	Hednesford Town	Keys Park	6,039
9	Hyde United	Ewen Fields	4,250 (530 seated)
10	Ilkeston Town	New Manor Ground	3,029
11	Lancaster City	Giant Axe	3,513 (513 seated)
12	Leek Town	Harrison Park	3,600
13	Morpeth Town	Craik Park	1,950 (300 seated)
14	Prescot Cables	Valerie Park	3,200
15	Rushall Olympic	Dales Lane	1,400
16	Stocksbridge Park Steels	Bracken Moor	3,500
17	Stockton Town	Bishopton Road West	1,800
18	Warrington Rylands 1906	Gorsey Lane	1,345
19	Warrington Town	Cantilever Park	2,500
20	Whitby Town	Turnbull Ground	3,500 (505 seated)
21	Workington	Borough Park	3,100 (500 seated)

=== Division One West ===
Locations of Northern Premier League 2025–26 Division One West teams
Team	Location	Stadium	Capacity
Atherton Collieries	Atherton	Alder Street	2,500
Avro	Oldham	Whitebank Stadium	1,500
Bootle	Bootle	New Bucks Park	2,500
Bury	Bury	Gigg Lane	12,500
Chasetown	Burntwood	The Scholars Ground	3,000
Clitheroe	Clitheroe	EcoGiants Stadium	2,000
Congleton Town	Congleton	Cleric Stadium	1,500
Darlaston Town 1874	Walsall	The Paycare Ground	1,000
Kidsgrove Athletic	Kidsgrove	The Autonet Insurance Stadium	2,000
Lower Breck	Liverpool (Anfield)	Anfield Sports and Community Centre	1,000
Mossley	Mossley	Seel Park	4,000
Nantwich Town	Nantwich	The Weaver Stadium	3,500
Newcastle Town	Newcastle-under-Lyme	Lyme Valley Stadium	4,000
Runcorn Linnets	Runcorn	APEC Taxis Stadium	1,600
Shifnal Town	Shifnal	Acoustafoam Stadium	1,500
Sporting Khalsa	Willenhall	Aspray Arena	5,000
Stafford Rangers	Stafford	Marston Road	4,150
Stalybridge Celtic	Stalybridge	Bower Fold	6,500
Trafford	Flixton	Shawe View	2,500
Vauxhall Motors	Ellesmere Port	Rivacre Park	3,300
Witton Albion	Northwich	Wincham Park	4,813
Wythenshawe Town	Wythenshawe	Ericstan Stadium	1,320

=== Division One East ===
Locations of the Northern Premier League clubs by division – Division One East
Club	Home ground	Ground capacity
Ashington	Woodhorn Lane	2,000 (250 seated)
Bishop Auckland	Heritage Park	1,950 (500 seated)
Blyth Spartans	Croft Park	4,435
Blyth Town	South Newsham Playing Fields	1,000
Bradford (Park Avenue)	Horsfall Stadium	3,500 (1,800 seated)
Bridlington Town	Queensgate	3,000 (542 seated)
Brighouse Town	St Giles Road	1,350 (150 seated)
Consett	Belle View Stadium	3,770 (250 seated)
Dunston UTS	Wellington Road	2,500 (150 seated)
Emley	Welfare Ground (Emley)	2,000 (305 seated)
Garforth Town	Wheatley Park	3,000 (278 seated)
Grimsby Borough	Bradley Football Centre	1,300 (180 seated)
Hallam	Sandygate	1,665
Heaton Stannington	Grounsell Park	2,000
Lincoln United	Ashby Avenue	2,714
Matlock Town	Causeway Lane	2,214
Newton Aycliffe	Moore Lane Park	1,300 (100 seated)
North Ferriby	The Dransfield Stadium	3,000 (504 seated)
Ossett United	Ingfield	1,950 (360 seated)
Pontefract Collieries	Beechnut Lane	1,500 (300 seated)
Redcar Athletic	Green Lane	1,000
Silsden	Keighley Road Stadium	1,500

=== Division One Midlands ===
Locations of the Northern Premier League clubs by division – Division One Midlands
Club	Home ground	Ground capacity
AFC Rushden & Diamonds	Hayden Road	2,000 (257 seated)
Anstey Nomads	Cropston Road	1,500 (150 seated)
Basford United	Greenwich Avenue	1,950 (300 seated)
Bedworth United	The Oval	3,000 (300 seated)
Belper Town	Christchurch Meadow	2,650
Boldmere St Michaels	Trevor Brown Memorial Ground	2,000 (230 seated)
Bourne Town	Abbey Lawn	2,000
Carlton Town	Bill Stokeld Stadium	1,968
Coleshill Town	Pack Meadow	2,000
Corby Town	Steel Park	3,893 (577 seated)
Coventry Sphinx	Sphinx Drive	1,000
Lichfield City	City Ground	1,500
Long Eaton United	Grange Park	1,500 (450 seated)
Loughborough Students	Loughborough University Stadium	3,300
Mickleover	Station Road	1,500
Racing Club Warwick	Townsend Meadow	2,000 (200 seated)
Rugby Borough	Kilsby Lane	1,000
Rugby Town	Butlin Road	6,000 (740 seated)
Shepshed Dynamo	The Dovecote Stadium	2,500 (500 seated)
St Neots Town	New Rowley Park	3,500
Sutton Coldfield Town	Central Ground	2,000
Wellingborough Town	London Road	5,000 (350 seated)

== Champions ==
1968–87
Season	Northern Premier League
1968–69	Macclesfield Town
1969–70	Macclesfield Town
1970–71	Wigan Athletic
1971–72	Stafford Rangers
1972–73	Boston United
1973–74	Boston United
1974–75	Wigan Athletic
1975–76	Runcorn
1976–77	Boston United
1977–78	Boston United
1978–79	Mossley
1979–80	Mossley
1980–81	Runcorn
1981–82	Bangor City
1982–83	Gateshead
1983–84	Barrow
1984–85	Stafford Rangers
1985–86	Gateshead
1986–87	Macclesfield Town

1987–2007
Season	Premier Division	Division One
1987–88	Chorley	Fleetwood Town
1988–89	Barrow	Colne Dynamoes
1989–90	Colne Dynamoes	Leek Town
1990–91	Witton Albion	Whitley Bay
1991–92	Stalybridge Celtic	Colwyn Bay
1992–93	Southport	Bridlington Town
1993–94	Marine	Guiseley
1994–95	Marine	Blyth Spartans
1995–96	Bamber Bridge	Lancaster City
1996–97	Leek Town	Radcliffe Borough
1997–98	Barrow	Whitby Town
1998–99	Altrincham	Droylsden
1999–2000	Leigh RMI	Accrington Stanley
2000–01	Stalybridge Celtic	Bradford Park Avenue
2001–02	Burton Albion	Harrogate Town
2002–03	Accrington Stanley	Alfreton Town
2003–04	Hucknall Town	Hyde United
2004–05	Hyde United	North Ferriby United
2005–06	Blyth Spartans	Mossley
2006–07	Burscough	Buxton

2007–18
Season	Premier Division	Division One	
Season	Premier Division	North	South
2007–08	Fleetwood Town	Bradford Park Avenue	Retford United
2008–09	Eastwood Town	Durham City	Retford United
2009–10	Guiseley	FC Halifax Town	Mickleover Sports
2010–11	FC Halifax Town	Chester	Barwell
2011–12	Chester	AFC Fylde	Grantham Town
2012–13	North Ferriby United	Skelmersdale United	King's Lynn Town
2013–14	Chorley	Curzon Ashton	Halesowen Town
2014–15	FC United of Manchester	Salford City	Mickleover Sports
2015–16	Darlington 1883	Warrington Town	Stafford Rangers
2016–17	Blyth Spartans	Lancaster City	Shaw Lane
2017–18	Altrincham	South Shields	Basford United

2018–Present
Season	Premier Division	Division One		
Season	Premier Division	West	East	Midlands (2021–present)
2018–19	Farsley Celtic	Morpeth Town	Atherton Collieries	—N/a
2019–20^{1}	South Shields	Leek Town	Workington	—N/a
2020–21^{2}	Mickleover	Colne	Leek Town	—N/a
2021–22	Buxton	Warrington Rylands 1906	Liversedge	Ilkeston Town
2022–23	South Shields	Macclesfield	Worksop Town	Stamford
2023–24	Radcliffe	Leek Town	Hebburn Town	Spalding United
2024–25	Macclesfield	Widnes	Cleethorpes Town	Quorn
2025–26	Hebburn Town	Bury	Redcar Athletic	Anstey Nomads

^{1} The 2019–20 season was terminated on 26 March 2020 due to the coronavirus pandemic; the teams listed here were in first place in the standings at the time of the termination, but were not recognised as champions.

^{2} The 2020–21 season was also terminated on 24 February 2021 due to the coronavirus pandemic; the teams listed here were in first place in the standings at the time of the termination, but were not recognised as champions.

=== Promoted ===
Since the league's formation in 1968, the following clubs have won promotion to higher levels of the English football league system -

Seasons	Promoted to
1958–1979	Football League Fourth Division
1979–1986	Alliance Premier League
1986–2003	Football Conference
2003–2005	Football Conference National
2004–2015	Football Conference North
2015–Present	National League North

Season	Promoted	To
1977–78	Wigan Athletic (2nd)	Football League Fourth Division
1978–79	Altrincham (2nd); Scarborough (4th); Boston United (6th); Stafford Rangers (8th); Northwich Victoria (10th); Bangor City (12th); Barrow (16th)	All 7 clubs split to form the new Alliance Premier League above the division
1979–80	Frickley Athletic (3rd)	Alliance Premier League
1980–81	Runcorn	Alliance Premier League
1981–82	Bangor City	Alliance Premier League
1982–83	Gateshead	Alliance Premier League
1983–84	Barrow	Alliance Premier League
1984–85	Stafford Rangers	Alliance Premier League
1985–86	Gateshead	Football Conference
1986–87	Macclesfield Town	Football Conference
1987–88	Chorley	Football Conference
1988–89	Barrow	Football Conference
1989–90	Gateshead (2nd)	Football Conference
1990–91	Witton Albion	Football Conference
1991–92	Stalybridge Celtic	Football Conference
1992–93	Southport	Football Conference
1994–95	Morecambe (2nd)	Football Conference
1996–97	Leek Town	Football Conference
1997–98	Barrow	Football Conference
1998–99	Altrincham	Football Conference
1999–00	Leigh RMI	Football Conference
2000–01	Stalybridge Celtic	Football Conference
2001–02	Burton Albion	Football Conference
2002–03	Accrington Stanley	Football Conference

Play-offs introduced (2003–present)
Season	Promoted	Play-off winner	To
2003–04	Hucknall Town (1st); Droylsden (2nd); Barrow (3rd); Alfreton Town (4th); Harrogate Town (5th); Southport (6th); Worksop Town (7th); Lancaster City (8th); Vauxhall Motors (9th); Gainsborough Trinity (10th); Stalybridge Celtic (11th); Altrincham (12th); Runcorn (13th); Ashton United (14th)	Bradford Park Avenue (17th)	Football Conference North created above the division
2004–05	Hyde United	Workington (2nd)	Football Conference North
2005–06	Blyth Spartans	Farsley Celtic (4th)	Football Conference North
2006–07	Burscough	AFC Telford United (4th)	Football Conference North
2007–08	Fleetwood Town	Gateshead (3rd)	Football Conference North
2008–09	Eastwood Town	Ilkeston Town (2nd)	Football Conference North
2009–10	Guiseley	Boston United (3rd)	Football Conference North
2010–11	FC Halifax Town	Colwyn Bay (2nd)	Football Conference North
2011–12	Chester	Bradford Park Avenue (4th)	Football Conference North
2012–13	North Ferriby United	Hednesford Town (2nd)	Football Conference North
2013–14	Chorley	AFC Fylde (3rd)	Football Conference North
2014–15	FC United of Manchester	Curzon Ashton (4th)	National League North
2015–16	Darlington 1883	Salford City (3rd)	National League North
2016–17	Blyth Spartans	Spennymoor Town (2nd)	National League North
2017–18	Altrincham	Ashton United (2nd)	National League North
2018–19	Farsley Celtic	—N/a	National League North
2019–20	No promotion to National League North		
2020–21	Step 3 promotion cancelled		
2021–22	Buxton	Scarborough Athletic (3rd)	National League North
2022–23	South Shields	Warrington Town (2nd)	National League North
2023–24	Radcliffe	Marine (3rd)	National League North
2024–25	Macclesfield	Worksop Town (2nd)	National League North

== Cup competitions ==
=== Defunct competitions ===
==== League Challenge Cup ====
The league previously ran one cup competition, the League Challenge Cup, which was contested by every club in the league.

===== Finals =====
Season	Winner	Result	Runner-up	Venue	Attendance
1968–69	Bangor City	5–2 (agg.)	Runcorn	1L: 2L:	1L: 2L:
1969–70	Altrincham	4–3 (agg.)	Macclesfield Town	1L: 2L: Moss Rose	1L: 4,400; 2L: 6,833
1970–71	Fleetwood	1–1 (agg.); 1–0 (rep.)	Macclesfield Town	1L: 2L: Moss Rose rep. Springfield Park	1L: 1,374; 2L: 2,457 rep.
1971–72	Wigan Athletic	4–2 (agg.)	Gainsborough Trinity	1L: 2L:	1L: 2L:
1972–73	Northwich Victoria	3–2 (agg.)	Wigan Athletic	1L: 2L:	1L: 2L:
1973–74	Boston United	4–3 (agg.)	Altrincham	1L: 2L:	1L: 2L:
1974–75	Runcorn	2–1 (agg.)	Stafford Rangers	1L: 2L:	1L: 2L:
1975–76	Boston United	4–3 (agg.)	Mossley	1L: York Street; 2L: Seel Park	1L: 2,212; 2L: 711
1976–77	Scarborough	1–0	Runcorn	Maine Road	
1977–78	Matlock Town	3–0	Boston United	Maine Road	
1978–79	Mossley	4–1	Northwich Victoria	Maine Road	5,054
1979–80	Runcorn	2–0	Lancaster City	Maine Road	
1980–81	Runcorn	4–3	Marine	Maine Road	
1981–82	Gainsborough Trinity	1–0	Mossley	Maine Road	1,658
1982–83	Burton Albion	2–1	Macclesfield Town	Maine Road	2,538
1983–84	South Liverpool	1–1 (wp)	Hyde United	Maine Road	
1984–85	Marine	3–2	Goole Town	Maine Road	
1985–86	Hyde United	1–0	Marine	Maine Road	
1986–87	Macclesfield Town	2–0	Burton Albion	Maine Road	2,037
1987–88	Goole Town	2–2 (wp)	Barrow	Maine Road	1,579
1988–89	Mossley	2–1	Fleetwood	Maine Road	2,110
1989–90	Hyde United	1–0	Gateshead	Maine Road	
1990–91	Southport	4–1	Buxton	Maine Road	1,700
1991–92	Marine	1–0	Frickley Athletic	Maine Road	
1992–93	Winsford United	1–1 (wp)	Warrington Town	Maine Road	
1993–94	Spennymoor United	3–1	Hyde United	Wetherby Road	585
1994–95	Bamber Bridge	2–1	Bishop Auckland	Burnden Park	
1995–96	Hyde United	1–1 (wp)	Leek Town	Burnden Park	501
1996–97	Gainsborough Trinity	1–0	Boston United	Sincil Bank	
1997–98	Altrincham	2–1	Gainsborough Trinity	Saltergate	
1998–99	Stalybridge Celtic	2–1	Guiseley		
1999–00	Lancaster City	1–0	Worksop Town	Bower Fold	669
2000–01	Lancaster City	2–2 (wp)	Bishop Auckland	Giant Axe	530
2001–02	Accrington Stanley	1–1(wp) (0-1; 1-0; pens 5-4)	Bradford Park Avenue	1L: Horsfall Stadium; 2L: Crown Ground	1L: 471; 2L: 1,107
2002–03	Marine	3–0 (agg.)	Gateshead	1L: Filtrona Park; 2L: Rossett Park	1L: 184; 2L: 425
2003–04	Droylsden	4–1 (agg.)	Hucknall Town	1L: Butcher's Arms Ground; 2L: Watnall Road	1L: 424; 2L: 597
2004–05	Matlock Town	5–3 (agg.)	Whitby Town	1L: Causeway Lane; 2L: Turnbull Ground	1L: 547; 2L: 490
2005–06	Farsley Celtic	1–0	Stocksbridge Park Steels	Throstle Nest	507
2006–07	Fleetwood	1–0	Matlock Town	Wincham Park	426
2007–08	Eastwood Town	3–0	Skelmersdale United	Tameside Stadium	372
2008–09	Guiseley	3–2	Ilkeston Town	Tameside Stadium	227
2009–10	Boston United	2–0	Retford United	Ashby Avenue	503
2010–11	Ashton United	1–0	Northwich Victoria	Wincham Park	489
2011–12	North Ferriby United	4–1	Rushall Olympic	Coronation Park	256
2012–13	North Ferriby United	1–1 (wp)	Curzon Ashton	Throstle Nest	179
2013–14	AFC Fylde	1–0	Skelmersdale United	Edgeley Park	358
2014–15	Warrington Town	0–0 (wp)	Farsley	Edgeley Park	731
2015–16	Marine	2–1	Scarborough Athletic	Throstle Nest	690
2016–17	Bamber Bridge	2–1	Grantham Town	Harrison Park	474
2017–18	Atherton Collieries	2–1	Coalville Town	North Street	374
2018–19	Trafford	2–1	Farsley Celtic	Broadhurst Park	374
2019–20	Competition abandoned due to COVID-19				
Discontinued since 2020

In the past the league has run three other cup competitions - the President's Cup, Chairman's Cup and Peter Swales Shield.

===== Winners =====
Season	President's Cup	Chairman's Cup	Peter Swales Shield
1970–71	-	-	Wigan Athletic
1971–72	-	-	Wigan Athletic
1972–73	-	-	Boston United
1973–74	-	-	Boston United
1974–75	-	-	Wigan Athletic
1975–76	-	-	Boston United
1976–77	-	-	Boston United
1977–78	-	-	Matlock Town
1978–79	-	-	Altrincham
1979–80	-	-	Runcorn
1980–81	-	-	Runcorn
1981–82	Buxton	-	Gainsborough Trinity
1982–83	King's Lynn	-	Burton Albion
1983–84	Workington	-	Barrow
1984–85	Rhyl	-	Stafford Rangers
1985–86	Worksop Town	-	Gateshead
1986–87	Macclesfield Town	-	Bangor City
1987–88	South Liverpool	-	Chorley
1988–89	Bangor City	-	Mossley
1989–90	Fleetwood Town	-	Leek Town
1990–91	Witton Albion	-	Witton Albion
1991–92	Morecambe	-	Stalybridge Celtic
1992–93	Winsford United	-	Southport
1993–94	Guiseley	-	Marine
1994–95	Lancaster City	-	Marine
1995–96	Worksop Town	-	Hyde United
1996–97	Blyth Spartans	-	Gainsborough Trinity
1997–98	Runcorn	-	Altrincham
1998–99	Droylsden	-	Altrincham
1999–00	Trafford	Hyde United	Leigh RMI
2000–01	Stalybridge Celtic	Barrow	Stalybridge Celtic
2001–02	Barrow	Worksop Town	Accrington Stanley
2002–03	Stalybridge Celtic	Hucknall Town	Accrington Stanley
2003–04	Barrow	Hyde United	Droylsden
2004–05	Bamber Bridge	Kidsgrove Athletic	Hyde United
2005–06	Bradford Park Avenue	Blyth Spartans	Blyth Spartans
2006–07	Buxton	Guiseley	Burscough
2007–08	FC United of Manchester	Retford United	Fleetwood Town
2008–09	Trafford	Durham City	Eastwood Town
2009–10	Belper Town	Mickleover Sports	Guiseley
2010–11	Lancaster City	-	FC Halifax Town
2011–12	-	-	Chester
2012–13	-	-	Skelmersdale United
2013–14	-	-	Halesowen Town

== See also ==
- Isthmian League
- Southern League
