= Central Ground =

Demolished football stadium in Northwich, Cheshire, England

The Central Ground
- Full name: The Central Ground
- Location: Northwich, Cheshire, England
- Owner: Witton Albion
- Operator: Witton Albion
- Surface: Grass

Construction
- Opened: 1910
- Closed: 1 May 1989
- Demolished: 1989

Tenant
- Witton Albion (1910–1989)

The Central Ground was a football stadium in Northwich, Cheshire, which was the home ground of Witton Albion Football Club, between 1910 and 1 May 1989. A Sainsbury's supermarket now occupies the site.

== History ==
Witton Albion's first ground was adjacent to the Parish Church Vicarage. In 1897 and 1910, the club moved to Magdala Place. By 1910, the club moved to a new site near the Victoria Saw Mills on Witton Street. Over the next ten years, the club leased the land for £15 per year, and in July 1920, the club purchased the land outright for £750, and was renamed as the Central Ground.

In the 1960s, a small grandstand was constructed at the southern perimeter of the ground. The northern perimeter included a terrace area that ran the length of the pitch. The goal ends featured grass embankments with hooped metal railings.

Witton Albion sold the Central Ground to J Sainsbury PLC in 1989, and the football club moved to Wincham Park, a new ground in nearby Wincham later that year. The final match at the Central Ground was a 1–1 draw against Frickley Athletic on 1 May 1989. A new Sainsbury's store was erected on the site along with a new link road, Venables Road.
