= Ellesmere Port & Neston F.C. =

Ellesmere Port & Neston
- Full name: Ellesmere Port & Neston Football Club

Ellesmere Port & Neston F.C. was an English association football club.

== History ==
The club competed in the FA Vase during the 1980s, played in the Cheshire County League Division Two for the 1981–82 season and were founder members of North West Counties Football League in the 1982–83 season, playing in the league until 1988–89.

The club played at Ellesmere Port Stadium at one stage.

== Records ==
- Best FA Vase performance: 3rd Round – 1985–86
