= The Lamb Ground =

Football stadium in Tamworth, England

Coordinates: 52°37′43″N 1°41′20″W

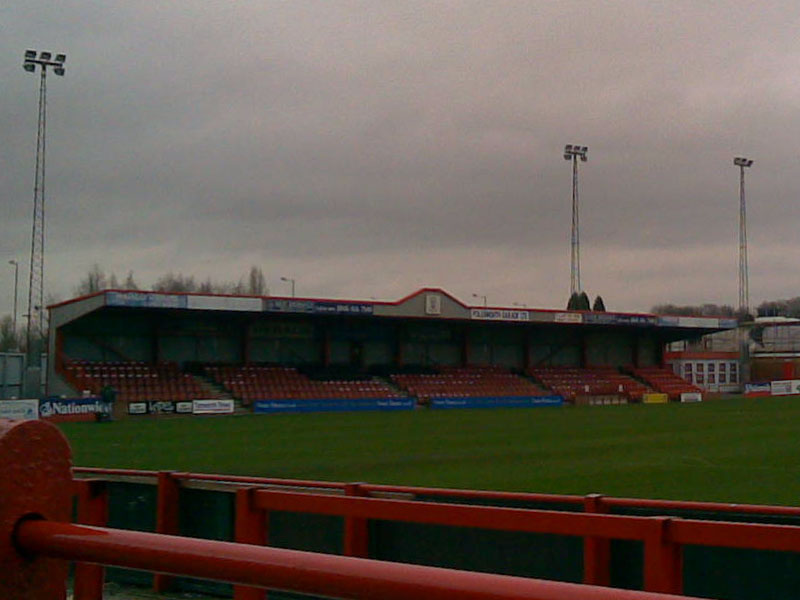
- Interactive map of The Lamb Ground
- Location: Kettlebrook Road; Tamworth; Staffordshire; B77 1AA
- Owner: Tamworth F.C.
- Operator: Tamworth F.C.
- Capacity: 4,000
- Surface: 3G

Construction
- Opened: 1934

Tenant
- Tamworth F.C. (1934–present)

The Lamb Ground is a football stadium in the district of Kettlebrook, in Tamworth, Staffordshire, England and is the home of Tamworth Football Club. It has a capacity of 4,000, and is approximately half a mile south of Tamworth railway station.

== History ==
Tamworth spent their first year as a football team at Jolly Sailor ground before making the short move across the River Tame to start the 1934–35 season in the Birmingham Combination at the Lamb Ground. Tamworth have continued to play at the same site ever since, steadily improving the facilities as the Lambs progressed up the non-league football pyramid.

The ground was named after the "Lamb Inn", which stood for many years at the entrance to what is now the ground's car park. The first known use of the site was as a pig farm at the turn of the 19th century. Before Tamworth arrived at the Lamb Ground it is believed that Kettlebrook Oakfield F.C. used the ground. In those early days, players had to change in the Lamb Inn and run down to the pitch, but facilities have been slowly built up to include changing rooms and a clubhouse, as well as 'cover' and seating for spectators.

In 1969 the Lamb Ground acquired its floodlights from Scarborough, (these floodlights have now been replaced). Gillingham were invited to play a friendly fixture to mark the official switch-on of the old floodlights owing to the Gills being Tamworth's first Football League opposition in the FA Cup. Construction of the current Main Stand took place in 1997.

The Main Stand holds 518 while the terraced "Shed" is home to the "Shed Choir" which sometimes provide the team with vocal support. Planning permission has been sought for a new 1,800 seater stand incorporating VIP boxes to take the place of the current Main Stand, its thought the current Main Stand would then be moved to the Castle End of the stadium.
