= Cheshire County League =

UK football league

- Founded: 1919
- First season: 1919-1920
- Folded: 1982
- Country: England
- Other club from: Wales
- Confederation: The Football Association
- Divisions: Division One; Division Two
- Number of clubs: 82
- Domestic cup: FA Trophy
- League cup: Cheshire Senior Cup
- Most championships: Macclesfield Town

The Cheshire County League was a football league founded in the north west of England in 1919, drawing its teams largely from Cheshire, surrounding English counties and North Wales.

Initially the league was dominated by the reserve teams of Football League clubs, but as the Central League became established for these teams, the non-league clubs won every title after 1938.

The outbreak of World War II in 1939 led to the league being split into Eastern and Western sections, with the winners of each playing for the overall championship in 1939–40, with the league then closing down for the duration of the combat until restarting in 1945.

In 1968, the league lost several clubs to the newly formed Northern Premier League. Despite this, the league expanded in 1978 by adding a Division Two, however in 1982, the league ceased to exist, after it merged with the Lancashire Combination to form the North West Counties Football League.

== Honours ==
=== League champions ===
Season	Champions
1919–20	Runcorn
1920–21	Winsford United
1921–22	Chester
1922–23	Crewe Alexandra reserves
1923–24	Crewe Alexandra reserves
1924–25	Port Vale reserves
1925–26	Chester
1926–27	Chester
1927–28	Port Vale reserves
1928–29	Port Vale reserves
1929–30	Port Vale reserves
1930–31	Port Vale reserves
1931–32	Macclesfield
1932–33	Macclesfield
1933–34	Wigan Athletic
1934–35	Wigan Athletic
1935–36	Wigan Athletic
1936–37	Runcorn
1937–38	Tranmere Rovers reserves
1938–39	Runcorn
1939–40	Runcorn
1940–45	No competition due to World War II
1945–46	Wellington Town
1946–47	Wellington Town
1947–48	Rhyl
1948–49	Witton Albion
1949–50	Witton Albion
1950–51	Rhyl
1951–52	Wellington Town
1952–53	Macclesfield Town
1953–54	Witton Albion
1954–55	Hyde United
1955–56	Hyde United
1956–57	Northwich Victoria
1957–58	Ellesmere Port Town
1958–59	Ellesmere Port Town
1959–60	Ellesmere Port Town
1960–61	Macclesfield Town
1961–62	Ellesmere Port Town
1962–63	Runcorn
1963–64	Macclesfield Town
1964–65	Wigan Athletic
1965–66	Altrincham
1966–67	Altrincham
1967–68	Macclesfield Town
1968–69	Skelmersdale United
1969–70	Skelmersdale United
1970–71	Rossendale United
1971–72	Rhyl
1972–73	Buxton
1973–74	Marine
1974–75	Leek Town
1975–76	Marine
1976–77	Winsford United
1977–78	Marine
1978–79	Horwich RMI
1979–80	Stalybridge Celtic
1980–81	Nantwich Town
1981–82	Hyde United

=== Division Two Champions ===
Season	Champions
1978–79	Bootle
1979–80	Prescot Town
1980–81	Accrington Stanley
1981–82	Congleton Town

== Members ==
During the league's history, 82 clubs and reserve teams played in the league:

- Accrington Stanley
- Altrincham
- Anson Villa
- Ashton National
- Ashton Town
- Ashton United
- Atherton Collieries
- Atherton Laburnum Rovers
- Bangor City
- Bootle
- Burscough
- Buxton
- Chester
- Chester Reserves
- Chorley
- Congleton Town
- Connah's Quay & Shotton
- Crewe Alexandra Reserves
- Curzon Ashton
- Darwen
- Droylsden
- Eastwood Hanley
- Eccles United
- Ellesmere Port & Neston
- Ellesmere Port Cement
- Ellesmere Port Town
- Fleetwood Town
- Ford Motors
- Formby
- Frickley Colliery
- Glossop
- Horwich RMI
- Hyde United
- Irlam Town
- Kirkby Town
- Leek Town
- Leyland Motors
- Macclesfield Town
- Maghull
- Manchester Central
- Manchester North End
- Marine
- Middlewich
- Middlewich Athletic
- Monk's Hall
- Mossley
- Nantwich Town
- New Brighton
- New Mills
- Northwich Victoria
- Oldham Athletic Reserves
- Ormskirk
- Oswestry Town
- Port Vale Reserves
- Prescot BI
- Prescot Cables
- Prestwich Heys
- Radcliffe Borough
- Rhyl
- Rossendale United
- Runcorn
- Salford
- Saltney Athletic
- Sandbach Ramblers
- Sankeys of Wellington
- Skelmersdale United
- South Liverpool
- St Helens Town
- Stafford Rangers
- Stalybridge Celtic
- Stalybridge Celtic Reserves
- Stockport County Reserves
- Tranmere Rovers Reserves
- Wallasey United
- Warrington Town
- Wellington Town
- Whitchurch
- Wigan Athletic
- Wigan Rovers
- Winsford United
- Witton Albion
- Wrexham Reserves
