= List of F.C. United of Manchester seasons =

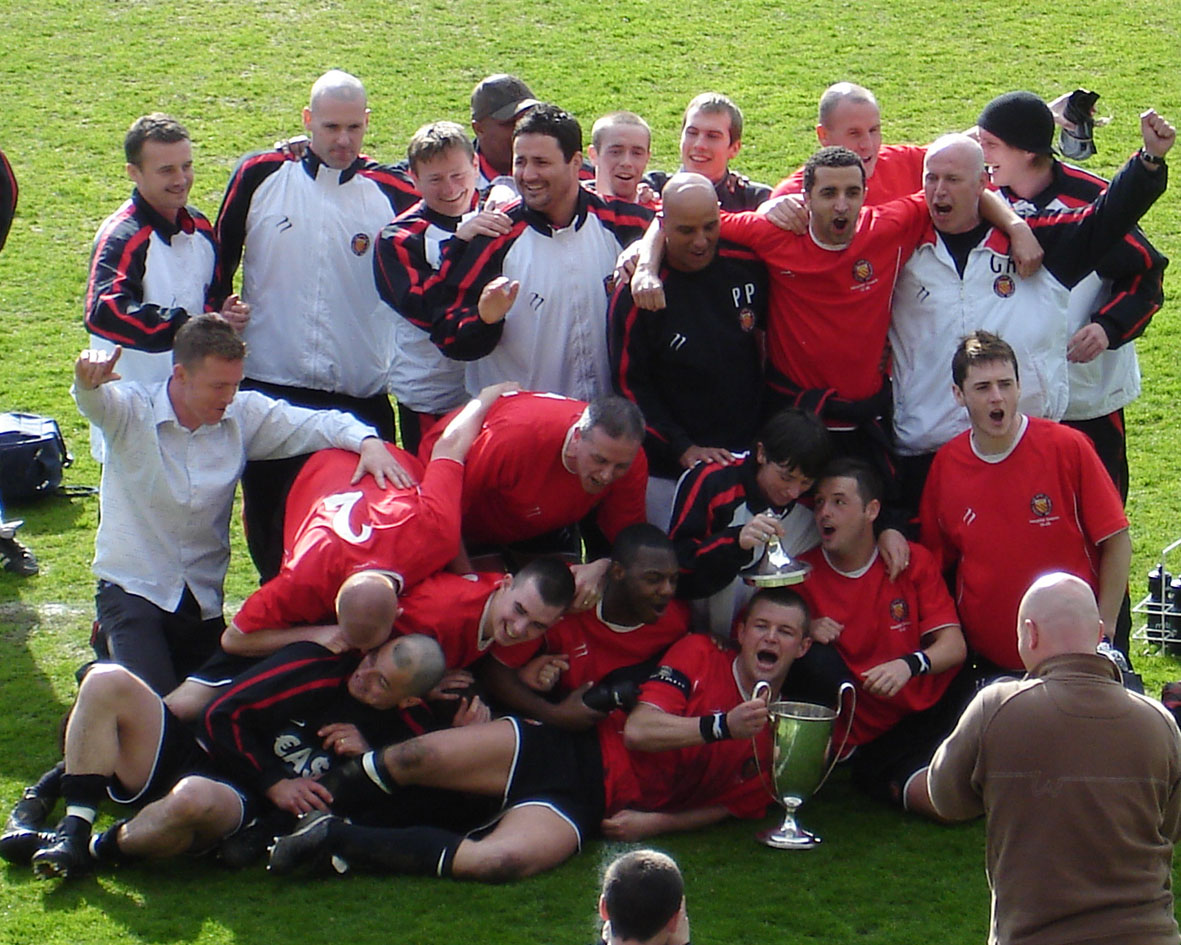
F.C. United celebrate becoming champions of the North West Counties Football League Division Two after the last game of their inaugural 2005–06 season.

F.C. United of Manchester is an English semi-professional association football club based in Moston, Manchester, that competes in the Northern Premier League Premier Division. The club was formed in June 2005 by supporters of Manchester United opposed to American businessman Malcolm Glazer's takeover of that club. F.C. United are owned and democratically run by their supporters and operate as a community benefit society on a one-member, one vote basis.

F.C. United were accepted into Division Two of the North West Counties Football League, at level ten of the English football pyramid, for the 2005–06 season. They achieved three consecutive promotions in the first three years of their existence and were promoted for a fourth time to compete in the National League North for the 2015–16 season. They were relegated to the Northern Premier League Premier Division 2019 where they continue to play.

F.C. United reached the second round of the FA Cup during the 2010–11 season, and the first round during the 2015–16 and 2020–21 seasons. The club also reached the fourth round of the FA Trophy during the 2014–15 season and the third round of the FA Vase during the 2006–07 season. In minor competitions, F.C. United won the FENIX Trophy in the 2021–22 and 2023–24 seasons, the Manchester Premier Cup during the 2016–17 and 2017–18 seasons, the North West Counties Football League Challenge Cup during the 2006–07 season, and the Northern Premier League President's Cup during the 2007–08 season.

From their formation to 2015, due to the lack of their own ground, F.C. United played their home matches at multiple stadia around Greater Manchester, including Bury's Gigg Lane, Curzon Ashton's Tameside Stadium and Stalybridge Celtic's Bower Fold, among others. The club moved into its own 4,400-capacity Broadhurst Park in north-east Manchester for the 2015–16 season.

== Key ==
The division is shown in italics when it changes due to promotion, relegation or league reorganisation.

Champions ↑	Promotion via play-offs ‡	Competition winners

Key to league record

- P = Games played
- W = Games won
- D = Games drawn
- L = Games lost
- F = Goals for
- A = Goals against
- GD = Goal Differential
- Pts = Points
- Pos = League position

Key to rounds

- DNE = Did not enter
- PR = Preliminary round
- QR1 = Qualifying round 1
- QR2 = Qualifying round 2
- QR3 = Qualifying round 3
- QR4 = Qualifying round 4
- R1 = Round 1
- R2 = Round 2
- R3 = Round 3
- R4 = Round 4
- QF = Quarter-finals
- SF = Semi-finals
- W = Winners

Key to goalscorers

- = Number of league goals scored

== Seasons ==
Results of league and cup competitions by season
Season	League											FA Cup	Other competitions		Top league goal scorer		Average home attendance	References
Season	Division	Level	P	W	D	L	F	A	GD	Pts	Pos	FA Cup	Other competitions		Name	Goal	Average home attendance	References
2005–06	North West Counties League; Division Two	10	36	27	6	3	111	35	+76	87	1st ↑ Champions	DNE	NWCFL Challenge Cup	R2	Rory Patterson	18	3,059	
2005–06	North West Counties League; Division Two	10	36	27	6	3	111	35	+76	87	1st ↑ Champions	DNE	Second Division Trophy	QF	Rory Patterson	18	3,059	
2006–07	North West Counties League; Division One	9	42	36	4	2	157	36	+121	112	1st ↑ Champions	DNE	FA Vase	R3	Stuart Rudd	38	2,581	
2006–07	North West Counties League; Division One	9	42	36	4	2	157	36	+121	112	1st ↑ Champions	DNE	NWCFL Challenge Cup	W	Stuart Rudd	38	2,581	
2007–08	Northern Premier League; Division One North	8	42	24	9	9	91	49	+42	81	2nd (Note: F.C. United of Manchester beat Skelmersdale United 4–1 in the Northern Premier League Division One North play-off final on 3 May 2008.); Promoted via Play-offs‡	QR1	FA Trophy	PR	Rory Patterson	35	2,086	
2007–08	Northern Premier League; Division One North	8	42	24	9	9	91	49	+42	81	2nd Promoted via Play-offs‡	QR1	NPL Challenge Cup	R1	Rory Patterson	35	2,086	
2007–08	Northern Premier League; Division One North	8	42	24	9	9	91	49	+42	81	2nd Promoted via Play-offs‡	QR1	NPL President's Cup	W	Rory Patterson	35	2,086	
2007–08	Northern Premier League; Division One North	8	42	24	9	9	91	49	+42	81	2nd Promoted via Play-offs‡	QR1	Manchester Premier Cup	SF	Rory Patterson	35	2,086	
2008–09	Northern Premier League; Premier Division	7	42	21	9	12	82	58	+24	72	6th	QR1	FA Trophy	QR3	Kyle Wilson	21	2,152	
2008–09	Northern Premier League; Premier Division	7	42	21	9	12	82	58	+24	72	6th	QR1	NPL Challenge Cup	R3	Kyle Wilson	21	2,152	
2009–10	Northern Premier League; Premier Division	7	38	13	8	17	62	65	–3	47	13th	QR4	FA Trophy	QR3	Phil Marsh	10	1,954	
2009–10	Northern Premier League; Premier Division	7	38	13	8	17	62	65	–3	47	13th	QR4	NPL Challenge Cup	R3	Phil Marsh	10	1,954	
2010–11	Northern Premier League; Premier Division	7	42	24	4	14	76	53	+23	76	4th (Note: F.C. United of Manchester were defeated 1–0 by Colwyn Bay in the Northern Premier League Premier Division play-off final on 2 May 2011.)	R2	FA Trophy	QR3	Michael Norton	24	1,966	
2010–11	Northern Premier League; Premier Division	7	42	24	4	14	76	53	+23	76	4th	R2	NPL Challenge Cup	R3	Michael Norton	24	1,966	
2011–12	Northern Premier League; Premier Division	7	42	21	9	12	83	51	+32	72	6th (Note: F.C. United of Manchester were defeated 1–0 by Bradford Park Avenue in the Northern Premier League Premier Division play-off final on 6 May 2012.)	QR2	FA Trophy	R1	Matthew Wolfenden	20	1,947	
2011–12	Northern Premier League; Premier Division	7	42	21	9	12	83	51	+32	72	6th	QR2	NPL Challenge Cup	QF	Matthew Wolfenden	20	1,947	
2011–12	Northern Premier League; Premier Division	7	42	21	9	12	83	51	+32	72	6th	QR2	Manchester Premier Cup	R1	Matthew Wolfenden	20	1,947	
2012–13	Northern Premier League; Premier Division	7	42	25	8	9	86	48	+38	83	3rd (Note: F.C. United of Manchester were defeated 2–1 by Hednesford Town in the Northern Premier League Premier Division play-off final on 11 May 2013.)	QR4	FA Trophy	QR2	Matthew Wolfenden	19	1,849	
2012–13	Northern Premier League; Premier Division	7	42	25	8	9	86	48	+38	83	3rd	QR4	NPL Challenge Cup	R4	Matthew Wolfenden	19	1,849	
2012–13	Northern Premier League; Premier Division	7	42	25	8	9	86	48	+38	83	3rd	QR4	Manchester Premier Cup	R1	Matthew Wolfenden	19	1,849	
2013–14	Northern Premier League; Premier Division	7	46	29	9	8	108	52	+56	96	2nd (Note: F.C. United of Manchester were defeated 2–1 by Ashton United in the Northern Premier League Premier Division play-off semi-final on 29 April 2014.)	QR1	FA Trophy	QR1	Tom Greaves	34	1,944	
2013–14	Northern Premier League; Premier Division	7	46	29	9	8	108	52	+56	96	2nd	QR1	NPL Challenge Cup	QF	Tom Greaves	34	1,944	
2013–14	Northern Premier League; Premier Division	7	46	29	9	8	108	52	+56	96	2nd	QR1	Manchester Premier Cup	R1	Tom Greaves	34	1,944	
2014–15	Northern Premier League; Premier Division	7	46	26	14	6	78	37	+41	92	1st ↑ Champions	QR2	FA Trophy	R4	Tom Greaves	20	2,155	
2014–15	Northern Premier League; Premier Division	7	46	26	14	6	78	37	+41	92	1st ↑ Champions	QR2	NPL Challenge Cup	R1	Tom Greaves	20	2,155	
2014–15	Northern Premier League; Premier Division	7	46	26	14	6	78	37	+41	92	1st ↑ Champions	QR2	Manchester Premier Cup	R1	Tom Greaves	20	2,155	
2015–16	National League; North	6	42	15	8	19	60	75	–15	53	13th	R1	FA Trophy	QR3	George Thomson	11	3,394	
2015–16	National League; North	6	42	15	8	19	60	75	–15	53	13th	R1	Manchester Premier Cup	R2	George Thomson	11	3,394	
2016–17	National League; North	6	42	14	12	16	69	68	+1	54	13th	QR3	FA Trophy	QR3	George Thomson	15	2,667	
2016–17	National League; North	6	42	14	12	16	69	68	+1	54	13th	QR3	Manchester Premier Cup	W	George Thomson	15	2,667	
2017–18	National League; North	6	42	14	8	20	58	72	–14	50	16th	QR4	FA Trophy	QR3	Jason Gilchrist	11	2,109	
2017–18	National League; North	6	42	14	8	20	58	72	–14	50	16th	QR4	Manchester Premier Cup	W	Jason Gilchrist	11	2,109	
2018–19	National League; North	6	42	8	10	24	49	82	−33	34	21st ↓ Relegated	QR3	FA Trophy Manchester Premier Cup	QR3 QF	Kurt Willoughby	18	1,943	
2019–20 (Note: This season was cancelled and declared void due to the COVID-19 pandemic. Statistics shown are as things stood when the season was cancelled.)	Northern Premier League; Premier Division	7	32	16	9	7	73	51	+22	57	2nd	QR2	FA Trophy Manchester Premier Cup	R2 F (Note: The final was not played this season due to the COVID-19 pandemic. F.C. United was set to play in the final.)	Tunde Owolabi	28	1,668	
2020–21	Northern Premier League; Premier Division	7	7	2	4	1	9	7	+2	10	13th	R1	FA Trophy	3QR	Michael Fowler, Dan Cockerline, Finlay Sinclair-Smith	2	505 (Note: Due to the COVID-19 pandemic, attendances were limited to 600 people.)	
2021–22	Northern Premier League; Premier Division	7	42	18	7	17	66	57	+9	61	9th	QR2	FA Trophy	R1	Regan Linney	14	1,795	
2021–22	Northern Premier League; Premier Division	7	42	18	7	17	66	57	+9	61	9th	QR2	FENIX Trophy	W	Regan Linney	14	1,795	
2022–23	Northern Premier League; Premier Division	7	42	19	9	14	68	48	+20	63	8th	QR2	FA Trophy	QR3	Regan Linney	20	1,731	
2022–23	Northern Premier League; Premier Division	7	42	19	9	14	68	48	+20	63	8th	QR2	FENIX Trophy	3rd	Regan Linney	20	1,731	
2023–24	Northern Premier League; Premier Division	7	40	15	4	21	55	77	–22	48	14th	QR2	FA Trophy	R1	Dontai Gabidon	7	1,681	
2023–24	Northern Premier League; Premier Division	7	40	15	4	21	55	77	–22	48	14th	QR2	FENIX Trophy	W	Dontai Gabidon	7	1,681	
2024–25	Northern Premier League; Premier Division	7	42	12	15	15	55	62	–7	51	17th	QR1	FA Trophy	R1	Adam Le Fondre	16	1,667	
2024–25	Northern Premier League; Premier Division	7	42	12	15	15	55	62	–7	51	17th	QR1	FENIX Trophy	2nd	Adam Le Fondre	16	1,667	
2025–26	Northern Premier League; Premier Division	7	40	21	9	10	65	41	+24	72	3rd (Note: F.C. United of Manchester were defeated 3–2 by Warrington Rylands in the Northern Premier League Premier Division play-off semi-final on 28 April 2026.)	QR2	FA Trophy	R3	Adam Le Fondre	15	1,889	
2025–26	Northern Premier League; Premier Division	7	40	21	9	10	65	41	+24	72	3rd	QR2	Manchester Premier Cup	R1	Adam Le Fondre	15	1,889	
