= 2023–24 Fenix Trophy =

2023–24 FENIX Trophy
Tournament details
- Dates: 24 October 2023 – 12 May 2024
- Teams: 12 (from 11 associations)

Final positions
- Champions: (England) F.C. United of Manchester (2nd title)
- Runners-up: (Czech Republic) Prague Raptors

Tournament statistics
- Matches played: 26
- Goals scored: 105 (4.04 per match)
- Top scorer(s): Aaron Bennett (FC United of Manchester); 6 goals
- All statistics correct as of 20 April 2026.

The 2023–24 Fenix Trophy was the third season of the Fenix Trophy, a continental European football tournament for non-professional European teams.

The UEFA-sanctioned competition consisted of 12 teams split into four groups of three. The four group winners qualified for the knockout stage which was held at Tre Stelle-Francesco Ghizzi, in Desenzano del Garda, Italy in May 2024. All matches were streamed on the FENIX Trophy YouTube channel.

Skjold were the defending champions, but were eliminated in the group stage. The final was played on 12 May 2024. It was won by F.C. United of Manchester, who defeated Prague Raptors 4–0 to claim their second title.

== Teams ==
12 teams were invited to compete in this seasons competition. Brera Calcio who competed in the first two editions decided not to compete this year and rather, focus on running the tournament. The confirmed teams were as follows:

- (Belgium) KSK Beveren (Beveren)
- (Denmark) BK Skjold (Copenhagen)
- (England) FC United of Manchester (Manchester)
- (Czech Republic) Prague Raptors (Prague)
- (Poland) Kraków Dragoons FC (Kraków)
- (Romania) FC Venus București (Bucharest)
- (France) Vinsky FC (Paris)
- (Norway) Gamle Oslo FK (Oslo)
- (Finland) Gilla FC (Helsinki)
- (England) Enfield Town FC (Enfield)
- (England) Lewes FC (Lewes)
- (Wales) Llantwit Major FC (Llantwit Major)

== Group stage ==
=== Group A ===
Pos	Team	Pld	W	D	L	GF	GA	GD	Pts	Qualification
1	(England) Enfield Town	4	3	1	0	10	4	+6	10	Knockout stage
2	(Wales) Llantwit Major	4	1	1	2	6	7	−1	4	
3	(Denmark) Skjold	4	1	0	3	5	10	−5	3	

Updated to match(es) played on 24 April 2024. Source: FENIX
28 November 2023

Enfield Town (England)	3–1	(Denmark) Skjold
Youngs 35', 85'; Wyllie 90+4'	Report	Sonico 80'

Queen Elizabeth II Stadium, London
17 February 2024
15:00

Llantwit Major (Wales)	1–0	(Denmark) Skjold
Kimmins 55'	Report

Lon Melin Wynt, Llantwit Major
5 March 2024

Skjold (Denmark)	1–4	(England) Enfield Town
Skoning 88'	Report	Youngs 20', 67'; Taaffee 38'; Wylllie 43'

Osterbro Stadion, Copenhagen
19 March 2024
19:45

Enfield Town (England)	3–2	(Wales) Llantwit Major
Otote 17'; Alves 83'; Cass 85'	Report	Morgan 80'; Williams 90+2'

Queen Elizabeth II Stadium, London
9 April 2024
17:00

Llantwit Major (Wales)	1–1	(England) Enfield Town
Kelly 14'	Report	Hippolyte 70'

Lon Melin Wynt, Llantwit Major
24 April 2024

Sjold (Denmark)	3–2	(Wales) Llantwit Major
Vega 52'; Lysemose 56'; Taj 76'	Report	Morgan 29'; Kimmins 46'

Osterbro Stadion, Copenhagen

=== Group B ===
Pos	Team	Pld	W	D	L	GF	GA	GD	Pts	Qualification
1	(Czech Republic) Prague Raptors	4	4	0	0	12	4	+8	12	Knockout stage
2	(Finland) Gilla	4	2	0	2	17	9	+8	6	
3	(Romania) Venus București	4	0	0	4	3	19	−16	0	

Updated to match(es) played on 25 April 2024. Source: FENIX
24 October 2023
19:30

Prague Raptors (Czech Republic)	4–1	(Romania) Venus București
Tarasenko 52', 80'; Darvishi 65'; Sabater 85'	Report	Caraian 90'

Zlicin Arena, Prague
18 November 2023
14:00

Gilla (Finland)	2–4	(Czech Republic) Prague Raptors
Mettala 2'; Tammilehto 33'	Report	Cabranes 30', 63'; Darvishi 56'; Rizzi 76'

Bolt Arena, Helsinki
6 March 2024

Venus București (Romania)	0–1	(Czech Republic) Prague Raptors
	Report	Tonchev 10'

Stadionul Biruinta, Bucharest
10 April 2024

Venus București (Romania)	1–2	(Finland) Gilla
Lapadovici 2'	Report	Mettala 12'; Kiiskinen 22'

Stadionul Biruinta, Bucharest
16 April 2024

Gilla (Finland)	12–1	(Romania) Venus București
Mettala 7', 32', 72'; Rannisto 11'; Hetemaj 18', 27', 37'; Tammilehto 50'; Liivik 64'; Yaghoubi 75'; Brand 80'; Back 88'	Report	Florea 73'

Tammelan Stadion, Tampere
25 April 2024

Prague Raptors (Czech Republic)	3–1	(Finland) Gilla
Skilling 10'; Houdek 45', 78'	Report	Yaghoubi

Přední Kopanina, Prague

=== Group C ===
Pos	Team	Pld	W	D	L	GF	GA	GD	Pts	Qualification
1	(England) F.C. United of Manchester	4	4	0	0	26	2	+24	12	Knockout stage
2	(Poland) Kraków Dragoons	4	1	0	3	5	20	−15	3	
3	(France) Vinsky	4	1	0	3	3	12	−9	2 (Note: Vinsky FC were deducted one point for fielding an illegible player.)	

Updated to match(es) played on 10 April 2024. Source: FENIX
Notes:
25 October 2023
20:15

Kraków Dragoons (Poland)	1–2	(France) Vinsky
Sassini 77'	Report	Bouaziz 85'; Semedo 88'

KS Pradniczanka, Kraków
6 November 2023
20:15

Kraków Dragoons (Poland)	1–4	(England) F.C. United of Manchester
Lemmen 50'	Report	Bollado 12', 76'; Ennis 65'; Gabidon 85'

KS Pradniczanka, Kraków
Attendance: 230
13 February 2024
20:45

F.C. United of Manchester (England)	4–1	(France) Vinsky
Woodcock 53'; Oliver 82', 90'; Munro 90+4'	Report	Berriah 40'

Broadhurst Park, Manchester
Attendance: 406
9 March 2024
17:15

F.C. United of Manchester (England)	14–0	(Poland) Kraków Dragoons
Munro 8', 17', 89'; Bennett 13', 39', 66', 69', 87'; Jones 15'; Ferguson 55'; McLoughlin 60'; Jammeh 80'; Swales 85'; Gilboy 86'	Report

Broadhurst Park, Manchester
Attendance: 571
10 April 2024

Vinsky (France)	0–4	(England) F.C. United of Manchester
	Report	McLoughlin 36'; Ennis 55'; Gilboy 82'; Askew 85'

Complexe Sportif Firmin Riffaud, Magnanville
NA

Vinsky (France)	0–3 (w/o)	(Poland) Kraków Dragoons
	Report

=== Group D ===
Pos	Team	Pld	W	D	L	GF	GA	GD	Pts	Qualification
1	(England) Lewes	4	3	1	0	9	2	+7	10	Knockout stage
2	(Norway) Gamle Oslo	4	1	1	2	4	3	+1	4	
3	(Belgium) Beveren	4	1	0	3	2	10	−8	3	

Updated to match(es) played on 20 March 2024. Source: FENIX
26 October 2023
20:45

Beveren (Belgium)	1–0	(Norway) Gamle Oslo
Dahmany 65'	Report

Lindenlaan G Terrein, Beveren
7 November 2023
20:45

Lewes (England)	1–0	(Norway) Gamle Oslo
Lumbombo Kalala 15'	Report

The Dripping Pan, Lewes
Attendance: 1,109
12 December 2023

Beveren (Belgium)	1–3	(England) Lewes
Pieren 75'	Report	Dreher 16'; Lumbombo Kalala 21'; Penney 80'

Lindenlaan G Terrein, Beveren
27 February 2024
19:45

Lewes (England)	4–0	(Belgium) Beveren
Wood 4'; Ogunwamide 58'; Sablier 78'; Gondoh 84'	Report

The Dripping Pan, Lewes
Attendance: 944
20 March 2024

Gamle Oslo (Norway)	1–1	(England) Lewes
Skar-Lentze 50'	Report	Murtagh 58'

Bjolsen Kunstgress, Oslo
NA

Gamle Oslo (Norway)	3–0 (w/o)	(Belgium) Beveren
	Report

== Knockout stage ==
=== Bracket ===
Semi-finals
10 May – Desenzano del Garda
(England) Lewes	0
(England) F.C. United of Manchester	1
10 May – Desenzano del Garda
(Czech Republic) Prague Raptors (p)	0 (13)
(England) Enfield Town	0 (12)

Final
12 May – Desenzano del Garda
(England) F.C. United of Manchester	4
(Czech Republic) Prague Raptors	0
Third place
12 May – Desenzano del Garda
(England) Lewes	2
(England) Enfield Town	1

=== Semi-finals ===
10 May 2024
18:30

Lewes (England)	0–1	(England) F.C. United of Manchester
	Report	Ferguson 54'

Tre Stelle-Francesco Ghizzi, Desenzano del Garda
10 May 2024
21:00

Prague Raptors (Czech Republic)	0–0	(England) Enfield Town
	Report
Penalties
	13–12

Tre Stelle-Francesco Ghizzi, Desenzano del Garda

=== Third place play-off ===
12 May 2024
14:00

Lewes (England)	2–1	(England) Enfield Town
Tamplin 10'; Whelpdale 90'	Report	Onyeajwara 66'

Tre Stelle-Francesco Ghizzi, Desenzano del Garda

=== Final ===
12 May 2024
16:30

F.C. United of Manchester (England)	4–0	(Czech Republic) Prague Raptors
Jones 35'; Bennett 45'; Gabidon 60'; Gilboy 75'	Report

Tre Stelle-Francesco Ghizzi, Desenzano del Garda
