= Joe Ferguson (footballer) =

English footballer

Personal information
- Full name: Joseph Simatupang Ferguson
- Date of birth: 12 December 2002 (age 23)
- Place of birth: Manchester, England
- Height: 1.81 m (5 ft 11 in)
- Position: Right-back

Team information
- Current team: Connah's Quay Nomads
- Number: 22

Youth career
- 2014–2021: Blackburn Rovers

Senior career*
Years	Team	Apps	(Gls)
2021–2022	Blackburn Rovers	0	(0)
2021–2022	→ Witton Albion (loan)	9	(0)
2022	Matlock Town	0	(0)
2022–2024	Marine	31	(1)
2024–2025	F.C. United of Manchester	45	(3)
2025–?	Runcorn Linnets	25	(0)
2026–	Connah's Quay Nomads	15	(3)
- * Club domestic league appearances and goals as of 06:35, 7 November 2026 (UTC)

Joseph Simatupang Ferguson (born 12 December 2002) is an English footballer who plays as a right-back for Connah's Quay Nomads.

== Early and personal life ==
Born in Manchester, Ferguson is of Batak descent through his Indonesian mother. He has expressed his desire to represent Indonesia at international level, and met with the Ambassador of Indonesia to the United Kingdom, Desra Percaya, in April 2022 to discuss this possibility.

== Club career ==
Ferguson joined the Blackburn Rovers at the age of eleven. He signed a scholarship contract in 2019, at the age of sixteen.

In December 2021, Ferguson joined Northern Premier League side Witton Albion on a one-month loan deal. After impressing, this loan was extended into February 2022.

He was released by Blackburn Rovers at the end of the 2021–22 season. He then signed for Matlock Town, where he did not make a competitive appearance before signing for Marine. He left Marine in February 2024.

Ferguson signed for F.C. United of Manchester shortly after leaving Marine.

Joe became the first signing under new Linnets' manager Brad Cooke, and scored his first goal for the club in a 3–2 victory. The goal, an overhead kick, won Ferguson the goal of the season at the Linnets annual awards ceremony.

In summer 2026 he moved to Cymru Premier side Connah's Quay Nomads.

== International career ==
Ferguson contacted the Indonesian FA ahead of the 2021 FIFA U-20 World Cup, which was due to be hosted in Indonesia, to see if he could represent the Indonesian team at the competition. However, the tournament was cancelled due to the COVID-19 pandemic.

== Career statistics ==
=== Club ===
As of 29 November 2025.

Club	Season	League			Cup		Other		Total	
Club	Season	Division	Apps	Goals	Apps	Goals	Apps	Goals	Apps	Goals
Blackburn Rovers	2021–22	EFL Championship	0	0	0	0	0	0	0	0
Witton Albion (loan)	2021–22	Northern Premier League	9	0	0	0	0	0	9	0
Matlock Town	2022–23	Northern Premier League	0	0	0	0	0	0	0	0
Marine	2022–23	Northern Premier League	31	1	0	0	1 (Note: Appearances in FA Trophy qualification)	0	32	1
F.C. United of Manchester	2023–24	Northern Premier League	16	2	0	0	0	0	16	2
F.C. United of Manchester	2024–25	Northern Premier League	29	1	0	0	0	0	29	1
Runcorn Linnets	2024–25	Northern Premier League	7	0	0	0	0	0	7	0
Runcorn Linnets	2025–26	Northern Premier League	18	0	4	0	0	0	22	0
Career total			110	4	4	0	1	0	115	4

== Honours ==
F.C. United of Manchester

- Fenix Trophy: 2023–24
