= Charlie Oliver (English footballer) =

English footballer

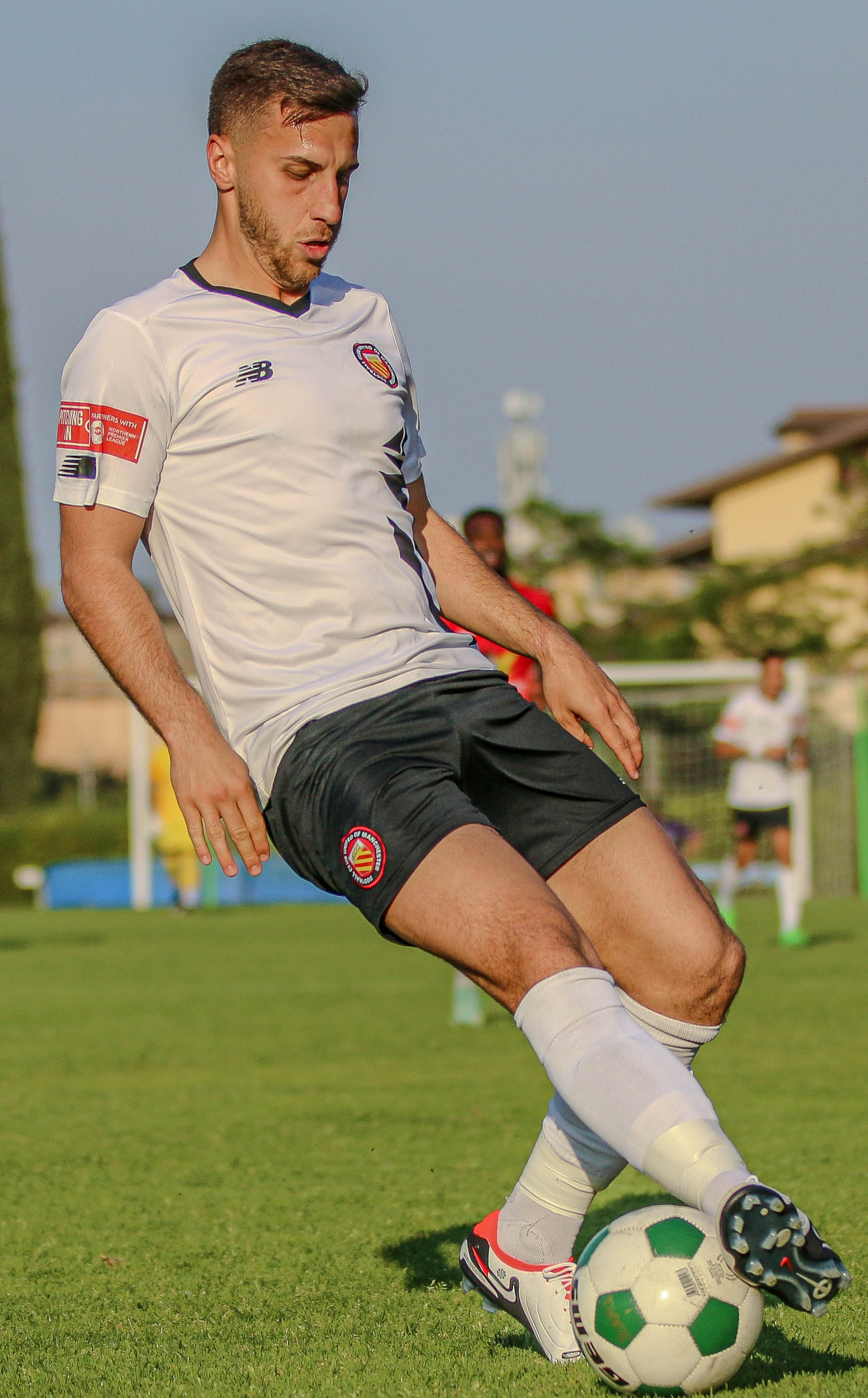
- Oliver playing for F.C. United of Manchester in 2024.

Personal information
- Full name: Charles William Corrigan Oliver
- Date of birth: 17 November 1997 (age 28)
- Place of birth: Trafford, England
- Height: 1.85 m (6 ft 1 in)
- Position: Defender

Team information
- Current team: F.C. United of Manchester

Youth career
- 2005–2016: Manchester City

Senior career*
Years	Team	Apps	(Gls)
2016–2019	Manchester City	0	(0)
2018	→ Fleetwood Town (loan)	1	(0)
2018–2019	→ Brentford (loan)	0	(0)
2019–2023	Southport	90	(4)
2023–2025	F.C. United of Manchester	49	(2)
- * Club domestic league appearances and goals as of 11:39, 9 August 2025 (UTC)

Charles William Corrigan Oliver (born 17 November 1997) is an English semi-professional footballer who last played for Northern Premier League Premier Division club F.C. United of Manchester as a defender.

Oliver is a product of the Manchester City Academy and began his professional career with the club. Following loan spells with Fleetwood Town and Brentford, he dropped into non-League football in 2019.

== Career ==
=== Manchester City ===
A defender, Oliver joined the Manchester City Academy at the age of 8. He progressed to sign a professional contract at the age of 18 and broke into the EDS. He made three appearances during the EDS' 2017–18 EFL Trophy campaign and on 31 January 2018, joined League One club Fleetwood Town on loan until the end of the 2017–18 season. He made the first professional appearance of his career three days later, as a substitute for Conor McAleny after 44 minutes of a 3–2 defeat to Scunthorpe United. It proved to be the only appearance of Oliver's spell, as he dropped out of the first team squad after the appointment of new head coach John Sheridan on 22 February 2018. Oliver played for the Development Squad in its run to the 2018 Lancashire Senior Cup Final and departed Highbury when his loan expired.

On 31 August 2018, Oliver joined the B team at Championship club Brentford on loan until 1 January 2019. He made 15 appearances for the B team before the expiration of his loan. He departed Manchester City at the end of 2018–19 season, when his contract expired.

=== Southport ===
On 15 November 2019, Oliver joined National League North club Southport on a free transfer. He remained at Haig Avenue until his release at the end of the 2022–23 season, by which time he had made 120 appearances and scored four goals. Oliver was a part of the club's 2021–22 and 2022–23 Lancashire FA Challenge Trophy-winning squads.

=== F.C. United of Manchester ===
On 6 July 2023, Oliver transferred to Northern Premier League Premier Division club F.C. United of Manchester. He made 47 appearances and scored two goals during a mid-table 2023–24 season and was a part of the Fenix Trophy-winning squad. Oliver was retained for the 2024–25 season and made 17 appearances prior to suffering a season-ending injury in November 2024.

== Personal life ==
Oliver attended St Bede's College.

== Career statistics ==
As of match played 26 April 2025

Appearances and goals by club, season and competition
Club	Season	League			National cup (Note: Includes FA Cup)		Other		Total	
Club	Season	Division	Apps	Goals	Apps	Goals	Apps	Goals	Apps	Goals
Manchester City EDS	2017–18	—					3 (Note: Appearances in EFL Trophy)	0	3	0
Fleetwood Town (loan)	2017–18	League One	1	0	—		—		1	0
Southport	2019–20	National League North	15	0	—		4 (Note: 3 appearances in FA Trophy, 1 appearance in Liverpool Senior Cup)	0	19	0
Southport	2020–21	—			2	0	3 (Note: Appearances in FA Trophy)	0	5	0
Southport	2021–22	National League North	40	1	5	0	7 (Note: 4 appearances in Lancashire FA Challenge Trophy, 3 appearances in FA Trophy)	0	52	1
Southport	2022–23	National League North	35	3	1	0	8 (Note: 5 appearances in Lancashire FA Challenge Trophy, 3 appearances in Liverpool Senior Cup)	0	44	3
Southport	Total		90	4	8	0	22	0	120	4
F.C. United of Manchester	2023–24	Northern Premier League Premier Division	36	2	2	0	9 (Note: 6 appearances and 2 goals in Fenix Trophy, 2 appearances in FA Trophy, 1 appearance in Manchester Premier Cup)	2	47	4
F.C. United of Manchester	2024–25	Northern Premier League Premier Division	13	0	1	0	3 (Note: 2 appearances in FA Trophy, 1 appearance in Fenix Trophy)	0	17	0
F.C. United of Manchester	Total		49	2	3	0	12	2	64	4
Career total			140	6	11	0	37	2	188	8

== Honours ==
Southport

- Lancashire FA Challenge Trophy: 2021–22, 2022–23

F.C. United of Manchester

- Fenix Trophy: 2023–24

Individual

- Southport Player of the Month: October 2022
