= FENIX Trophy =

Fenix Trophy
- Founded: 2021
- Abolished: 2025
- Region: Europe
- Teams: Varied (16 2024–25)
- Last champions: (Scotland) Caledonian Braves (1st title)
- Most championships: (England) F.C. United of Manchester (2 titles)
- Website: fenixtrophy.eu

The Fenix Trophy was an annual football competition for semi-professional and amateur European clubs. The competition was officially recognised by UEFA.

First contested in the 2021–22 season, the word FENIX is an acronym and stands for Friendly, European, Non-professional, Innovative, and Xenial (From the ancient Greek xenos, the word examined for an attitude of resistance to strangers, with maintaining mutual respect for cultural differences).

A spiritual successor, European Grassroots Trophy, was announced for the 2026/27 season.

== History ==
The Fenix Trophy was originally envisioned by Alessandro Aleotti, chairman of Italian club Brera Calcio. The competition was first contested during the 2021–22 season, with the first match taking place on 21 September 2021, between German club HFC Falke and Czech club Prague Raptors. The first final took place on 11 June 2022, between Prague Raptors and F.C. United of Manchester, with F.C. United of Manchester being crowned the inaugural champions.

While the competition's eligibility criteria allows all clubs to compete on a similar level, the diversity of club history quickly became apparent, with many clubs founded in recent years, others have a long history that includes professional football. Examples from the competition's early history include Beveren, a Belgian club notable for having played professional European football, most recently in the 2004–05 UEFA Cup, and Venus București, winners of the Romanian Liga I on seven occasions.

The number of teams was increased to nine for the 2022–23 season, with Danish club BK Skjold winning the competition. For the 2023–24 season the number of teams was again increased to twelve, with F.C. United of Manchester winning their second title.

=== Season 2021–22 ===
The final was played on 11 June 2022. Participant teams (8):

- (Germany) HFC Falke (Hamburg)
- (Italy) AS Lodigiani (Rome)
- (Spain) CD Cuenca-Mestallistes (Valencia)
- (Czech Republic) Prague Raptors (Prague)
- (Italy) Brera Calcio (Milan)
- (England) FC United of Manchester (Manchester)
- (Netherlands) AFC DWS (Amsterdam)
- (Poland) AKS Zły (Warszawa)

=== Season 2022–23 ===
The final was played on 5 June 2023. Participant teams (12):

- (Belgium) K.S.K. Beveren (Beveren)
- (Denmark) BK Skjold (Skjold)
- (Spain) CD Cuenca-Mestallistes (Valencia)
- (Czech Republic) Prague Raptors (Prague)
- (Italy) Brera Calcio (Milan)
- (England) FC United of Manchester (Manchester)
- (England) Lewes FC (Lewes)
- (England) Enfield Town FC (London)
- (France) Vinsky (Paris)
- (Netherlands) AFC DWS (Amsterdam)
- (Poland) Kraków Dragoons FC (Kraków)
- (Serbia) FK Miljakovac (Belgrade)

=== Season 2024–25 ===
The final was played on 11 May 2025. Participant teams (16):

- (Poland) Kraków Dragoons FC (Kraków)
- (Czech Republic) Prague Raptors (Prague)
- (Belgium) K. Berchem Sport (Antwerp)
- (England) F.C. United of Manchester (Manchester)
- (Norway) Gamle Oslo FK (Oslo)
- (Germany) Buchholzer FC (Buchholz)
- (Poland) Klub Piłkarski Bór Oborniki Śląskie (Oborniki Śląskie)
- (Denmark) BK Skjold (Copenhagen)
- (England) Avro F.C. (Oldham)
- (Finland) Gilla FC (Helsinki)
- (Italy) Brera Calcio (Milan)
- (Wales) Llantwit Major F.C. (Llantwit Major)
- (Scotland) Caledonian Braves F.C. (Glasgow)
- (Serbia) FK Miljakovac (Belgrade)
- (Montenegro) Fans United FC (Podgorica)
- (Germany) Athletic Sonnenberg (Chemnitz)

== Format ==
=== Qualification ===
Semi-professional and amateur teams from across Europe are invited to play in the competition based on exceptional social, historical and cultural significance.

=== Tournament ===
The first tournament consisted of two groups of four teams, with the two group winners qualifying for the final. With the addition of a ninth team for the 2022–23 season, the tournament consisted of three groups of three teams, with the winners of each group and the highest ranked second-placed team advancing to the knockout stage. The 2023–24 tournament consisted of twelve teams split into four groups of three, with the four group winners qualifying for the knockout stage. The 2024–25 tournament consisted of 16 teams with the preliminary stage consisting of a knock-out tournament with two-legged home and away ties, over two rounds, in which every club will face its opponents home and away.

== List of finals ==
Key
†	Match was won during extra time
*	Match was won on a penalty shoot-out

- The "Season" column refers to the season the competition was held, and wikilinks to the article about that season.
- The wikilinks in the "Score" column point to the article about that season's final game.

List of Fenix Trophy finals
Season	Country	Winners	Score	Runners-up	Country	Venue	Attendance
2021–22	England	F.C. United of Manchester	2–0	Prague Raptors	Czech Republic	Stadio Romeo Neri, Rimini, Italy	
2022–23	Denmark	BK Skjold	3–0	Prague Raptors	Czech Republic	San Siro, Milan, Italy	
2023–24	England	F.C. United of Manchester	4–0	Prague Raptors	Czech Republic	Stadio Tre Stelle, Desenzano del Garda, Italy	
2024–25	Scotland	Caledonian Braves	3–1	F.C. United of Manchester	England	Stadio Comunale G. De Rossi, Lake Iseo, Italy	

== Records and statistics ==
=== Performances by club ===
Performance in the Fenix Trophy by club
Club	Winners	Runners-up	Years won	Years runners-up
(England) F.C. United of Manchester	2	1	2022, 2024	2025
(Denmark) BK Skjold	1	0	2023	—
(Scotland) Caledonian Braves	1	0	2025	—
(Czech Republic) Prague Raptors	0	3	—	2022, 2023, 2024

=== Participation by club ===
Nation	No.	Clubs	Seasons
England (4)	4	F.C. United of Manchester	2021–22, 2022–23, 2023–24, 2024–25
England (4)	1	Enfield Town	2023–24
England (4)	1	Lewes	2023–24
England (4)	1	Avro	2024–25
Poland (3)	3	Kraków Dragoons	2022–23, 2023–24, 2024–25
Poland (3)	1	Bór Oborniki Śląskie	2024–25
Poland (3)	1	AKS Zły	2021–22
Germany (3)	1	HFC Falke	2021–22
Germany (3)	1	Buchholzer FC	2024–25
Germany (3)	1	Athletic Sonnenberg	2024–25
Italy (2)	3	Brera Calcio	2021–22, 2022–23, 2024–25
Italy (2)	1	Lodigiani	2021–22
Belgium (2)	2	Beveren	2022–23, 2023–24
Belgium (2)	1	K. Berchem Sport	2024–25
Czech Republic (1)	4	Prague Raptors	2021–22, 2022–23, 2023–24, 2024–25
Denmark (1)	3	BK Skjold	2022–23, 2023–24, 2024–25
Netherlands (1)	2	DWS	2021–22, 2022–23
Spain (1)	2	CD Cuenca-Mestallistes	2021–22, 2022–23
Wales (1)	2	Llantwit Major	2023–24, 2024–25
Norway (1)	2	Gamle Oslo FK	2023–24, 2024–25
Romania (1)	2	Venus București	2023–24, 2024–25
Finland (1)	2	Gilla	2023–24, 2024–25
Serbia (1)	2	FK Miljakovac	2022–23, 2024–25
France (1)	1	Vinsky	2023–24
Montenegro (1)	1	Fans United FC	2024–25
Scotland (1)	1	Caledonian Braves	2024–25

== See also ==
- UEFA Regions' Cup
