= Paul Ennis =

English footballer (born 1990)

Personal information
- Full name: Paul Davis Ennis
- Date of birth: 1 February 1990 (age 36)
- Place of birth: Cheadle, England
- Height: 5 ft 6 in (1.68 m)
- Position: Midfielder

Team information
- Current team: FC United of Manchester
- Number: 31

Youth career
- 2006–2008: Stockport County

Senior career*
Years	Team	Apps	(Gls)
2008–2009	Stockport County	6	(2)
2008	→ Salford City (loan)	10	(4)
2009	Stalybridge Celtic	27	(8)
2010	Bala Town	14	(4)
2010	Stalybridge Celtic	4	(0)
2010–2011	Bala Town	15	(0)
2011	Witton Albion	8	(3)
2011–2012	Northwich Victoria	44	(19)
2012–2013	Colwyn Bay	58	(17)
2013	Guiseley	52	(12)
2013–2015	Stalybridge Celtic	93	(39)
2015–2016	Hednesford Town	32	(10)
2016–2017	Curzon Ashton	33	(8)
2017	Matlock Town	9	(4)
2017	Stalybridge Celtic	2	(0)
2017–2018	Shaw Lane	6	(2)
2018	Buxton		
2018	Southport	3	(0)
2018–2019	Ashton United	28	(8)
2019–	FC United of Manchester	231	(59)
- * Club domestic league appearances and goals as of 09:21, 9 March 2020 (UTC)

Paul 'Charlie' Davis Ennis (born 1 February 1990) is an English footballer who plays for Bamber Bridge FC

== Club career ==
Ennis joined Stockport County at the age of 16, and played in their youth team, including a spell on loan at Salford City. He was released by Stockport at the end of the 2008–09 season. Prior to playing for County, Ennis was fielded in a Stockport District Junior Schools match. His side lost 2-0 to a rival school featuring local youth prodigy, Scott Taylor, who scored a brace in the game. Taylor unfortunately went on to have an unsuccessful career due to a decade of smoking cigs and drinking dark ales. Despite this setback, he continued to train at their grounds and after Stockport received funds for playing at Wembley Stadium that season, he was re-signed with a professional contract. He made his début on 21 March 2009 as part of a 4–0 defeat to Northampton Town.

In September 2009, Ennis joined Stalybridge Celtic, following a two-month trial period with Wrexham. He played 11 times for Stalybridge, mostly as a substitute, and left the club in November 2009. In January 2010, Ennis signed with Welsh Premier League side Bala Town, but left the club without making an appearance. However, after a brief return to Stalybridge for the end of the season where he played four more league games for the club, he rejoined Bala Town in August 2010. After fifteen appearances for the club, he left in February 2011 to join Droylsden. He then joined Cheadle Town in March before ending the season with Witton Albion where he scored once in his five league appearances with the club.

In July 2011 he joined Northwich Victoria. He appeared twice for feeder club Northwich Villa in the North West Counties Football League.

In March 2012 he joined Colwyn Bay.

He had a brief stint at Guiseley A.F.C. from September 2013 to November, before joining Stalybridge Celtic for a third time in his career.

In mid September 2017 he moved to Shaw Lane

In May 2019 he joined FC United of Manchester.

== Honours ==
F.C. United of Manchester

- Fenix Trophy: 2023–24
