= Marginson =

Marginson is a surname. Notable people with the surname include:

- Evan Marginson (1909–1977), Australian politician
- Karl Marginson (born 1970), English football manager and player
- Simon Marginson (born 1951), Australian higher education researcher

== See also ==
- Martinson
