= Curtis Jones (footballer, born 1993) =

English footballer (born 1993)

Personal information
- Full name: Curtis Jones
- Date of birth: 27 July 1993 (age 33)
- Place of birth: Manchester, England
- Position: Defender

Team information
- Current team: West Didsbury & Chorlton

Youth career
- –2009: Stockport County
- 2009–2012: Celtic
- 2012–2013: Bristol City

Senior career*
Years	Team	Apps	(Gls)
2013	Livingston	0	(0)
2014	The New Saints		
2016–2017	Nantwich Town	54	(0)
2017–2018	Southport	1	(1)
2018–2019	Ashton United		
2019–2025	F.C. United of Manchester	159	
2025–	West Didsbury & Chorlton	7	(2)
- * Club domestic league appearances and goals as of 10:00, 15 March 2025(UTC)

Curtis Jones (born 27 July 1993) is an English professional footballer who plays as a defender for West Didsbury & Chorlton.

== Club career ==
Jones started his career in the youth academy of Stockport County before moving to Celtic in 2009.

The defender moved to Bristol City in 2012. Following a short spell with the club, he signed a professional contract with Scottish side Livingston in 2013. However, Jones left the club for personal reasons two months later.

In February 2014, Jones signed for Welsh side The New Saints. Jones left the club at the end of the 2013–2014 season.

Jones signed for English side Nantwich Town in 2016. He left the club after just one season.

He signed for Southport in 2017, but left the club after just one season.

The defender was once again on the move, signing for Ashton United in 2018. He moved to F.C. United of Manchester in 2019.

In February 2025, he signed for West Didsbury & Chorlton.
