= Leon Packheiser =

German footballer

Personal information
- Full name: Leon Packheiser
- Date of birth: 16 May 1995 (age 31)
- Place of birth: Germany
- Height: 1.78 m (5 ft 10 in)
- Position: Midfielder

Team information
- Current team: HFC Falke
- Number: 19

Youth career
- –2013: Hamburger SV
- 2013–2014: Rot-Weiß Erfurt

Senior career*
Years	Team	Apps	(Gls)
2014–2015	Rot-Weiß Erfurt	1	(0)
2014–2015	Rot-Weiß Erfurt II	27	(3)
2015–2016	LSK Hansa	30	(2)
2018–	HFC Falke	10	(10)
- * Club domestic league appearances and goals as of 03:10, 27 October 2018 (UTC)

Leon Packheiser (born 16 May 1995) is a German footballer who plays as a midfielder for HFC Falke.

== Career ==
Packheiser made his professional debut for Rot-Weiß Erfurt in the 3. Liga on 15 March 2014, coming on as a substitute in the 87th minute for Marius Strangl in the 4–2 win against VfB Stuttgart II.
