= Kraków Dragoons FC =

Polish association football club

Krakow Dragoons FC
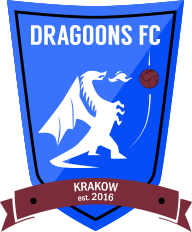
- Full name: Klub Sportowy Dragoons
- Nicknames: The Expats, Smoki (Dragons)
- Founded: 2016; 10 years ago
- Ground: Centrum Sportowo-Rekreacyjne UJ
- Capacity: 330 (seated)
- Owner: Partnership – owned by its members
- Chairman: Gareth Davis
- Manager: Gonçalo Ferreira
- League: Klasa A Kraków I
- 2024–25: Klasa A Kraków I, 5th of 14
- Website: https://www.dragoonsfc.com/
Home colours	Away colours

Krakow Dragoons FC is an association football club based in Kraków, Poland, founded in 2016.

The club was founded by a group of expatriates and began competing in the Polish football league system in the 2019–20 season. The Dragoons played two seasons in Klasa B before being crowned champions of their group at the end of the 2021–22 season, earning promotion to Klasa A. Since the 2022–23 season, they have competed in the Fenix Trophy, a UEFA-sanctioned tournament for non-professional clubs.

With over 20 nationalities represented in the squad, the Dragoons are regarded as the first foreign-founded, multinational football club to compete in the Polish league pyramid.

== History ==
=== Origins (2015–2018) ===
The club's origins trace back to 2015, when casual kickabouts were organised by founder Alex Băcica at the J&J Sports Centre in Kraków. As the group grew in size and ambition, future club president Băcica began coordinating weekly games at Nadwiślan Kraków, near Wawel Castle. The team adopted the name "Dragoons" – a deliberate alternative to "Dragons", which was already in use by a local quidditch side – and designed their first badge and kits to play 11-a-side matches. The name also carries a historical resonance, evoking the Polish cavalry tradition, while the Wawel Dragon remains a central element of the club's badge.

The Dragoons joined the Cracow Sunday Football League (CSFL), where Ashvin Asani served as the team's first head coach. They finished third in their debut CSFL season and began making an annual trip to Warsaw for a six-a-side festival. Inspired by English grassroots side Palmers FC, the club began recording matches and producing video highlights to raise its profile.

After months of negotiations with the Małopolski Związek Piłki Nożnej, the Dragoons officially registered as Klub Sportowy Dragoons Kraków in March 2018, enabling them to enter the Polish football league system the following year. That year the club also hosted the GOAL! Festival, welcoming English side Wanderers FC, and gained international exposure through the Manchester United and DHL partnership initiative.

=== Entry into the Polish league system (2019–2021) ===
In 2019 the Dragoons won the CSFL and became the first foreign-founded multinational club to enter Poland's official football pyramid. On 28 July 2019, they played their first competitive fixture in the Puchar Polski (Polish FA Cup), defeating SF Fairant Kraków 6–0 at Nadwiślan, in the shadow of Wawel Castle. Portuguese midfielder Daniel Silva scored the club's first competitive goal and completed a hat-trick; Adrian Paliś, Ernesto Bumba Jr., and Vitor Pereira were also on the scoresheet. The club then began its Klasa B campaign, narrowly losing its opening league fixture 2–1 to Grębałowianka II Kraków. The club also received special dispensation to field additional non-EU players, reflecting its recognised community role among Kraków's international residents.

The 2019–20 season was curtailed by the COVID-19 pandemic, leaving the Dragoons in fourth place. During this period the City of Kraków nominated the club as Multicultural Ambassadors. The club signed its first commercial sponsorship deal (with Krakow Boat Party) and attended the SD Europe conference as a fan-owned club.

The 2020–21 season, played in part from a modern training facility provided through a partnership with Błonia Sport, again ended in fourth place. However, the Dragoons impressed in the Puchar Polski by reaching the third round and defeating two Klasa A sides.

=== Klasa B title and promotion (2021–2022) ===
The 2021–22 season proved the club's most successful to date. The Dragoons won their Klasa B group championship with 20 wins and 103 goals, culminating in a 15-game winning streak, and earned promotion to Klasa A. Goalkeeper Gabriel Muñoz became the first player to make 50 appearances for the club, keeping 12 clean sheets in the process. The club relocated to the 1,300-capacity ground of KS Prądniczanka and secured new commercial partnerships. It also became one of the few lower-league Polish clubs to live-stream matches after acquiring a VEO camera.

That year the club was invited to represent Poland in the Fenix Trophy, a UEFA-accredited tournament for non-professional clubs chosen for their social, historical, and cultural distinctiveness. A mini-documentary featuring the club was also produced by Mateusz Święcicki.

=== Klasa A and European competition (2022–present) ===
The Dragoons competed in their first Klasa A season in 2022–23, finishing eighth. Their first Fenix Trophy matches in Kraków were staged against Prague Raptors and DWS Amsterdam, with the latter fixture broadcast on Polish National Television (TVP3). Ashvin Asani departed as head coach in May 2023, with Hugo Cruz appointed on an interim basis before taking the role permanently. A subsequent Fenix Trophy campaign paired the club against French YouTube side Vinsky FC and English non-league club FC United of Manchester; the Dragoons attracted over 400 supporters to the home fixture against FC United.

In 2024 the club played before a crowd of 571 at their Fenix Trophy fixture against FC United of Manchester, suffering a 14–0 defeat that set a record for the largest margin of defeat in the competition's history. In the same match, 17-year-old Jan Krzyżanowski made his debut, becoming the youngest player in the club's history. The Dragoons finished sixth in their second Klasa A season. At the club's annual general meeting later that year, long-standing supporter Gareth Davis was elected club president.

In 2025, Gonçalo Ferreira replaced Cruz as head coach. The Dragoons reached the fourth round of the Puchar Polski for the first time, defeating Prokocim before being eliminated by Radziszowianka Radziszów. Captain Enrico Forabosco reached 100 appearances for the club, having scored 48 goals and provided 44 assists since joining in 2020.

== Club identity ==
=== Name ===
The club's name derives from a deliberate play on the word "dragon". As "Kraków Dragons" was already in use by a local quidditch side, the founders chose "Dragoons" – a historical term for a type of mounted soldier, serving as a foreign analogue to Poland's famous hussar cavalry. The Wawel Dragon features prominently on the club badge, connecting the modern name to Kraków's legendary heritage.

=== Community role ===
The Dragoons function as a community club for expatriates and international residents of Kraków. They provide a platform for newcomers to the city to integrate through football, and have been officially recognised by the City of Kraków as Multicultural Ambassadors. The club is structured as a member-owned partnership.

== Current squad ==
As of 24 August 2026

Note: Flags indicate national team as defined under FIFA eligibility rules; some limited exceptions apply. Players may hold more than one non-FIFA nationality.

No.	Pos.	Nation	Player
1	GK	CHI	Gabriel Muñoz-García
2	DF	POL	Szymon Urzędowski
4	DF	COL	Mateo Lopez
5	DF	ITA	Simon Calabrese
6	DF	NED	Brian Lemmen
7	FW	POL	Adrian Paliś
8	MF	ITA	Enrico Forabosco (Captain)
9	FW	ISR	Yuri Samyonov
10	FW	ANG	Flavio Nkola
11	FW	POL	Jeremi Wabiński
13	DF	POL	Jakub Drobny (Vice-captain)
17	MF	ANG	Oscar Nunes
19	DF	POL	Kamil Kącki
20	MF	POR	Daniel Silva (Vice-captain)
21	MF	ESP	Fernando Gámez
22	DF	POL	Gracjan Bałuch
23	MF	ESP	Bernabé Ureba García

No.	Pos.	Nation	Player
25	MF	NED	Rob Smits
26	MF	POL	Jan Krzyżanowski
27	FW	ITA	Giacomo Simonetti
28	FW	ITA	Giordano Zambon
30	FW	CZE	Martin Voženílek
33	MF	ITA	Omar Atzori
34	DF	SCO	Michael Syska-Lamb
38	DF	FRA	Enzo Gambaro
44	FW	POL	Barry Chowaniec
55	FW	ITA	Mirko Barile
73	DF	ESP	Alejandro Pascual
77	DF	POL	Jan Kołodziejski
83	GK	ITA	Lorenzo Bartolomei
88	MF	FRA	Robin Da Silva
91	MF	FRA	Clément De Almeida
93	GK	USA	Jake Hedrick
99	GK	POL	Marcin Obyrtacz

== Honours ==
=== Domestic ===
- Klasa B
  - Winners: 2021–22
