= Tom Greaves =

English footballer (born 1986)

Thomas Greaves is an English football manager and former footballer who managed Thackley and FC United of Manchester.

== Early life ==
Greaves started playing rugby as a child before playing football as a teenager and trialing with English side Bradford City at the age of seventeen.

== Club career ==
Greaves has been described as "one of the most prolific strikers in non-league football" and has scored over 300 goals. He has also been regarded as one of the most recognizable North-West non-league players. He has also been regarded as one of English side Bradford (Park Avenue)'s the most popular and best strikers. He has been the all-time top scorer of English side F.C. United of Manchester.

He started his career with English side Bradford (Park Avenue). In 2013, Greaves signed for English side F.C. United of Manchester. He quickly became regarded as a fan favorite. He spent six seasons with the club. In 2018, he signed for English side Ossett United. In 2020, he signed for English side Bury. In 2022, he signed for English side Thackley, where he was regarded as one of the club's most important strikers.

== International career ==
Greaves has played for the Yorkshire football team.

== Managerial career ==
Greaves started his managerial career with English side F.C. United of Manchester. He was regarded as a promising manager and helped the club escape the relegation zone during his first season. While managing and playing for the club, he also worked for a Yorkshire youth sports coaching company.

In 2022, Greaves was appointed interim player-manager of English side Thackley. He became permanent manager after being regarded to have made an immediate positive impact during his first season as manager and finished as the club's top scorer with 26 goals during the 2022/23 season.
