= FK Miljakovac =

Association football club based in Belgrade, Serbia

- Full name: Fudbalski klub Miljakovac
- Founded: 2020; 6 years ago
- Ground: Stadion FK Rakovica, Belgrade
- Capacity: 1,000
- League: Inter-municipal league Belgrade - group "B"
- 2024–25: Inter-municipal league Belgrade - group "B", 3rd

Fudbalski klub Miljakovac (Serbian: ФК Миљаковац) is an association football club based in Belgrade, Serbia. They compete in the 6th-tier Inter-municipal league Belgrade.

== History ==
FK Miljakovac was founded in 2020. FK Miljakovac was founded by Jovan Simić, a well-known sports and humanitarian worker, who conceived the club's concept and established it. Simić's work gave the club its identity, and under his leadership, it became recognized by the broader public, offering something new to Serbian sports.

=== League history ===
Season	Division	P	W	D	L	F	A	Pts	Pos
2021–22	6 - Inter-municipal league Belgrade - group "A"	26	9	2	15	32	45	29	10th
2022–23	6 - Inter-municipal league Belgrade - group "A"	24	12	2	10	41	46	38	5th
2023–24	6 - Inter-municipal league Belgrade - group "B"	18	8	2	8	35	46	26	5th
2024–25	6 - Inter-municipal league Belgrade - group "B"	20	12	5	3	44	29	41	3rd
