= Matthew Wolfenden (footballer) =

English footballer

Personal information
- Date of birth: 23 July 1987 (age 39)
- Place of birth: Oldham, England
- Positions: Attacking midfielder; striker

Team information
- Current team: Avro

Youth career
- –2003: Oldham Athletic

Senior career*
| Years | Team | Apps | (Gls) |
| 2003–2009 | Oldham Athletic | 48 | (5) |
| 2009–2010 | Wrexham | 17 | (1) |
| 2010–2017 | FC United of Manchester | 305 | (94) |
| 2017–2019 | Stalybridge Celtic | 73 | (21) |
| 2019–2020 | Radcliffe FC | | |
| 2021- | Avro | 4 | (1) |
- * Club domestic league appearances and goals as of 18:50, 22 January 2017 (UTC)

Matthew Wolfenden (born 23 July 1987) is an English footballer who plays as a striker for Northern Premier League Premier Division team Avro. Wolfenden started out at Oldham Athletic, his hometown club, before moving to Wales to play for Wrexham in the summer of 2009. He spent 7 years playing for FC United of Manchester before leaving the club in July 2017.

== Early life ==
As a child, Wolfenden attended his hometown school, the Blue Coat School in Oldham.

== Career ==
=== Oldham Athletic ===
Born in Oldham, Greater Manchester, Wolfenden was a product of the Oldham Athletic youth system, having been with the club since the age of 9, Wolfenden made his first team appearance as a late substitute during a 1–0 defeat to Swindon Town in the then Second Division on 15 November 2003, making him the second youngest player to ever play for the Latics at the age of 16 years and 115 days. His first senior goal for the club came nearly four years later when he scored in the second leg of a play-off semi-final defeat to Blackpool on 19 May 2007. He was released from Boundary Park on 20 July 2009.

=== Wrexham ===
Following his release, Wolfenden signed for Football Conference side Wrexham, after impressing in pre-season friendlies against Preston North End and Carlton Town. He made his debut for the club on 8 August 2009 in a 3–0 win over Eastbourne Borough on the opening day of the 2009–10 season. He went on to make 15 league appearances before being released at the end of the season.

=== FC United of Manchester ===
On 31 October 2010 Wolfenden signed for Northern Premier League Premier Division outfit F.C. United of Manchester after being released from Wrexham earlier that year. He made his debut for FC United in a 2–1 FA Trophy win over Colwyn Bay at Gigg Lane.

Wolfenden was FCUM's top scorer in the 2011–12 and 2012–13 seasons.

After seven years with the club, he left in July 2017.

=== Stalybridge Celtic ===
He joined Stalybridge Celtic in July 2017.

=== Radcliffe FC ===
In July 2019, Wolfenden signed for Radcliffe FC.

=== Avro ===
Wolfenden signed for Northern Premier League Premier Division team Avro in October 2021.
