= Vinsky =

French YouTuber (born 1991)

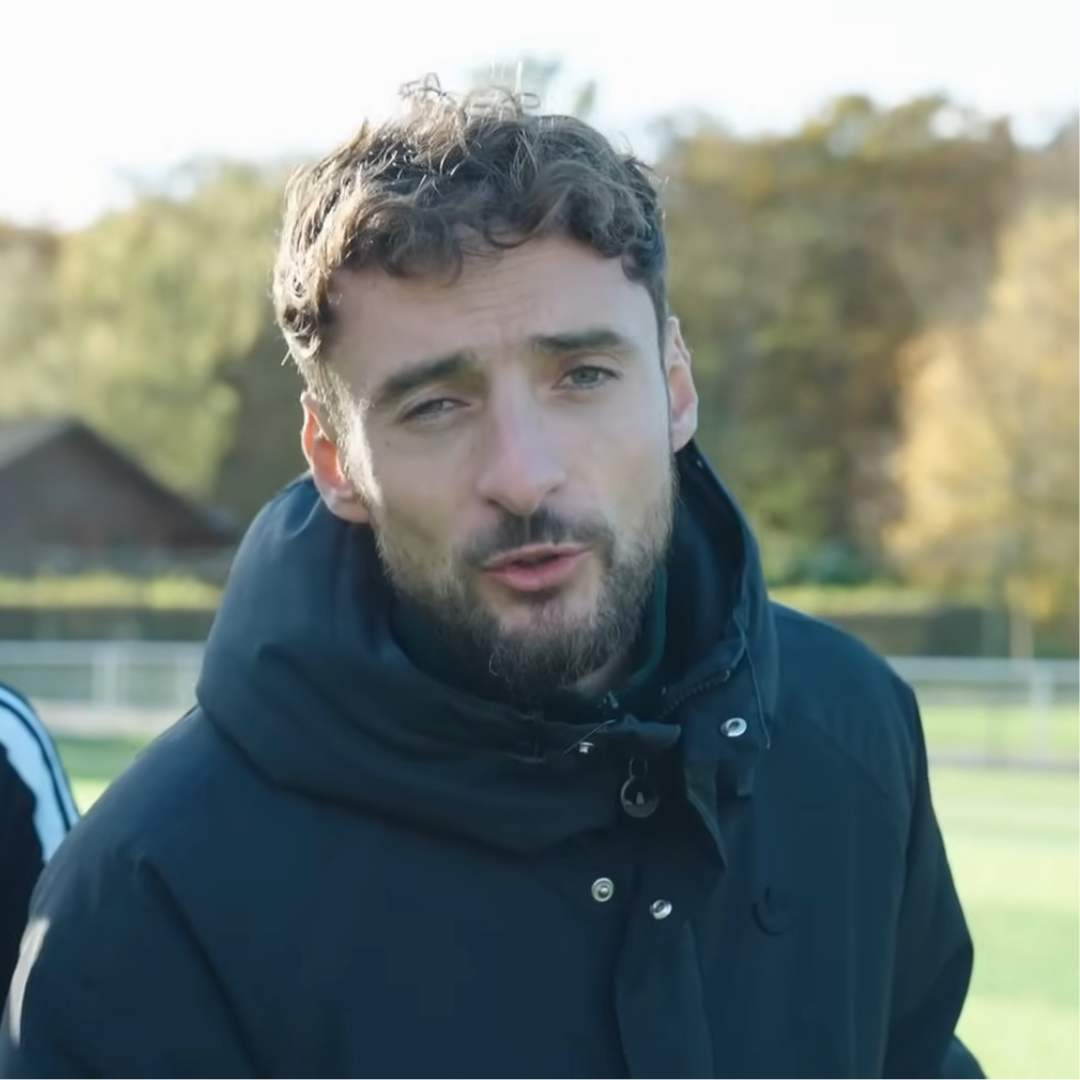
- Born: April 3, 1991 (age 34); Mantes-la-Jolie
- Occupations: YouTuber; Entrepreneur

YouTube information
- Channel: Vinsky
- Years active: 2009–present
- Subscribers: 1.53 million
- Views: 375 million
- Last updated: October 21, 2025

Vincent Maduro (born 4 March 1991), better known as Vinsky, is a French YouTuber and entrepreneur. He is known for his football-related videos, including challenges with famous footballers, as well as for his involvement in the creation and management of Vinsky FC.

== Biography ==
=== YouTube career ===
Vinsky began his YouTube career in 2012, with videos mainly focused on video games, including the FIFA series. His channel, meets with growing success, attracting a wide audience thanks to challenges, soccer analysis and collaborations with famous figures in international soccer. He gained notable popularity with videos in which he challenged soccer stars such as Cristiano Ronaldo, Kylian Mbappé, and Didier Drogba.

=== Soccer career ===
==== Vinsky FC ====
In 2017, Vinsky took things a step further by founding his own soccer club, Vinsky FC, based in the Yvelines region of France, a team that initially competed in Départemental 6 and currently plays in D3. The project aims to entertain subscribers while offering a more personal vision of the sport. Vinsky FC matches are streamed live on Twitch, enabling fans to follow the club's progress. The club quickly attracted attention due to the popularity of its creator and its unique model blending soccer and digital content.

==== Creation of a Football Academy ====
In 2021, Vinsky took the next step in its development by creating a soccer academy. This academy, located in Magnanville, aims to train young players by combining sports, academic and cultural education. In addition to training sessions, the academy offers homework help sessions, cultural outings and awareness-raising on the use of social networks. The aim is to prepare youngsters for a career in soccer, while offering them a comprehensive education.

==== Takeover of pro club SC Escaldes ====
Building on its success with Vinsky FC, Vinsky has expressed its ambition to acquire a professional soccer club in Europe. He is looking for clubs in less publicized but competitive leagues, with the idea of revitalizing these clubs by investing in infrastructure and teams, in the hope of taking part in European competitions such as the Champions League, Europa League or Conference League.

On 20 February 2025, he announced in a YouTube video that he was taking over professional club Sporting Club Escaldes in the Segona Divisió.
