= Karl Marginson =

Footballer and manager (born 1970)

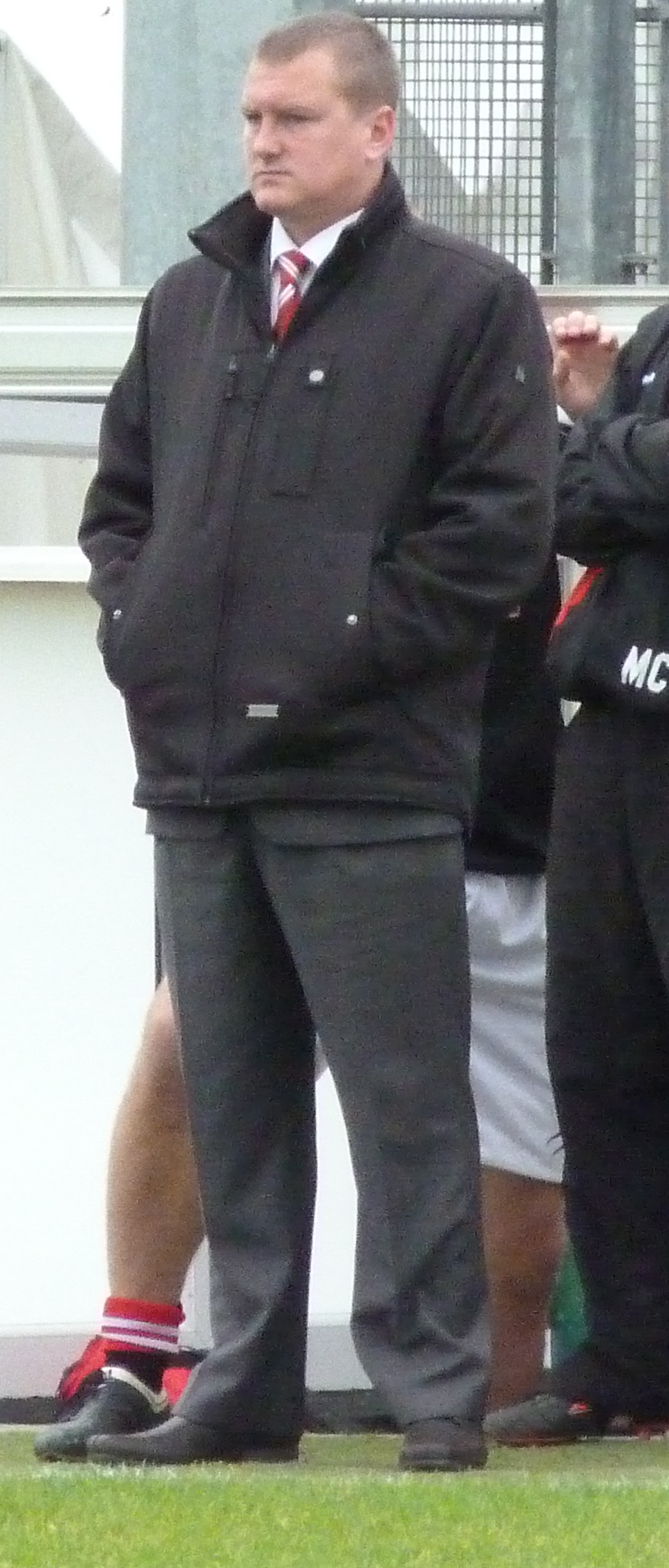
- Marginson in 2011

Personal information
- Full name: Karl Kevin Marginson
- Date of birth: 11 November 1970 (age 55)
- Place of birth: Manchester, England
- Position: Midfielder

Youth career
- Stockport County

Senior career*
Years	Team	Apps	(Gls)
- Blackpool
- Curzon Ashton
- Droylsden
1990–1993	Ashton United	146	(62)
1993–1995	Rotherham United	15	(1)
1995	→ Macclesfield Town (loan)	7	(1)
1995	Macclesfield Town	14	(1)
1995–1997	Chorley		
1996	→ Ashton United (loan)	6	(3)
1997–1999	Barrow		
1999–2000	Stalybridge Celtic	34	(13)
2000	Hyde United	13	(1)
- Salford City
2003–2004	Radcliffe Borough	52	(5)
2004–2005	Flixton		
2007	F.C. United of Manchester	1	(0)

Managerial career
- 2005–2017: F.C. United of Manchester
- 2023–2025: Trafford FC
- * Club domestic league appearances and goals

Karl Kevin Marginson (born 11 November 1970) is an English football manager and former player, who played in the Football League for Rotherham United. He was most recently the manager of Trafford Football Club. He became FC United of Manchester's first manager on 22 June 2005, guiding them to four promotions to reach the National League North before leaving by mutual agreement on 24 October 2017.

== Playing career ==
As a player, Marginson played for the Football League clubs Blackpool, Rotherham United and Macclesfield Town. He also has extensive experience of non-league football in the north-west of England having played for Salford City, Radcliffe Borough, Hyde United, Stalybridge Celtic, Barrow, Chorley, Droylsden and Curzon Ashton. He spent the 2004–05 season playing in the North West Counties Football League with First Division Bacup Borough.

In terms of silverware, his most successful period was from 1996 to 1998. In 1995–96, he won the FA Trophy at Wembley with Macclesfield Town. The following year, again with Macclesfield, he went on to win the Conference title and promotion to the football league. In 1997–98, he won the Northern Premier with Barrow AFC, scoring the title clinching goal against nearest rivals Boston Utd.

== Management career ==
On 22 June 2005, he was appointed as the first ever manager of FC United of Manchester after one of their players, Joz Mitten, recommended him to the board and led the team to immediate success by achieving promotion in each of their first three seasons. During his tenure the club reached the National League North, the sixth tier of English football, after gaining promotion in the 2014–15 season by winning the Northern Premier League Premier Division title. In the 2010–11 season, Marginson led them into the FA Cup proper for the first time, where they upset Rochdale to reach the second round. Marginson is regularly celebrated by fans of the club at matches, home and away, due to these achievements. For the first five seasons, he led the club on a semi-professional basis but later gave up his fruit and vegetable delivery business to work full-time for FC United, a role which included involvement in the club's community work such as coaching youngsters and other groups. On 24 October 2017, Marginson left his post as manager at F.C. United by mutual agreement.

In November 2018, he was appointed Head of Football Operations at Radcliffe F.C.

In October 2023, he was appointed manager of Trafford Football Club.

== Managerial statistics ==
As of match played 30 September 2017

Team	From	To	Record				
Team	From	To	G	W	D	L	Win %
F.C. United of Manchester	June 2005	Oct 2017	456	220	98	138	48.25

- statistics source from www.soccerbase.com
