= F.C. United of Manchester =

Association football club in Greater Manchester, England

Coordinates: 53°31′0″N 2°10′49″W

- Full name: Football Club United of Manchester
- Nicknames: F.C. United; The Reds; Red Rebels
- Founded: 2005; 21 years ago
- Ground: Broadhurst Park
- Capacity: 4,900
- Chairman: Nick Boom
- Manager: Mark Beesley
- League: Northern Premier League Premier Division
- 2025–26: Northern Premier League Premier Division, 3rd of 21
- Website: www.fc-utd.co.uk
Home colours	Away colours	Third colours

Football Club United of Manchester, more commonly known as FC United, is a professional football club based in Moston, Manchester, England, that competes in the Northern Premier League, the seventh tier of the English football league system, and plays home matches at Broadhurst Park.

Founded in 2005 by Manchester United supporters opposed to American businessman Malcolm Glazer's takeover, F.C. United entered Division Two of the North West Counties Football League, earned three consecutive promotions and were promoted for a fourth time to National League North for the 2015–16 season. In cup competitions, F.C. United reached the second round of the FA Cup in 2010–11 and the fourth round of the FA Trophy in 2014–15. In 2019, they were relegated back to the Northern Premier League.

After ground-sharing between 2005 and 2014 with Bury at Gigg Lane, F.C. United opened their own ground, Broadhurst Park in north-east Manchester, in May 2015. The team was managed by Karl Marginson from its formation in 2005 until October 2017. The club's regular kit colours are red shirts, white shorts and black socks. Their badge is based on the Manchester coat of arms and features a ship at sea and a shield bearing Gules, three bendlets enhanced or, taken from the heraldic shield of Robert de Gresle, the first lord of the manor of Manchester (1174–1230) whose statue adorns the townhall in Albert square.

After Exeter City, United is the second largest fan-owned football club in the United Kingdom by number of members, and has one of the highest home attendances in English non-league football. The club is democratically run by its members who have equal voting rights and own one share each in the club.

== History ==
=== Formation ===
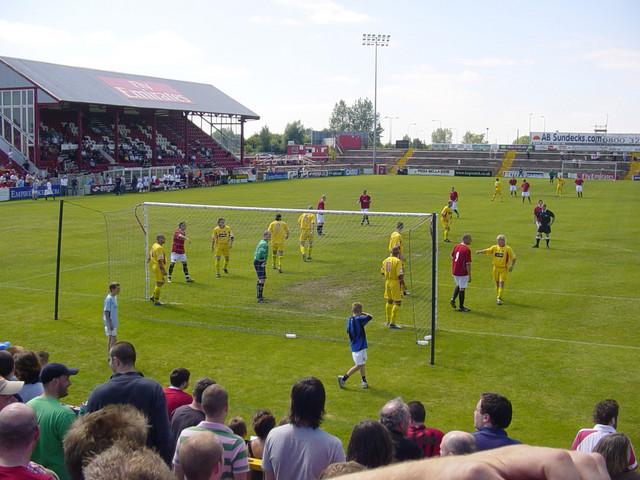
F.C. United's first game was a friendly against Leigh RMI in 2005.

The club was founded in 2005 by disaffected supporters of Manchester United. Although there were varying reasons for their dissatisfaction, the catalyst for F.C. United's formation was the 12 May 2005 takeover of Manchester United by American businessman Malcolm Glazer. Supporters first considered forming a breakaway club in 1998 during an attempted takeover of Manchester United by BSkyB. The creation of F.C. United in the event of a Glazer buyout was first proposed in February 2005 by Manchester United fanzine Red Issue.

Public meetings for fans were held on 19 May 2005 at the Central Methodist Hall in Manchester's Northern Quarter and on 30 May at the Apollo Theatre. Subsequently, a steering group was created to set up the new club. After the name "F.C. United" was rejected by The Football Association for being too generic, those who had pledged money to the club were asked to vote on a name. On 14 June 2005, it was announced that "F.C. United of Manchester" had been chosen, beating "A.F.C. Manchester 1878", "Manchester Central", and "Newton Heath United", and F.C. United were officially registered with the Manchester County Football Association on the same day.

Karl Marginson was appointed as the club's manager on 22 June, and the club held trials for players four days later. Around 900 players applied to take part in the trials, of whom 200 were chosen to take part and 17 selected to play for F.C. United. Jonathan Mitten, great-nephew of Manchester United forward Charlie Mitten, was the club's first signing.

F.C. United's inaugural members' meeting was held on 5 July 2005 at the Methodist Central Hall. Members voted on the club's constitution, badge, and core principles and elected the 11-member board. By 6 July, over 4,000 people had pledged money to F.C. United and the club had over £100,000 in the bank. During F.C. United's formation, the owners of Leigh RMI offered to merge the two clubs, but the parties decided against the idea. F.C. United later arranged to play their first ever game against Leigh RMI on 16 July 2005; the match ended 0–0.

=== North West Counties years (2005–07) ===
For the 2005–06 season, F.C. United played in the Second Division of the North West Counties Football League (NWCFL), which is level ten of the English football league system and nine levels below the Premier League. The club played its home matches at Bury's Gigg Lane. F.C. United were ineligible to play in the FA Vase for their first season because the club was formed after the deadline to enter the competition. They were, however, able to play in the North West Counties League Challenge Cup.

F.C. United's first competitive match was a 5–2 away victory against Leek County School Old Boys on 13 August 2005. 2,590 people attended the game. In its home debut on 20 August, the club defeated Padiham 3–2 with two goals from Rory Patterson. During their first season, F.C. United consistently broke NWCFL attendance records. A crowd of 6,032 watched the team during their final home league match of the season against Great Harwood Town, which remains an NWCFL record as of 2016. Despite losing that game 0–1, the team were promoted to Division One.

F.C. United's successful 2006/07 season in Division One of the NWCFL earned the club a promotion to Division One North of the Northern Premier League. They secured their second successive league title with a 7–1 win over Atherton Laburnum Rovers on 18 April 2007. They then won their second cup of the season by beating Curzon Ashton 2–1 in the NWCFL's Challenge Cup final. In the third round of the FA Vase competition, the club was eliminated when it lost 2–3 in the last minute of extra-time to Quorn.

=== Northern Premier League years (2007–15) ===
In 2007–08, F.C. United played in the inaugural season of the Northern Premier League (NPL) Division One North. They made their debut in the FA Cup that season, but lost 1–2 to Fleetwood Town in the first qualifying round. They advanced to the final of the 2007–08 NPL President's Cup, in which they beat Radcliffe Borough 2–0 to pick up their fourth trophy in the three years following the club's formation. The club finished the season second in the league, trailing champions Bradford Park Avenue by one point, and entered the play-offs for the other promotion place. After beating Bamber Bridge 3–2 in the semi-finals, F.C. United faced Skelmersdale United in the promotion play-off final, coming back from a goal down to win 4–1 and earn their third successive promotion to play in the Northern Premier League Premier Division.

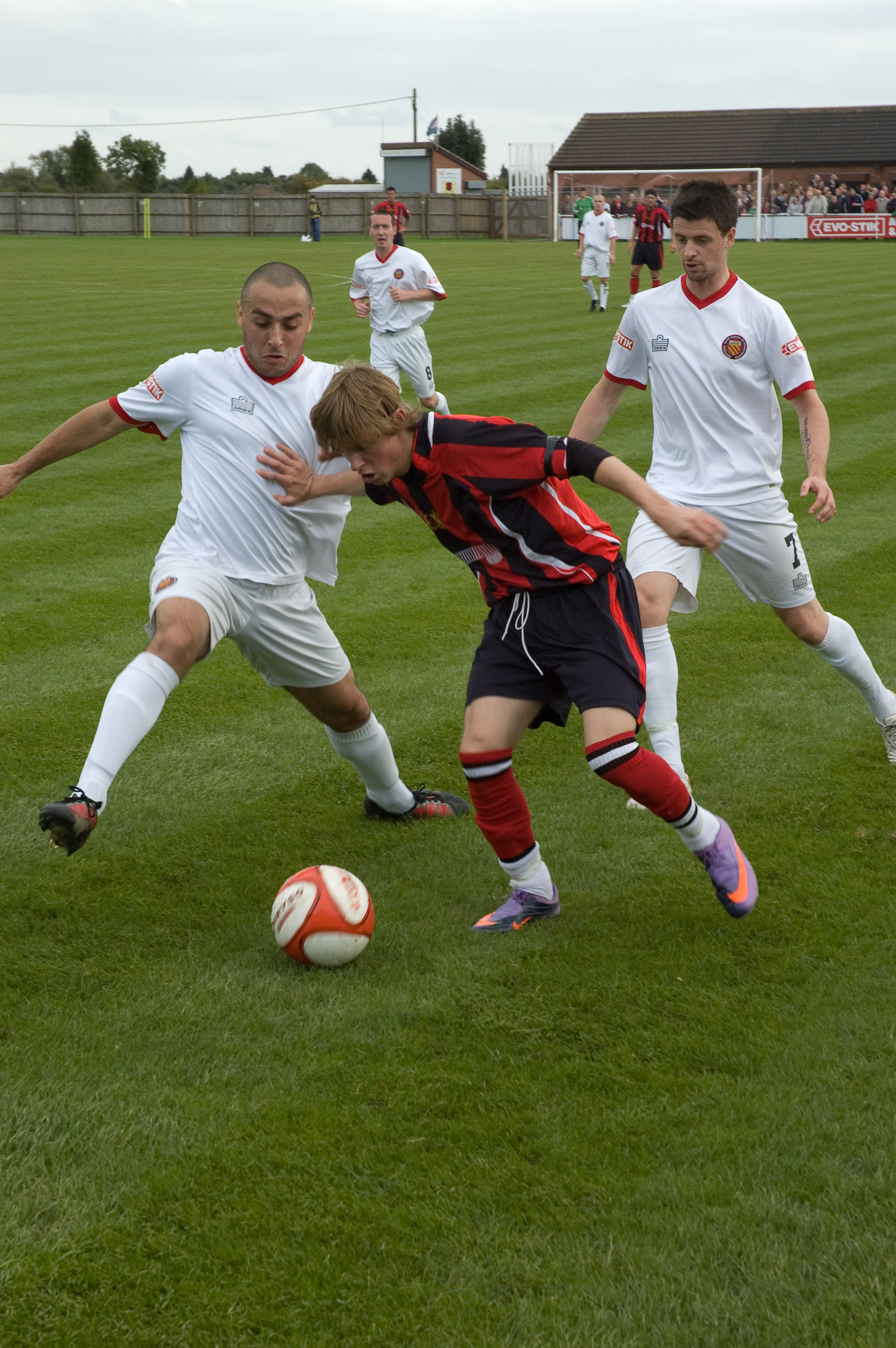
F.C. United (in white) playing away against Mickleover Sports, October 2010

In 2008–09, F.C. United made their debut in the FA Trophy, reaching the third qualifying round, and missed out on a play-off place on the last day of the regular season. In the 2009–10 season, they finished 13th in the league, their lowest league position in the first five seasons, before progressing to the play-offs in 2010–11. They beat Bradford Park Avenue 2–0 in the semi-finals but lost the final 0–1 to Colwyn Bay. Earlier that season, F.C. United reached the first round of the FA Cup for the first time, recording victories over Radcliffe Borough, Gainsborough Trinity, Norton & Stockton Ancients and Barrow to play League One side Rochdale. They defeated Rochdale 3–2 after a late winner from Mike Norton, and played eventual 2010–11 League One champions Brighton & Hove Albion in the second round. After a 1–1 away draw at Withdean Stadium, F.C. United lost the replay at Gigg Lane 0–4, in front of their highest home attendance of 6,731.

In the 2011–12 season, F.C. United reached the first round of the FA Trophy for the first time after knocking out Frickley Athletic, Durham City and Altrincham. In the league, they qualified for the end of season play-offs, despite finishing 6th, due to the demotion of Northwich Victoria for breaching of financial rules. They beat Chorley 2–0 in the play-off semi-final to qualify for consecutive play-off finals but lost 0–1 to Bradford Park Avenue in the penultimate minute of extra time.

F.C. United finished third in the 2012–13 season to book a place in the play-offs. They won 3–1 against Witton Albion in the semi-final, but lost the final for the third consecutive time with a 1–2 defeat to Hednesford Town. The following season, the club finished second in the league but lost in the play-offs in the semi-finals. During the 2014–15 campaign, F.C. United reached the fourth round of the FA Trophy and recorded a streak of 21 league games without a loss from December to April, including 16 victories. They secured their promotion to the National League North following a 1–0 win against Stourbridge on 21 April 2015; after seven years of trying. The club's top scorer for this championship winning season was Tom Greaves, the same player who scored the winning goal for Bradford Park Avenue against F.C. United in the 2012 play-off final.

=== National League years (2015–19) ===
F.C. United recorded their first victory in the National League North in a 3–2 home win over Brackley Town on 22 August 2015, which was the club's first competitive win at Broadhurst Park. In October, for the second time in the club's history, they secured a place in the first round of the FA Cup with a 3–1 away win over Sporting Khalsa, but were eliminated from the competition after a 4–1 home loss against Chesterfield. In November, the club ended their cup runs for the 2015–16 season after two successive home defeats to Stalybridge Celtic 3–4 in the Manchester Premier Cup and to Telford United 1–2 in the FA Trophy. Between September and November 2015, F.C. United lost seven consecutive league matches; their worst run ever as of April 2017. They eventually finished the season in 13th place.

The following 2016–17 season, the team again finished 13th and won the Manchester FA county cup for the first time in their history, beating Stalybridge Celtic 1–0 in the final. After a poor start to the 2017–18 season, Karl Marginson, the team's first and only manager, left the club by mutual consent in October 2017. He was replaced by forward Tom Greaves who took over on a temporary basis and was appointed permanent player-manager the next month. F.C. United finished the season in 16th place and retained the Manchester FA county cup with a penalty shoot-out victory against Trafford F.C. Greaves, who became the club's all-time record goal-scorer in December 2017, saw his contract extended until the end of the 2018–19 season.

After a poor start to the 2018–19 season, Greaves left the club at the end of August 2018, with long-serving former player David Chadwick acting as interim manager. In late October, the club appointed Neil Reynolds as first team manager. On 22 April 2019, Easter Monday, FC United were relegated back to the Northern Premier League following a 1–2 home defeat to Blyth Spartans.

=== Return to Northern Premier League (2019–present) ===
After suffering relegation from the National League North at the end of the 2018/19 season, FC United of Manchester returned to the Northern Premier League for the 2019/20 campaign. Under manager Neil Reynolds, the club enjoyed an excellent start to life back in the division, finishing second before the season was abandoned due to the COVID-19 pandemic. The following seasons brought mixed fortunes, with FC United finishing 9th in 2021/22, 8th in 2022/23, 14th in 2023/24 and 17th in 2024/25. However, the 2025/26 campaign marked a significant improvement, as the Reds finished 3rd with 72 points, reaching the play-offs but ultimately missing out on promotion after losing 3–2 to Warrington Rylands. As they continue into the 2026/27 season, FC United will be hoping to build on that progress, challenge for promotion and eventually return to the National League North.

== Colours and badge ==
F.C. United of Manchester's badge is based on the coat of arms of Manchester City Council.

F.C. United's club colours are red, white and black – the same colours worn by Manchester United. The shirt originally beared no sponsorship logo, as it was written into the club's constitution that the club should not have a shirt sponsor. The club would later go back on this however, with the introduction of a Street Cartel sleeve sponsor for the 2026/27 season. The club's first kit was a plain red shirt, white shorts and plain black socks. The club introduced a new home shirt for the 2007–08 season with a striped collar and striped ends on the sleeves which lasted until 2009. This was changed for the 2009–11 seasons to a red shirt with a black and white stripe down the left side, manufactured by Admiral Sportswear. For seasons 2011–13 the club reverted to a plain red shirt, manufactured by O'Neills. At the start of the 2018–19 season, Errea replaced O'Neill's as kit supplier.

The club's second kit, worn when playing away against a team with a predominantly red kit, is a white shirt, white shorts and socks. The club has an alternative plain blue kit with the clenched fist logo and the words "Our Club Our Rules" on the shirt front for playing against a team with a red and white kit. In past seasons white shirts with diagonal black or red stripes and a white shirt with a red trim, black shorts and white socks have all been used as the second kits.

The club's badge is red, white, black and yellow, and incorporates elements from the coat of arms of Manchester City Council; a ship representing Manchester's industry the shield is taken from the Heraldic crest of Robert de Gresle, the first baron of Manchester, and features three bendlets enhanced gules. Robert de Gresle's statue adorns the townhall in Albert square.

== Stadium ==
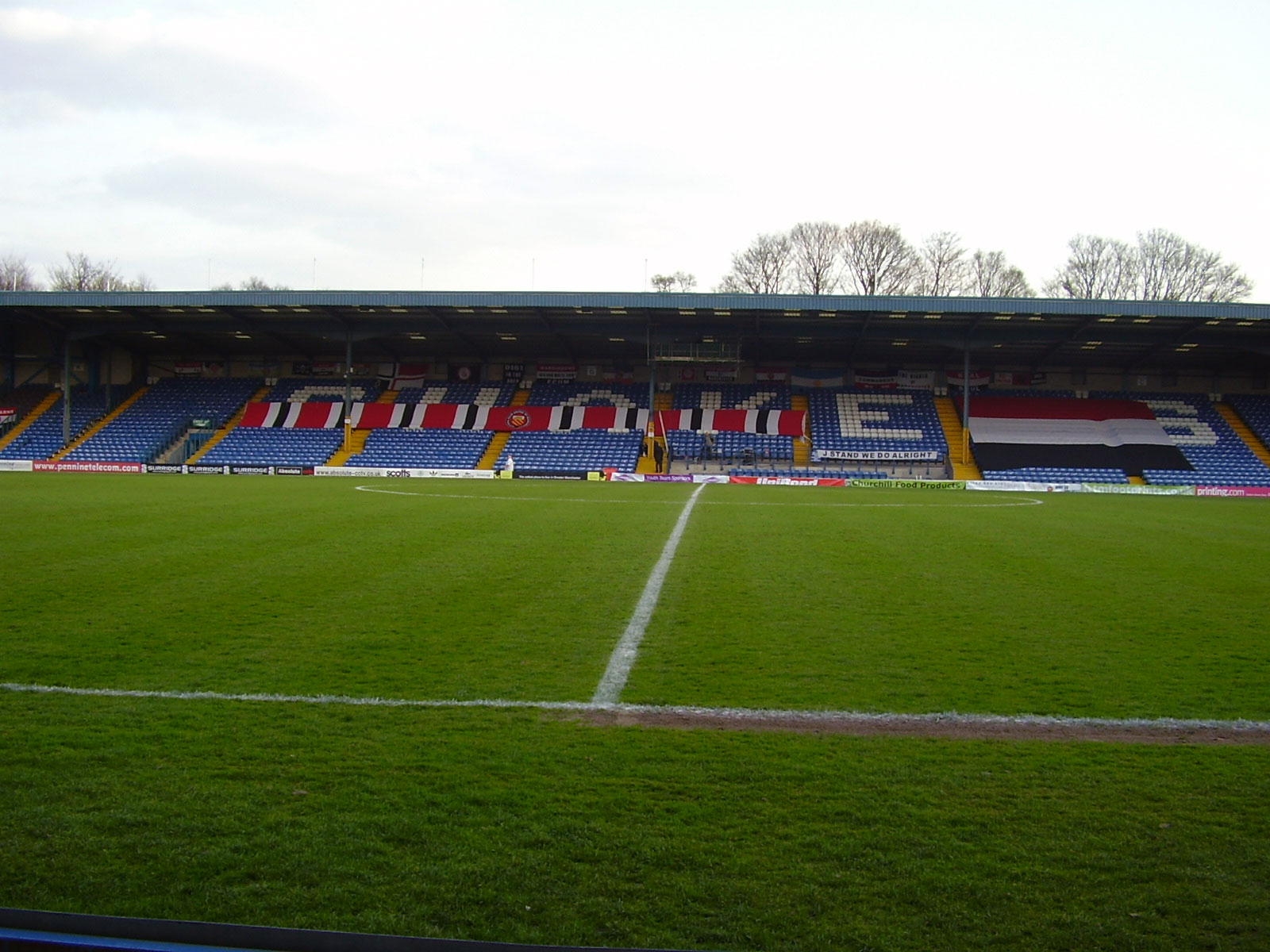
Gigg Lane decorated with the club's flags and banners. This was the club's home in its formative years.

F.C. United play at the 4,900 capacity Broadhurst Park, which opened in May 2015. The ground was built at a cost of £6.3 million, using £2 million from a Community Share Scheme and the remainder from a variety of governmental and charity grants. The ground is surrounded on all sides by covered stands: the St. Mary's Road End (east), the North Stand, the Lightbowne Road End (west) and the Main Stand (south), the latter of which has seating sections. Within the Main Stand is a clubhouse with a bar and catering facilities, club offices, changing rooms, a medical suite and a classroom. The stadium is shared with a local junior team, Moston Juniors F.C.

From their foundation in 2005 until 2014, F.C. United were based at Bury F.C.'s Gigg Lane stadium. F.C. United's first proposed stadium was announced in 2010 for Newton Heath, the original home of Manchester United. The development was planned to be located on the site of the Ten Acres Lane sports centre and would have cost £3.5 million, to be financed by public donations, a Community Shares issue and grant funding. However a year later, in March 2011, Manchester City Council backed out from funding the stadium. The Broadhurst Park site in Moston, north-east Manchester, was announced in April 2011. Detailed information about the new facility was released in June 2011 and Manchester City Council approved the planning permission for the site on 27 October 2011. F.C. United had to overcome some obstacles including funding agreements, contractor and lease negotiations and a legal challenge from local residents which caused a further two-year delay before building commenced in November 2013.

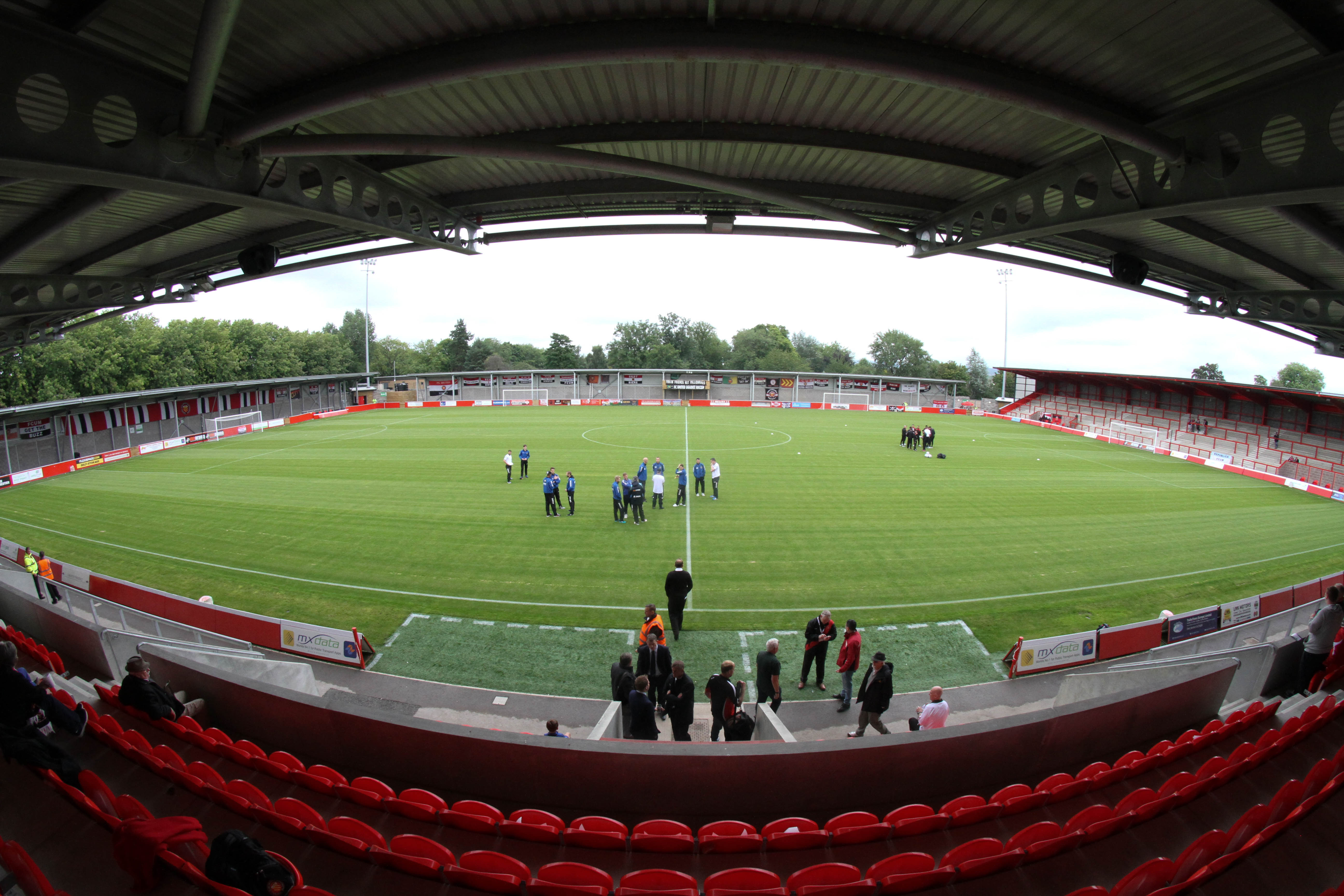
The club's home ground, Broadhurst Park, opened in May 2015.

During their time at Bury, fixture clashes meant that F.C. United used a further six stadia for home fixtures: Altrincham's Moss Lane; Radcliffe Borough's Stainton Park; Hyde United's Ewen Fields; Stalybridge Celtic's Bower Fold; Curzon Ashton's Tameside Stadium; and Flixton's Valley Road.

For the 2014–15 season, F.C. United ended their groundsharing agreement with Bury after nine seasons in preparation for their move to Broadhurst Park. As the ground was not ready at the start of the season, they used Bower Fold as a temporary home. Delays with Broadhurst Park meant that F.C. United were unable to move in until May 2015, and following fixture clashes with Stalybridge Celtic the club moved in December 2014 to the Tameside Stadium for the remainder of the season. F.C. United hosted a test event at Broadhurst Park on 16 May 2015, staging a short match between their first team and an Invitational XI made up of past players. The official opening game was a friendly against Benfica B on 29 May, the anniversary of Manchester United's victory over Benfica in the 1968 European Cup Final. Benfica won the opening game 1–0 in front of a crowd of 4,232.

== Supporters ==
F.C. United are owned by nearly 2000 of their members and are the third largest supporter-owned football club in the United Kingdom by number of members. Each member can vote on how the club is run, including voting for board members, kit designs, and season ticket prices. F.C. United fans are known for the large range of songs that they sing at matches, and the atmosphere created by fans has been praised in the media.

During their first season (2005–06), F.C. United had the second-highest average attendance in English non-League football with an average gate of 3,059 and were the 87th best supported club across all divisions. Attendances fell in the next two seasons and they were the 92nd best supported club in 2006–07 and 100th best supported club by 2007–08. Their average league attendance then levelled out at approximately 2,000 per game, before rising to an average of 2,155 in 2014–15, the then-seventh highest attendance in non-League football. After moving to Broadhurst Park in May 2015, the club averaged a gate of 3,394 in 2015–16, a season-on-season increase of over 57% and the fourth highest attendance in non-League football.

== Organisation ==
F.C. United operate as a community benefit society. Membership is obtained by paying an annual fee of £25 to the club (£5 for children) but each member receives only one share in the club and is entitled to a single vote at meetings, regardless of the amount donated. The board consists of up to 11 members who are elected by the members of the club. Day-to-day operations of the club are overseen by a chief executive officer; Andy Walsh, a founding member of F.C. United, was appointed to the position in 2005. He stepped down from the role at the end of June 2016. Damian Chadwick, another founding member of the club, took up the position in November 2016. Chadwick stood down in 2018 and was replaced by Paul Smith. In 2023 Danny Davis was hired as General Manager.

The club's manifesto includes the following core principles:

1. The Board will be democratically elected by its members;
2. Decisions taken by the membership will be decided on a one-member, one vote basis;
3. The club will develop strong links with the local community and strive to be accessible to all, discriminating against none;
4. The club will endeavour to make admission prices as affordable as possible, to as wide a constituency as possible;
5. The club will encourage young, local participation—playing and supporting—whenever possible;
6. The Board will strive wherever possible to avoid outright commercialism;
7. The club will remain a non-profit organisation.

The club accepts sponsorship but does not allow sponsors' logos to be displayed on the team's shirts. The club's main sponsor in its inaugural 2005–06 season was the Bhopal Medical Appeal and in the 2006–07 season it was the Williams BMW Group. Between 2011 and 2016, F.C. United were sponsored by mxData, a Manchester-based mobile app development company. In October 2014, F.C. United became the first football club in the United Kingdom to be accredited as a living wage employer by the Living Wage Foundation.

== Criticism ==
F.C. United and their founders have been criticised and supported by fans of Manchester United and the media; some fans view those who chose to leave to follow F.C. United as "traitors". Manchester United manager Sir Alex Ferguson questioned the loyalty of fans who decided to form the club and the motivation behind the forming of F.C. United in a 2006 book:

I'm sorry about that. It is a bit sad, that part, but I wonder just how big a United supporter they are. They seem to me to be promoting or projecting themselves a wee bit rather than saying, "at the end of the day the club have made a decision, we'll stick by them." It's more about them than us.

— Sir Alex Ferguson, The Official Manchester United Diary of the Season (2006)

Former Manchester United forward Eric Cantona has supported the club, describing them as "having a great idea" and expressing hope that F.C. United will "become a great club and win the European Cup in 50 years' time". In 2010, aged 43, he said that he would be prepared to play for the club. Steve Coppell, Manchester United winger between 1975 and 1983, joined the club as a co-owner in April 2016.

F.C. United have been criticised by their own members for abandoning their principles, including agreeing to a photo op with a Conservative Party government minister in October 2015, despite a club policy not to be used for political promotion, and a day after some club members took part in a march against government cuts in Manchester. F.C. United defended the visit as "an essential part" of the development of financial vehicles for football fans, arguing that it will help government representatives to better understand the benefits and challenges of social investment.

The club's programme editor resigned from his position in June 2015 over a one-off price rise of the programme for Broadhurst Park's opening game against Benfica the previous month; a Board decision that was described as breaching the club's founding principle of avoiding outright commercialism. F.C. United were also criticised at the time for a deficit in democracy, transparency and accountability between their officials and the membership.

In 2016, protests by supporters led to several board members stepping down and an Emergency General Meeting (EGM) to elect a new board was subsequently called. The protests culminated in several fans invading the pitch during the last home game of the 2015–16 season, calling for the remaining board members deemed responsible for the lack of democracy and transparency at the club to resign. Three board members resigned within a week of the on-pitch protest, along with the club's Press and Communications Officer. On 5 June, the EGM took place and a new board of 11 members were elected, leading to "a sense of progression and an air of optimism" among the club's members.

== Statistics and records ==
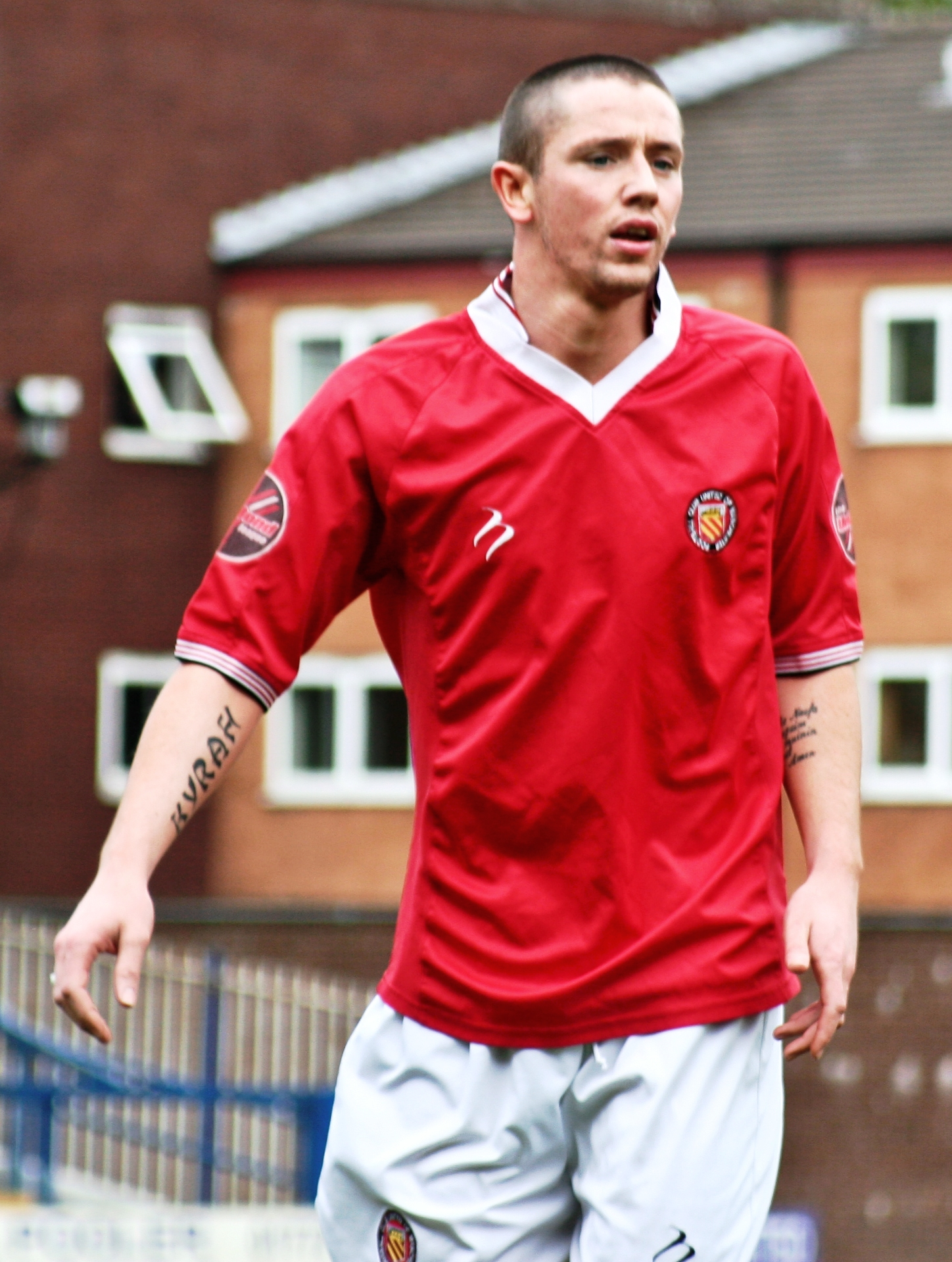
Rory Patterson scored 99 goals for F.C. United in all competitions. He later represented Northern Ireland.

The record for the most appearances for F.C. United is held by Jerome Wright, with 400 as of March 2018. Tom Greaves is the club's all-time record goal-scorer with 102 goals in all competitions, which includes 86 in the league and 16 in cup matches as of January 2018. Six other players, Rory Patterson, Mike Norton, Matthew Wolfenden, Jerome Wright, Simon Carden and Stuart Rudd have also scored more than 50 goals for the club. Rudd holds the record for most goals scored in a single season, having scored 45 goals in the 2006–07 season.

The largest number of points the team accrued is 112 in the 2006–07 season, and the highest number of goals scored in a season is 157, achieved in 42 matches in 2006–07. The club's best performance in the FA Cup was a second round appearance during the 2010–11 season. After a 3–2 first round win over Rochdale, F.C. United recorded a 1–1 away draw with Brighton & Hove Albion, forcing a home replay which they lost 0–4. The team has since advanced to the first round of the FA Cup twice, losing 1–4 in 2015–16 to Chesterfield and 1–5 in 2020–21 to Doncaster Rovers.

In the 2006–07 season, F.C. United reached the third round of the FA Vase, beating Padiham and Salford City in the first two rounds but lost 2–3 at home to Quorn after extra time. In the 2014–15 season, they progressed to the fourth round of the FA Trophy, defeating Harrogate Town, Chorley and AFC Fylde in the first three rounds before losing 0–1 away to Torquay United.

The club's record league victory was a 10–2 win over Castleton Gabriels on 10 December 2005 in the North West Counties Football League Division Two; Simon Carden scored five of the goals, which is the club record for the highest number of goals scored by a player in a single game. F.C. United achieved eight-goal victory margins on three further occasions, in 8–0 wins over Squires Gate, Glossop North End and Nelson, all during the 2006–07 season. The club's heaviest league defeat is 0–6 away to Harrogate Town on 10 March 2018 in the National League North.

F.C. United's highest home attendances are 6,731 against Brighton in the second round of the 2010–11 FA Cup on 8 December 2010 and 6,023 against Great Harwood Town in the North West Counties Football League Division Two on 22 April 2006, both at Gigg Lane.

== Players ==
=== First team squad ===
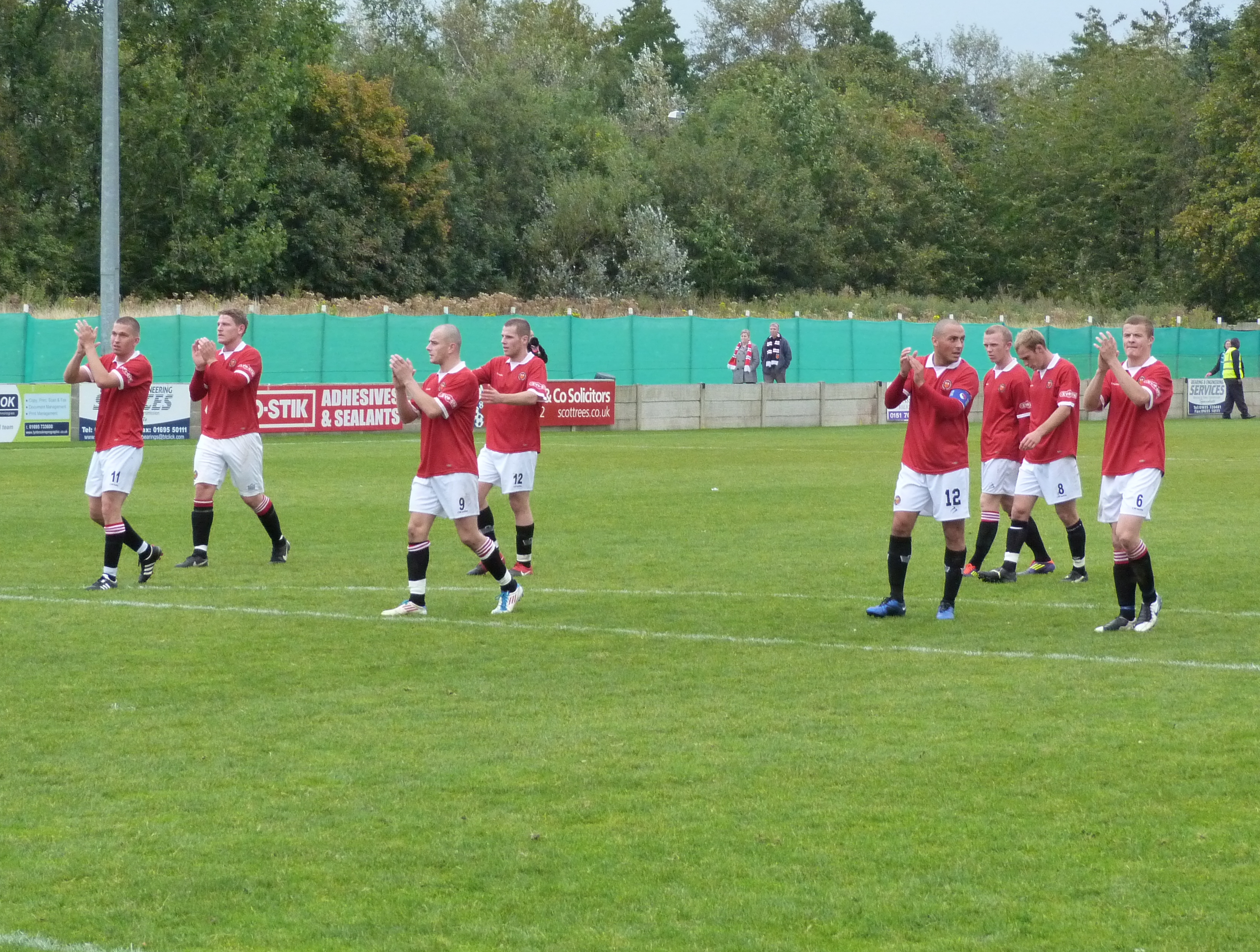
F.C. United players in 2011 thanking fans for their support

As of 18 August 2026

Note: Flags indicate national team as defined under FIFA eligibility rules; some limited exceptions apply. Players may hold more than one non-FIFA nationality.

No.	Pos.	Nation	Player
—	GK	ENG	Dan Atherton
—	DF	ENG	Matty Devine
—	DF	ENG	Declan Evans
—	DF	ENG	Charlie Hayes-Green
—	DF	CZE	Jan Palinkas
—	DF	ENG	Nathan Snowball (on loan from Preston North End)
—	DF	ENG	Matty Thomson
—	MF	ENG	Michael Donohue
—	MF	ENG	Charlie Ennis (captain)
—	MF	ENG	Matthew Fearnley

No.	Pos.	Nation	Player
—	MF	ENG	Ruben Grewal
—	MF	ENG	Matthew Grivosti
—	MF	ENG	Hamed Sidibe
—	MF	ENG	Adam Sudworth
—	MF	ENG	Andre Wisdom
—	FW	ENG	Jordan Buckley
—	FW	ZAM	Donald Chimalilo
—	FW	ENG	Adam Le Fondre
—	FW	ENG	Gerald Sithole
—	FW	ENG	Niall Watson (on loan from Hednesford Town)

==== Out on loan ====
Note: Flags indicate national team as defined under FIFA eligibility rules; some limited exceptions apply. Players may hold more than one non-FIFA nationality.

No.	Pos.	Nation	Player

=== International representation ===
F.C. United have assisted in providing several players for the international football scene; the club's all-time record goal-scorer Rory Patterson went on to play and score for Northern Ireland at senior level and forward Matthew Walwyn debuted for Saint Kitts and Nevis in a friendly against Andorra in November 2015. F.C. United's youth team were represented in the England Schoolboys squad by Scott Cheetham in 2011 and in 2013, the club signed Pakistan international defender Amjad Iqbal from Bradford Park Avenue. Other F.C. United players to have played international football include Stephen O'Halloran (Republic of Ireland), Ludovic Quistin (Guadeloupe), Jason St Juste and Jacob Hazel (both St Kitts and Nevis).

== Coaching staff ==
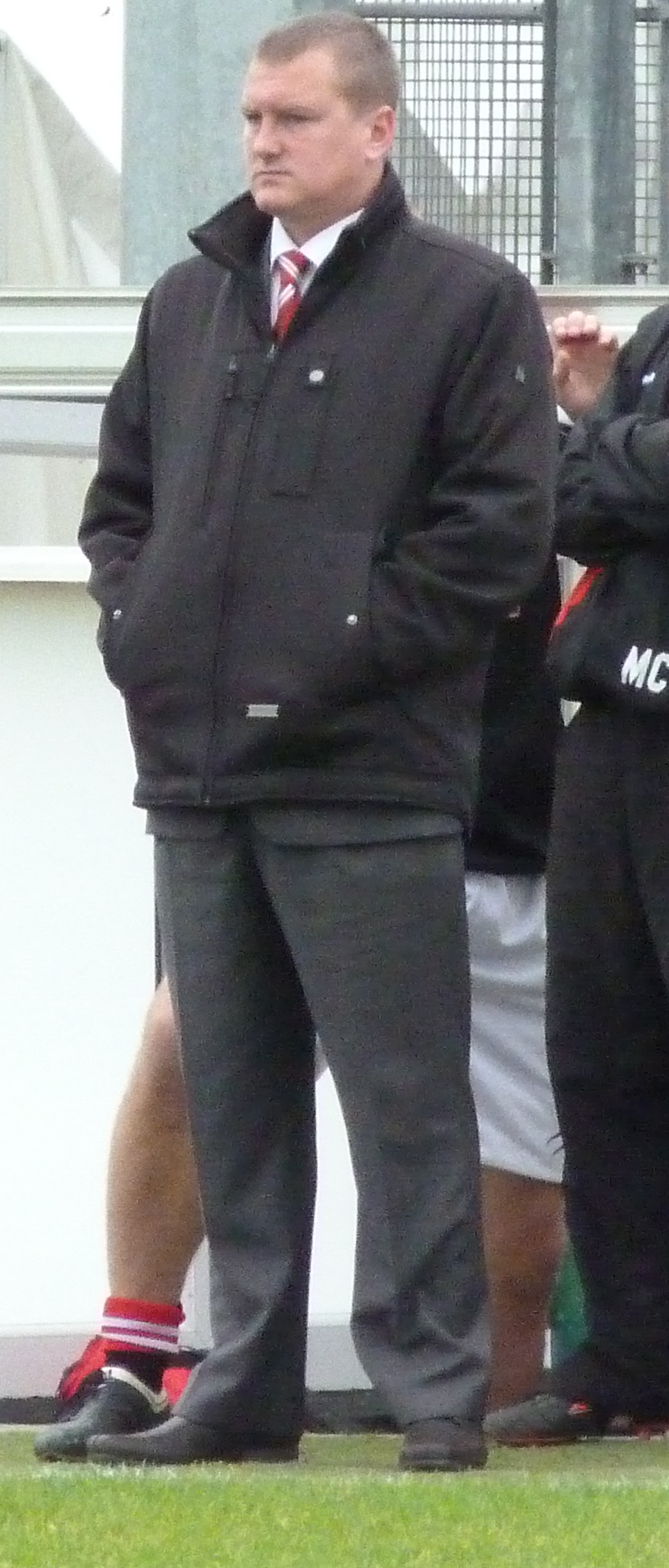
Karl Marginson was the manager of F.C. United for 12 years, from its formation to 2017.

Upon its formation, F.C. United appointed Karl Marginson as its manager. He led the team to four promotions, three league titles, two league cups and a county cup. He left the club by mutual consent in October 2017 after a poor start to the 2017–18 season. He was replaced by forward Tom Greaves who took on the role of a caretaker player-manager, a decision that was made permanent on 21 November 2017. Greaves resigned in August 2018 and was replaced by Dave Chadwick as Caretaker Manager. Neil Reynolds was then appointed manager on 18 October 2018, a role he held until 11 September 2024, when he was relieved of his position after a poor start to the 2024–25 season. He was replaced by former Warrington Town manager Mark Beesley.

=== List of managers ===
Information correct after match played on 12 March 2022. Only competitive matches are counted.

Key

- Names of caretaker managers are supplied where known, and the names of caretaker managers are highlighted in italics and marked with an asterisk (*).
- Names of player-managers are supplied where known, and are marked with a double-dagger (‡).

List of F.C. United of Manchester managers
Name	Nationality	From	To	Matches	Won	Drawn (Note: Drawn matches decided by penalty shoot-outs are counted as draws.)	Lost	Win% (Note: Win% is rounded to two decimal places.)	Honours	Refs.
Karl Marginson	England	22 June 2005	24 October 2017	450	215	96	139	47.78	Northern Premier League Premier Division: Champions: 2014–15; Play-off runners-up: 2010–11, 2011–12, 2012–13; Northern Premier League Division One North: Runners-up: 2007–08; Play-off winners 2007–08; Northern Premier League President's Cup winners: 2007–08; North West Counties League Division One champions: 2006–07; North West Counties League Challenge Cup winners: 2006–07; North West Counties League Division Two champions: 2005–06; Manchester Premier Cup winners: 2016–17; Supporters Direct Cup winners: 2006	
Tom Greaves* ‡	England	24 October 2017	21 November 2017							
Tom Greaves	England	21 November 2017	29 August 2018	35	12	6	17	34.29	Manchester Premier Cup winners: 2017–18	
David Chadwick*	England	29 August 2018	18 October 2018	6	0	3	3	0.00		
Neil Reynolds	England	18 October 2018	11 September 2024	114	45	26	43	39.47	Brian Lomax Trophy winners: 2021	
Mark Beesley	England	22 September 2024	Present							

=== Current coaching staff ===
Name	Role
(England) Mark Beesley	Manager
(England) David Raven	Assistant manager
(Canada) Callum Greenwood	Goalkeeper coach
(England) Olivia Smith	Head physio
(England) Joseph Winskill	Kitman
(England) Elsie Baxter	Women's Team Coach
(England) Mark Thomas	Assistant head coach

== Honours ==
F.C. United have won three league titles, two league cups and two county cups in their history.

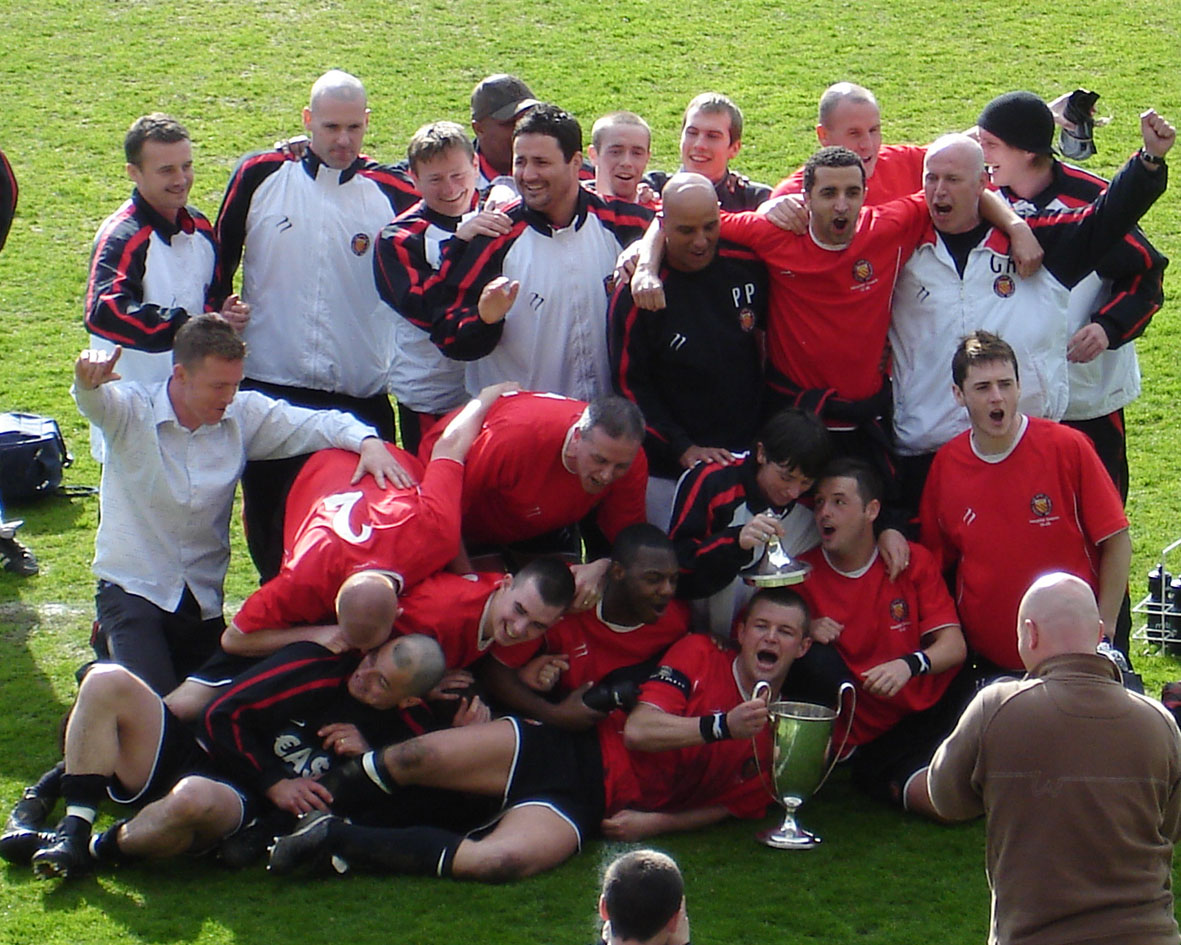
F.C. United were crowned champions of the North West Counties Football League Division Two in their inaugural season (2005–06).

- Northern Premier League Premier Division
  - Champions 2014–15
  - Play-off runners-up 2010–11, 2011–12, 2012–13
- Northern Premier League Division One North
  - Runners-up 2007–08
  - Play-off winners 2007–08
- Northern Premier League President's Cup
  - Winners 2007–08
- North West Counties League Division One
  - Champions 2006–07
- North West Counties League Division Two
  - Champions 2005–06
- North West Counties League Challenge Cup
  - Winners 2006–07
- Fenix Trophy
  - Winners 2021–22, 2023–24
- Manchester Premier Cup
  - Winners 2016–17, 2017–18
- Supporters Direct Cup
  - Winners 2006
- Brian Lomax Trophy
  - Winners 2021

== Records ==
- Best FA Cup performance: Second round, 2010–11
- Best FA Trophy performance: Quarter Final, 2014–15
- Best FA Vase performance: Third round, 2006–07

== In European competitions ==
Season	Competition	Round	Opposition	Home	Away	Aggregate
2021–22	Fenix Trophy	Group B	(Poland) AKS Zły	10–0	1–6	1st
2021–22	Fenix Trophy	Group B	(Italy) Brera	2–1	1–3	1st
2021–22	Fenix Trophy	Final	(Czech Republic) Prague Raptors	2–0 (N)		
2022–23	Fenix Trophy	Group A	(Belgium) KSK Beveren	4–1	2–3	1st
2022–23	Fenix Trophy	Group A	(Spain) CD Cuenca-Mestallistes	12–0	2–5	1st
2022–23	Fenix Trophy	Semi-final	(Denmark) BK Skjold	3–2 (N)		
2022–23	Fenix Trophy	Third place play-off	(Italy) Brera	1–0 (N)		
2023–24	Fenix Trophy	Group C	(Poland) Krakow Dragoons	14–0	1–4	1st
2023–24	Fenix Trophy	Group C	(France) Vinsky FC	4–1	0–4	1st
2023–24	Fenix Trophy	Semi-final	(England) Lewes	1–0 (N)		
2023–24	Fenix Trophy	Final	(Czech Republic) Prague Raptors	4–0 (N)		
2024–25	Fenix Trophy	Round of 16	(Czech Republic) Prague Raptors	5–0	0–3	8–0
2024–25	Fenix Trophy	Quarter-final	(Montenegro) FC Fans United	4–1	1–0	4–2
2024–25	Fenix Trophy	Semi-final	(England) Avro	2–1 (N)		
2024–25	Fenix Trophy	Final	(Scotland) Caledonian Braves	3–1 (N)		

== Women's team ==
F.C. United's women's team competed for the first time in the 2012–13 season. They finished second in the Greater Manchester Women's Football League behind Manchester City Ladies. They also reached the GMWFL League Cup final but lost 0–1 to Manchester City Ladies. After finishing runners-up again in 2013–14, the team won a league and cup double in 2015, gaining promotion to the North West Women's Regional Football League Division One South. They finished runners-up in the two following seasons, behind MSB Woolton Ladies in 2015–16 and Merseyrail Bootle in 2016–17, winning a league and county cup in the latter season. In 2017–18, the team won their first Treble, defending the league and county cups and securing a promotion to the North West Women's Regional Football League Premier Division after an unbeaten league campaign. After two seasons that were curtailed by the COVID-19 pandemic with no promotion or relegation, F.C. United were among various women's teams that gained promotion through an application process. As a result, the team reached the 4th division for the first time in their history. In 2023–24, they were relegated back to North West Women's Regional Football League.

As of August 2026, they are managed by Elsie Baxter.

F.C. United of Manchester Women's league and cup history
Season	Division	Level	Position	Average league att.	Top league goal scorer	FA Cup	Cup
2012–13	Greater Manchester Women's Football League Premier Division	7	2nd/9	—	—	—	Final
2013–14	Greater Manchester Women's Football League Division One	7	2nd/7	—	—	—	Semi-finals (Challenge Cup); Winners (League Cup) (Shared with Middleton Athletic)
2014–15	Greater Manchester Women's Football League Division One	7	1st/6	—	—	—	Winners (Challenge Cup); Semi-finals (League Cup)
2015–16	North West Women's Regional Football League Division One South	6	2nd/8	—	—	—	Runners-up (Manchester FA Cup)
2016–17	North West Women's Regional Football League Division One South	6	2nd/12	—	—	3QR	Winners (Manchester FA Cup); Winners (Argyle Cup)
2017–18	North West Women's Regional Football League Division One South	6	1st/10	115	Jessica Battle (46)	2QR	Winners (Manchester FA Cup); Winners (Argyle Cup)
2018–19	North West Women's Regional Football League Premier Division	5	2nd/11	105	Jessica Battle (32)	R1	Winners (Manchester FA Cup); Winners (Argyle Cup)
2019–20	North West Women's Regional Football League Premier Division	5	N/A (Note: The 2019–20 season was cancelled partway through due to the COVID-19 pandemic, and the FA ruled that league results would be expunged for Tiers 3 to 7.)	—	N/A (Note: Due to the season's results being expunged, there were no goals officially recorded)	2QR	
2020–21	North West Women's Regional Football League Premier Division	5	2nd/11 (Note: The 2020–21 season was ruled as incomplete, with the club gaining promotion though the FA's application process.)	—	—	R1	
2021–22	FA Women's National League Division One North	4	10th/12			R1	
2022–23	North West Women's Regional Football League Premier Division	5	1st/11	—	—	R1	
2023–24	FA Women's National League Division One North	4	12th			R2	Winners (Manchester FA Cup)
2024–25	North West Women's Regional Football League Premier Division	5	10/11			3QR	

== See also ==
- List of fan-owned sports teams
