= Vinsky FC =

French football club

Vinsky Football Club is an association football club based in Magnanville, France.

== History ==
Vinsky FC was founded in 2017.

Joined their first European Competition by participating in the FENIX Trophy (a UEFA sanctioned competition for non-professional association football clubs) for the 2023-24 season. Their first fixture in the tournament being a group stage game where Vinsky came out as Victors beating Krakow Dragoons FC 2-1 on the 25th, October.
