= Gamle Oslo FK =

- Full name: Gamle Oslo Fotballklubb
- Founded: 2017
- Ground: Bjølsen kunstgress, Oslo
- Manager: Adam Larsen Kwarasey
- League: Third Division
- 2025: Third Division group 1, 4th of 14

Gamle Oslo Fotballklubb is a Norwegian association football club from Oslo.

The club was founded by Adam Larsen Kwarasey, David Driscoll, Kelepha Sarr and Andreas Holzweiler in 2017. The club started its league existence by taking over the licence of Hammersborg FK, which went defunct. Kwarasey became manager and Holzweiler shirt sponsors. However, the club was denied its desired name, FC Oslo, because it was deemed to pretentious.

The men's football team instantly won promotion from the 2018 6. divisjon and the 2019 5. divisjon, reaching the 2021 4. divisjon. The team then reached the first round of the 2022 Norwegian Football Cup. The climb was aided by signing several former professional players, many with ties to Vålerenga, including Muhamed Keita.

== History ==
Season		Pos.	Pl.	W	D	L	GS	GA	P	Cup	Notes
2018	6. divisjon	↑ 1	18	18	0	0	116	14	54		Promoted
2019	5. divisjon	↑ 1	18	17	0	1	80	14	51		Promoted
2020	4. divisjon	Season cancelled									
2021	4. divisjon	2	13	9	2	2	31	15	29		
2022	4. divisjon	2	22	18	2	2	93	23	70	1st round	
2023	4. divisjon	↑ 1	22	20	0	2	92	20	60		Promoted
2024	3. divisjon	4	26	16	5	5	71	46	53	1st round	
2025	3. divisjon	4	26	11	7	8	68	48	40	2nd round	
2026	3. divisjon									2nd round	
