= AKS Zły =

Football club in Poland

- Full name: Alternatywny Klub Sportowy Zły
- Founded: 15 August 2015; 10 years ago
- Ground: Don Pedro Arena (football)
- Website: aks-zly.pl
Home colours	colours

Alternatywny Klub Sportowy Zły (transl. Alternative Sports' Club Evil; AKS Zły) is a multi-sports club based in Warsaw, Poland. Initially formed as a men's and women's association football club, it has since started operating basketball and ultimate departments. AKS Zły operates as a grassroots, member-managed club, combining football competition with community and social initiatives.

== Overview ==
AKS Zły (also referred to as AKS Bad or AKS Evil in some translations) is a fan-owned, democratic football club based in the Praga district of Warsaw, Poland. It was founded in 2015 by a group of football fans. The club’s name is derived from Leopold Tyrmand's 1955 novel Zły. From its inception, AKS Zły has operated as a non-profit organisation, with all members holding equal voting rights and co-owning the club. Decisions are made collectively, and no single owner or president has overriding authority.

The club established both men’s and women’s teams simultaneously and later expanded to include youth sections and an ultimate frisbee team. As of the 2025/6 season AKS Zły's teams compete in the lower tiers of Polish football, with the men’s team in the eighth tier, Klasa A, and the women’s team in the third tier, II liga. The club also conducts activities integrating refugees and local community members.

The stadium associated with the club is known as Don Pedro Arena. The club has rules for fan behaviour in the stands, including prohibitions on aggression, swearing, and discrimination. AKS Zły participates in cultural and social activities beyond football, including concerts, exhibitions, and community projects.

In 2019, AKS Zły received UEFA's Grassroots Golden Award for promoting equality, integration, and community engagement. In the same year, both men’s and women’s teams were promoted to higher leagues.

In 2022, player Minh Pham Duc was severely beaten in Warsaw. The club described the attack as racially motivated. The incident led the club to organise matches as public demonstrations against racist violence.

In the overwhelming right-wing Polish football scene, AKS Zły is de facto considered a left-liberal club, as it promotes inclusivity, gender equality, LGBT+ acceptance, multicultural participation, and grassroots fan ownership, even though the club itself does not formally identify with any political ideology.
