= Ashton United F.C. =

Association football club in Greater Manchester, England

Coordinates: 53°30′05″N 2°04′47″W

Ashton United
- Full name: Ashton United Football Club
- Nickname: The Robins
- Founded: 1878
- Ground: Hurst Cross, Ashton-under-Lyne
- Capacity: 4,500 (250 seated)
- Chairman: David Burke & Jonathan Sayer
- Manager: Steve Cunningham
- League: Northern Premier League Premier Division
- 2025–26: Northern Premier League Premier Division, 10th of 21
- Website: ashtonunited.co.uk
Home colours	Away colours

Ashton United Football Club is a football club in Ashton-under-Lyne, Greater Manchester, England. They are currently members of the Northern Premier League Premier Division, the seventh tier of English football, and play at Hurst Cross. Established as Hurst in 1878, the club folded in 1892 before being re-formed in 1909 and renamed Ashton United in 1947.

== History ==
The club was founded in 1878 as Hurst Football Club and the earliest known match report dates back to a game against Hurst Red Star on 16 March 1879. They originally played in black-and-white stripes and were nicknamed the Lambs. The club first entered the FA Cup in 1883, beating Turton 3–1 in the first round, and then Irwell Springs 3–2 in the second. However, the result was annulled after a protest from Irwell, and it was they who advanced to the third round after Hurst refused to play the replay. In 1885 they won the first edition of the Manchester Senior Cup, beating Newton Heath (now Manchester United) 3–0 in the final. In the same year they reached the second round of the FA Cup again. However, although they defeated Halliwell 3–1, the result was annulled again. Hurst refused to play the replay and Halliwell advanced to the third round. The club joined the Ashton & District League in 1891, but after finishing ninth in the league in the 1891–92 season, it was reported in June 1892 that they had folded.

Hurst Football Club was re-formed in April 1909, when there was a meeting of former members and players and it was decided to form a committee to revive the club to play at the Hurst Cross ground. The re-formed club were admitted to the Manchester League as it was expanded from 16 to 18 clubs. In their first season in the league, they finished level on points at the top of the table with Salford United, resulting in a play-off for the championship, which Salford won 2–1. After finishing sixth in 1910–11, the club won the league title in 1911–12 and subsequently joined Division Two of the Lancashire Combination. Although they only finished fifth in 1912–13, they were promoted to Division One of the league for the 1913–14 season. Due to the outbreak of World War I, the club did not compete in 1915–16, but re-entered a wartime edition of the league for the 1916–17 season, winning the title. However, they did not compete during the following season. They resumed in the Lancashire Combination in 1918–19, but switched to the Cheshire County League in 1923. Players started wearing red shirts, earning the club a new nickname – the Robins.

Shortly before World War II, Hurst signed Dixie Dean, but the outbreak of hostilities limited him to a handful of appearances for the club. Following the war, the club resumed playing in the Cheshire County League for the 1945–46 season, changing their name to Ashton United on 1 February 1947. Despite finishing second bottom of the league in 1946–47, they applied for election to the Football League, but the four Football League clubs were re-elected without a vote being taken. They subsequently rejoined the Lancashire Combination in 1948 and were placed in Division One. After finishing twelfth in 1960–61, the club resigned from the league in order to apply to rejoin the Cheshire County League; in a ballot, they were defeated by Altrincham and Wigan Athletic, and so had to rejoin the Lancashire Combination. However, Division One was now full, so the club had to drop into Division Two, which they won in 1961–62 to earn promotion back to Division One.

In 1964 Ashton United switched to the Midland Counties League, where they played for two seasons before moving back to Division Two of the Lancashire Combination in 1966. Two seasons later, they moved across to the Cheshire County League, where they remained until it merged with the Lancashire Combination to form the North West Counties League in 1982. The club were placed in Division One of the new league, but were relegated to Division Two after finishing second-from-bottom in 1983–84. After winning Division Two in 1987–88 they were promoted back to Division One. The 1991–92 season saw them win the Division One title, earning promotion to Division One of the Northern Premier League. They remained in the division until a third-place finish in 2001–02 saw them qualify for the promotion play-offs. After a 3–1 win over Spennymoor United in the semi-finals, a 2–1 win over Bamber Bridge in the final saw them promoted to the Premier Division. In that season, Ashton's Gareth Morris scored what is thought to be the fastest goal in FA Cup history, netting after only four seconds against Skelmersdale United.

With the creation of the Conference North in 2004, a 14th-place finish in 2003–04 saw Ashton United play-off against Hyde United and Bradford Park Avenue for the right to play in the new league. Following a 2–1 win over Hyde, they lost 2–1 to Bradford Park Avenue in the final. However, after the demise of Telford United, an extra place became available in the new structure and Ashton took their place in the Conference North. The following season saw them finish second-from-bottom, resulting in relegation back to the Northern Premier League's Premier Division. In 2010 the club were ordered to pay £32,000 to Marcus Hallows after he was injured playing against Ashton for Altrincham.

In 2010–11 Ashton United won the Northern Premier League Challenge Cup, beating Northwich Victoria 1–0 in the final. After finishing fifth in 2013–14 the club qualified for the promotion play-offs; however, after beating F.C. United of Manchester 2–1 after extra time, they lost the final to AFC Fylde on penalties after a 1–1 draw. The 2014–15 season saw a third-place finish, again qualifying for the promotion play-offs, in which they lost on penalties to local rivals Curzon Ashton after a 1–1 draw. A third consecutive play-off campaign followed a fourth-place finish in 2015–16, but saw the club lose 3–1 to Salford City in the semi-finals. In 2017–18 they were Premier Division runners-up; in the play-offs they defeated Farsley Celtic 2–0 in the semi-finals, before beating Grantham Town in the final to earn promotion back to the renamed National League North; they were relegated back to the Northern Premier League at the end of the following season after finishing third-from-bottom.

Ashton United finished fifth in the Premier Division in 2024–25, going on to lose 2–1 to Worksop Town in the play-off semi-finals.

== Ground ==
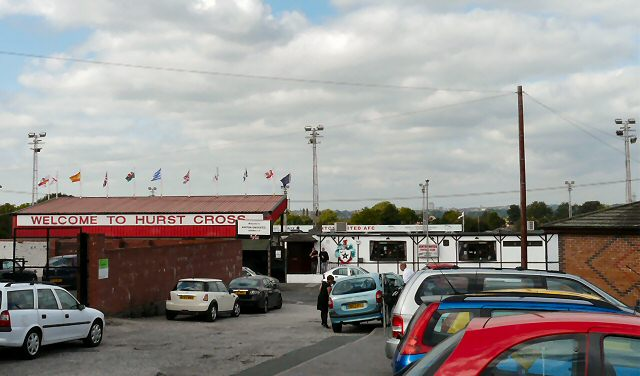
Hurst Cross entrance

The club initially played at Holebottom on Smallshaw, before moving to Rosehill and then to nearby Hurst Cross for their first fixture played on 27 September 1884, making the ground one of the oldest football venues in the world. The following year saw a record crowd of over 9,000 attend a Lancashire Senior Cup match against Blackburn Rovers. Floodlights were installed in 1953 and inaugurated with a 4–3 win over Wigan Athletic on 29 September that year; club record goalscorer Stuart Dimond getting the club's first goal under lights. During the 1954–55 season Hurst Cross staged the first Football Association-approved floodlit competition, the Lancashire and Cheshire Floodlit Cup. Ashton United, Wigan Athletic and Nelson of the Lancashire Combination and Mossley, Macclesfield Town, Droylsden, Hyde United and Stalybridge Celtic from the Cheshire County League were invited to compete for the trophy, eventually won by Hyde United. The competition was repeated the following season with Winsford United taking the place of Wigan Athletic; Hyde United were again successful.

The current capacity is 4,500, of which 250 is seated (in the Sid Sykes Stand) and 750 is covered, including the Popular Stand on the opposite side of the ground. Open terracing with a small amount of covered standing is available at both ends of the ground.

== Current squad ==
As of 15 August 2026

Note: Flags indicate national team as defined under FIFA eligibility rules; some limited exceptions apply. Players may hold more than one non-FIFA nationality.

No.	Pos.	Nation	Player
1	GK	ENG	Tommy Taylor
2	DF	COD	John Lufudu
3	DF	ENG	Reece Kendall
4	DF	ENG	Dylan Cogill
5	MF	ENG	Nathan Okome
6	MF	ENG	Callum Spooner
7	MF	ENG	Alex Byrne
8	FW	ENG	Dan Turner
9	FW	ENG	Kurt Willoughby

No.	Pos.	Nation	Player
10	FW	ENG	Darius Osei
11	MF	ENG	James Hardy
12	DF	AUS	Jack Geddes
13	GK	ENG	Jamie Owen
14	MF	ENG	Mikey O'Neill
15	MF	NED	Justin Johnson
16	DF	ENG	Mo Doro
17	MF	ENG	Spencer Knight
18	DF	ENG	Harry Flowers

== Honours ==
- Northern Premier League
  - Challenge Cup winners 2010–11
  - Division One Cup winners 1993–94, 1996–97, 1998–99
- North West Counties League
  - Division One champions 1991–92
  - Division Two champions 1987–88
  - Challenge Cup winners 1991–92
- Lancashire Combination
  - Division One champions 1916–17
  - Division Two champions 1961–62
  - League Cup winners 1961–62
- Manchester League
  - Champions 1911–12
- Manchester Senior Cup
  - Winners 1884–85, 1977–78
- Manchester Junior Cup
  - Winners 1910–11, 1932–33
- Manchester Challenge Cup
  - Winners 1935–36, 1938–39, 1949–50, 1952–53, 1953–54, 1954–55
- Manchester Intermediate Cup
  - Winners 1958–59, 1962–63
- Manchester Premier Cup
  - Winners 1979–80, 1982–83, 1991–92, 2000–01, 2001–02, 2002–03, 2021–22, 2023–24

== Records ==
- Best FA Cup performance: Second round, 1883–84, 1885–86
- Best FA Trophy performance: Quarter-finals, 1996–97
- Best FA Vase performance: Fourth round, 1992–93
- Record victory: 13–1 vs Marple (Lancashire Combination), 22 February 1919
- Worst defeat: 11–1 vs Wellington Town, Cheshire County League, 1946–47
- Record attendance: Over 9,000 vs Blackburn Rovers, Lancashire Senior Cup, 1885
- Most appearances: Johnny Burke, 410 1953–1964
- Record transfer fee received: £15,000 from Rotherham United for Karl Marginson, 1993
- Record transfer fee paid: £9,000 to Netherfield for Andy Whittaker, 1994

== See also ==
- Ashton United F.C. players
- Ashton United F.C. managers
