= CD Cuenca-Mestallistes =

Spanish football club

Cuenca
- Full name: Club Deportivo Cuenca-Metallistes 1925
- Nickname: Metallistes
- Founded: 22 May 1925; 100 years ago
- Ground: Malilla; Valencia, Spain
- Capacity: 1,000
- President: David Laguía
- League: Segona FFCV – Group 4
- 2024–25: Tercera FFCV – Group 8, 2nd of 16 (promoted via play-offs)
- Website: https://cdcuencamestallistes.com/
Home colours	Away colours

Club Deportivo Cuenca-Mestallistes 1925 is an association football club based in Valencia, Spain. Founded in 1925, they play in Segona FFCV – Group 4.

== History ==
CD Cuenca-Mestallistes was founded in 1925, and entered the Valencian Football Federation in 1933. The club suspended their activities due to the Spanish Civil War, only returning in 1940 after CD Europa and UD Calasanz merged into the structure of Cuenca to reactivate the club.

The club would play regional football until 1944, when it became Valencia CF's reserve team and was renamed CD Mestalla. In the 1950s, a new CD Cuenca was created, completely separated from Valencia's structures.

== Season to season ==
Season	Tier	Division	Place	Copa del Rey
1933–1944	—	Regional	—	
1944–1950	DNP			
1950–1979	—	Regional	—	
1979–80	8	3ª Reg.	11th	
1980–81	DNP			
1981–82	8	3ª Reg.	12th	
1982–83	8	3ª Reg.	9th	
1983–84	8	3ª Reg.	3rd	
1984–85	7	2ª Reg.	10th	
1985–86	8	3ª Reg.	10th	
1986–87	8	3ª Reg.	2nd	
1987–88	7	2ª Reg.	6th	
1988–89	7	2ª Reg.	14th	
1989–90	7	2ª Reg.	15th	
1990–91	7	2ª Reg.	8th	
1991–92	7	2ª Reg.	9th	
1992–93	7	2ª Reg.	2nd	
1993–94	7	2ª Reg.	8th	
1994–95	7	2ª Reg.	7th	
1995–96	7	2ª Reg.	7th	

Season	Tier	Division	Place	Copa del Rey
1996–97	7	2ª Reg.	10th	
1997–98	7	2ª Reg.	1st	
1998–99	6	1ª Reg.	15th	
1999–2000	7	2ª Reg.	8th	
2000–01	7	2ª Reg.	11th	
2001–02	7	2ª Reg.	2nd	
2002–03	6	1ª Reg.	15th	
2003–04	7	2ª Reg.	10th	
2004–05	7	2ª Reg.	15th	
2005–06	7	2ª Reg.	8th	
2006–07	7	2ª Reg.	8th	
2007–08	7	2ª Reg.	5th	
2008–09	7	2ª Reg.	12th	
2009–10	7	2ª Reg.	8th	
2010–11	7	2ª Reg.	5th	
2011–12	7	2ª Reg.	3rd	
2012–13	7	2ª Reg.	5th	
2013–14	7	2ª Reg.	7th	
2014–15	7	2ª Reg.	15th	
2015–16	7	2ª Reg.	9th	

Season	Tier	Division	Place	Copa del Rey
2016–17	7	2ª Reg.	8th	
2017–18	7	2ª Reg.	4th	
2018–19	7	2ª Reg.	9th	
2019–20	7	2ª Reg.	5th	
2020–21	7	2ª Reg.	2nd	
2021–22	7	1ª Reg.	12th	
2022–23	8	2ª Reg.	3rd	
2023–24	9	3ª FFCV	4th	
2024–25	9	3ª FFCV	2nd	
2025–26	8	2ª FFCV		
