= Prague Raptors FC =

Football club based in Prague, Czech Republic

Prague Raptors
- Full name: Prague Raptors Football Club z.s.
- Nickname: The Raptors
- Founded: 2017; 9 years ago
- Ground: Na Radosti, Prague 5
- Capacity: 500
- Chairman: Daz Moss
- Manager: Kim Grant
- League: Men: Class 1.A (group B) / Women: Division 2
- 2025–26: Men: 1st (promoted) / Women: 1st (promoted)
- Website: https://www.pragueraptors.com/
Home colours	Away colours

Prague Raptors Football Club is a football club based in Prague, Czech Republic.

== History ==
Prague Raptors was founded in 2017. They have been runners up in the FENIX Trophy final three times.

== Honours ==
- Fenix Trophy
  - Runners-up 2021–22, 2022–23, 2023–24
- Czech 6th League
  - 2025–26
- Czech Women's Second League
  - 2025–26
