= HFC Falke =

Association football club in Germany

Hamburger Fussball Club Falke is an association football club based in Hamburg, Germany.

== History ==
HFC Falke was founded in 2014 after a dispute involving Hamburger SV selling shares to outside investors. The club's goal is to provide football for the members, by the members.

The club's name comes from Hamburger SV's name. FC Falke FC Falke 06, HFC 88 and SC Germania 1887 all merged into Hamburger SV, and HFC Falke's name combines the three merged club's names.
