= 2020–21 Northern Premier League =

The 2020–21 season was the 53rd season of the Northern Premier League. The league consists of three divisions, the Premier Division at Step 3 of the National League System, and the West and East Divisions at Step 4.

As the previous season was terminated due to the COVID-19 pandemic, with all results removed, there were no changes in the allocations of teams for the Northern Premier League. The planned restructuring of the National League System, including the expansion of the Northern Premier League to include a further division at Step 4, was postponed until 2021–22.

For this season it was announced to member clubs that the League Cup would not take place during the season.

Due to the restrictions on clubs' ability to play matches in the COVID-19 lockdowns, competitions at Steps 3–6 were curtailed on 24 February 2021. The scheduled restructuring of non-league took place at the end of the season, with a new division added to the Northern Premier League at Step 4 for 2021–22. This resulted in 20 extra teams joining the league, either through promotions or reallocations, and some movement of teams currently in the two Division Ones.

== Premier Division ==
Northern Premier League Premier Division
- Season: 2020–21

Premier Division comprised the same set of 22 teams which competed in the aborted competition the previous season. On 1 June 2020, Mickleover Sports were renamed Mickleover F.C.

=== Premier Division table at the time of curtailment ===
Pos	Team	Pld	W	D	L	GF	GA	GD	Pts
1	Mickleover	10	7	1	2	23	11	+12	22
2	Basford United	9	6	1	2	15	9	+6	19
3	Buxton	8	5	2	1	22	11	+11	17
4	Warrington Town	9	5	1	3	16	11	+5	16
5	Witton Albion	7	5	0	2	13	7	+6	15
6	South Shields	9	4	3	2	12	8	+4	15
7	Whitby Town	9	4	2	3	15	14	+1	14
8	Matlock Town	6	4	1	1	10	4	+6	13
9	Atherton Collieries	8	4	1	3	13	8	+5	13
10	Gainsborough Trinity	8	4	0	4	13	12	+1	12
11	Scarborough Athletic	8	3	2	3	10	11	−1	11
12	Lancaster City	7	2	4	1	12	10	+2	10
13	FC United of Manchester	7	2	4	1	9	7	+2	10
14	Radcliffe	9	3	1	5	15	23	−8	10
15	Nantwich Town	6	2	3	1	10	10	0	9
16	Morpeth Town	7	2	3	2	9	10	−1	9
17	Hyde United	6	1	3	2	5	6	−1	6
18	Stalybridge Celtic	9	1	3	5	7	17	−10	6
19	Ashton United	7	1	2	4	5	13	−8	5
20	Bamber Bridge	9	1	1	7	6	17	−11	4
21	Grantham Town	8	0	3	5	5	14	−9	3
22	Stafford Rangers	8	0	1	7	3	15	−12	1

Source: NPL official site
Rules for classification: 1) points; 2) goal difference; 3) number of goals scored; 4) number of matches won; 5) head-to-head results

=== Top 10 goalscorers ===
Rank	Player	Club	Goals
1	(Italy) Diego De Girolamo	Buxton	8
2	(England) Nathan Cartman	Scarborough Athletic	6
2	(England) Jason Gilchrist	South Shields	6
4	(Saint Kitts and Nevis) Jacob Hazel	Whitby Town	5
4	(England) Rod Orlando-Young	Gainsborough Trinity	5
6	(France) Jean-Louis Akpa Akpro	Radcliffe	4
6	(England) Josh Amis	Warrington Town	4
6	(England) Scott Bakkor	Witton Albion	4
6	(England) Stuart Beavon	Mickleover	4
6	(England) Bohan Dixon	Warrington Town	4
6	(England) Marcus Giles	Whitby Town	4

Updated to matches played on 3 November 2020

=== Results table ===
Home \ Away	ASH	ATH	BAM	BAS	BUX	UOM	GAI	GRA	HYD	LNC	MAT	MIC	MOR	NAN	RAD	SCA	SOU	STA	STL	WAR	WHI	WIT
Ashton United			0–0									0–3					3–3					
Atherton Collieries	1–0		5–0													0–2			1–1			
Bamber Bridge					1–2		0–1				1–0						1–3					
Basford United			2–1													4–1		1–0		0–2		
Buxton												2–2			4–2	4–1		3–1			2–2	
FC United of Manchester										1–1				1–1		0–0		2–1		3–1		
Gainsborough Trinity									2–0								0–1		3–2		5–1	1–3
Grantham Town		1–2								2–4	0–1							1–1	0–0			
Hyde United						2–2				1–1							0–0					
Lancaster City				1–2									2–2							2–1		
Matlock Town	4–1			2–2														2–0				
Mickleover								3–0	1–0				1–2		4–1					3–2		2–1
Morpeth Town			2–1					1–1														
Nantwich Town					2–1							0–4							3–0			
Radcliffe			2–1	0–3			2–1														3–3	1–4
Scarborough Athletic														1–1							2–1	
South Shields						1–0					0–1	3–0	0–0		1–3							
Stafford Rangers	0–1	0–3							0–2													
Stalybridge Celtic				0–1	0–4					1–1			3–1			0–3						
Warrington Town		2–0					3–0							2–2	2–1						1–0	
Whitby Town	2–0							2–0														
Witton Albion		2–1		2–0												1–0					0–2	

Source: NPL Premier Division results grid
Legend: Blue = home team win; Yellow = draw; Red = away team win.

=== Stadia and locations ===
Locations of the 2020–21 Premier Division clubs
Locations of Northern Premier League 2019–20 Division One North West teams (Greater Manchester)

Club	Location	Ground	Capacity
Ashton United	Ashton-under-Lyne	Hurst Cross	4,500
Atherton Collieries	Atherton	Alder Street	2,500
Bamber Bridge	Bamber Bridge	Irongate	2,264
Basford United	Nottingham (Basford)	Greenwich Avenue	2,200
Buxton	Buxton	The Silverlands	5,200
FC United of Manchester	Manchester (Moston)	Broadhurst Park	4,400
Gainsborough Trinity	Gainsborough	The Northolme	4,304
Grantham Town	Grantham	South Kesteven Sports Stadium	7,500
Hyde United	Hyde	Ewen Fields	4,250
Lancaster City	Lancaster	Giant Axe	3,500
Matlock Town	Matlock	Causeway Lane	2,214
Mickleover	Derby (Mickleover)	Station Road	1,500
Morpeth Town	Morpeth	Craik Park	1,500
Nantwich Town	Nantwich	The Weaver Stadium	3,500
Radcliffe	Radcliffe	Stainton Park	3,500
Scarborough Athletic	Scarborough	Flamingo Land Stadium	2,833
South Shields	South Shields	Mariners Park	3,500
Stafford Rangers	Stafford	Marston Road	4,000
Stalybridge Celtic	Stalybridge	Bower Fold	6,500
Warrington Town	Warrington	Cantilever Park	3,500
Whitby Town	Whitby	Turnbull Ground	3,500
Witton Albion	Northwich	Wincham Park	4,813

== Division One North West ==
Northern Premier League Division One North West
- Season: 2020–21

The division was renamed to Division One North West instead of Division One West from the previous season. Division One North West comprised 19 teams, one fewer than the previous season, following Droylsden's resignation from NPL.

=== Division One North-West table at the time of curtailment ===
Pos	Team	Pld	W	D	L	GF	GA	GD	Pts	Qualification
1	Colne	9	7	1	1	20	9	+11	22	
2	Ramsbottom United	8	6	1	1	19	9	+10	19	
3	Workington	9	5	4	0	19	9	+10	19	
4	Clitheroe	9	5	3	1	15	9	+6	18	
5	Dunston	7	5	1	1	13	8	+5	16	Transferred to the NPL Division One East
6	Marine	7	5	0	2	16	5	+11	15	
7	Runcorn Linnets	8	4	3	1	15	11	+4	15	
8	Marske United	5	3	2	0	14	5	+9	11	Transferred to the NPL Division One East
9	Tadcaster Albion	8	3	2	3	13	10	+3	11	Transferred to the NPL Division One East
10	City of Liverpool	9	3	1	5	19	21	−2	10	
11	Kendal Town	12	2	4	6	11	22	−11	10	
12	Widnes	9	2	2	5	8	15	−7	8	
13	Mossley	7	2	1	4	10	11	−1	7	
14	Trafford	7	1	4	2	8	11	−3	7	
15	Prescot Cables	9	2	1	6	11	15	−4	7	
16	Pickering Town	9	2	1	6	8	19	−11	7	Transferred to the NPL Division One East
17	Brighouse Town	8	1	2	5	13	20	−7	5	Transferred to the NPL Division One East
18	Pontefract Collieries	8	1	2	5	8	22	−14	5	Transferred to the NPL Division One East
19	Ossett United	8	1	1	6	6	15	−9	4	Transferred to the NPL Division One East

Source: NPL official site
Rules for classification: 1) points; 2) goal difference; 3) number of goals scored; 4) number of matches won; 5) head-to-head results

=== Top 10 goalscorers ===
Rank	Player	Club	Goals
1	(England) Matty Tymon	Marske United	7
2	(England) Jamie Cooke	Colne	6
2	(England) Reuben Jerome	Workington	6
4	(England) Scott Allison	Workington	5
4	(England) Nathan Burke	City of Liverpool	5
4	(England) Sefton Gonzales	Ramsbottom United	5

Updated to matches played on November 4, 2020

=== Results table ===
Home \ Away	BRI	CLI	CLN	COL	DUN	KEN	MAR	MRS	MOS	OSS	PIC	PON	PRE	RAM	RUN	TAD	TRA	WID	WOR
Brighouse Town		1–2		2–5	3–4							2–0			3–3				
Clitheroe													1–0	3–1			2–2		
Colne				4–2								6–2							0–1
City of Liverpool								2–4									1–0		
Dunston			0–1				2–1						3–2			1–1			
Kendal Town				1–0					2–2						2–3	0–3			0–0
Marine			1–2								4–0					2–0			
Marske United	3–0									1–1							5–1		
Mossley		1–3								2–0	4–1				1–2				
Ossett United			0–1		0–2													3–2	0–3
Pickering Town	1–0				0–1	0–1				2–1		2–3							2–2
Pontefract Collieries								1–1							1–1				
Prescot Cables				2–2		2–0													
Ramsbottom United						2–2				2–1	3–0	3–0	2–1						
Runcorn Linnets		1–1														4–2			
Tadcaster Albion												3–0	3–1	1–2					
Trafford						2–0										0–0		1–1	
Widnes			1–1				0–2		1–0				1–3	1–4					
Workington		2–1		5–2					2–0							2–2			

Source: NPL First Division East results grid
Legend: Blue = home team win; Yellow = draw; Red = away team win.

=== Stadia and locations ===
Locations of Northern Premier League 2020–21 Division One North West teams

Team	Location	Stadium	Capacity
Brighouse Town	Brighouse	St Giles Road	1,000
City of Liverpool	Aintree	New Bucks Park	3,750
Clitheroe	Clitheroe	Shawbridge	2,000
Colne	Colne	Holt House	1,800
Dunston	Dunston	Wellington Road	2,500
Kendal Town	Kendal	Parkside Road	2,400
Marine	Crosby	Marine Travel Arena	3,185
Marske United	Marske-by-the-Sea	Mount Pleasant	2,500
Mossley	Mossley	Seel Park	4,000
Ossett United	Ossett	Ingfield	1,950
Pickering Town	Pickering	Mill Lane	2,000
Pontefract Collieries	Pontefract	Harratt Nissan Stadium	1,200
Prescot Cables	Prescot	Valerie Park	3,200
Ramsbottom United	Ramsbottom	The Harry Williams Riverside	2,000
Runcorn Linnets	Runcorn	Millbank Linnets Stadium	1,600
Tadcaster Albion	Tadcaster	Ings Lane	2,000
Trafford	Urmston	Shawe View	2,500
Widnes	Widnes	Select Security Stadium	13,350
Workington	Workington	Borough Park	3,101

== Division One South East ==
Northern Premier League Division One South East
- Season: 2020–21

Division One South East comprised the same set of 20 teams which competed in the aborted competition the previous season.

=== Division One South-East table at the time of curtailment ===
Pos	Team	Pld	W	D	L	GF	GA	GD	Pts	Qualification
1	Leek Town	8	6	1	1	26	9	+17	19	Transferred to the NPL Division One West
2	Loughborough Dynamo	8	6	1	1	16	9	+7	19	Transferred to the NPL Division One Midlands
3	Newcastle Town	8	5	2	1	17	9	+8	17	Transferred to the NPL Division One West
4	Kidsgrove Athletic	7	5	1	1	13	7	+6	16	Transferred to the NPL Division One West
5	Chasetown	9	5	1	3	18	13	+5	16	Transferred to the NPL Division One Midlands
6	Worksop Town	7	4	2	1	20	9	+11	14	
7	Belper Town	9	4	2	3	25	15	+10	14	Transferred to the NPL Division One Midlands
8	Stamford	7	3	4	0	20	6	+14	13	Transferred to the NPL Division One Midlands
9	Lincoln United	7	4	1	2	21	11	+10	13	
10	Ilkeston Town	7	4	1	2	17	14	+3	13	Transferred to the NPL Division One Midlands
11	Carlton Town	9	3	2	4	13	14	−1	11	Transferred to the NPL Division One Midlands
12	Sutton Coldfield Town	8	3	2	3	13	22	−9	11	Transferred to the NPL Division One Midlands
13	Frickley Athletic	8	3	0	5	14	14	0	9	
14	Stocksbridge Park Steels	9	3	0	6	16	25	−9	9	
15	Cleethorpes Town	8	2	2	4	14	14	0	8	
16	Glossop North End	9	2	2	5	7	21	−14	8	Transferred to the NPL Division One West
17	Spalding United	8	2	1	5	11	14	−3	7	Transferred to the NPL Division One Midlands
18	Sheffield	6	1	1	4	4	10	−6	4	
19	Wisbech Town	8	1	0	7	5	26	−21	3	Transferred to the NPL Division One Midlands
20	Market Drayton Town	8	0	0	8	2	30	−28	0	Transferred to the NPL Division One West

Source: NPL official site
Rules for classification: 1) points; 2) goal difference; 3) number of goals scored; 4) number of matches won; 5) head-to-head results

=== Top 10 goalscorers ===
Rank	Player	Club	Goals
1	(England) Jonathon Margetts	Frickley Athletic	8
1	(England) Alex Troke	Ilkeston Town	8
3	(England) Joey Butlin	Chasetown	7
3	(England) Matthew Cotton	Lincoln United	7
3	(England) Ryan McLean	Newcastle Town	7
6	(England) Curtis Burrows	Loughborough Dynamo	6
6	(England) Timothy Grice	Leek Town	6
6	(England) Scott Vernon	Cleethorpes Town	6
Seven others on 5 goals

Updated to matches played on 3 November 2020

=== Results table ===
Home \ Away	BEL	CAR	CHA	CLE	FRI	GNE	ILK	KID	LEE	LIN	LOU	MAR	NEW	SHE	SPA	STA	STO	SUT	WIS	WOR
Belper Town			0–1									4–0			3–3			7–1		2–2
Carlton Town									1–2	1–3						1–1			4–0	
Chasetwon					2–3			1–3					3–0			2–2	2–1			
Cleethorpes Town	2–0						2–3								3–1					
Frickley Athletic	1–4	0–3										4–0		1–2						
Glossop North End	1–2			2–1	2–1			0–0					0–0							
Ilkeston Town			2–1						2–3							2–2				
Kidsgrove Athletic									1–0			3–0		2–1						
Leek Town				3–2								6–0					6–2		5–0	
Lincoln United				1–1		5–0											3–4		2–0	
Loughborough Dynamo				1–1		2–1									1–0				3–0	
Market Drayton Town			1–3				1–5				0–3							0–2		
Newcastle Town		6–1			1–0		4–1							0–0						
Sheffield		0–2									1–2						0–3			
Spalding United		2–0	1–3				1–2											3–0		
Stamford						5–0				5–1							5–0			0–0
Stocksbridge Park Steels	4–3							0–1			0–2		2–3							
Sutton Coldfield Town		0–0						5–3	1–1	0–6										
Wisbech Town				3–2	0–4								2–3							0–3
Worksop Town						5–1					6–2				2–0			2–4		

Source: NPL South East Division results grid
Legend: Blue = home team win; Yellow = draw; Red = away team win.

=== Stadia and locations ===
Locations of Northern Premier League 2020–21 Division One South East teams

Team	Location	Stadium	Capacity
Belper Town	Belper	Christchurch Meadow	2,650
Carlton Town	Carlton	Bill Stokeld Stadium	1,500
Chasetown	Burntwood	The Scholars Ground	2,000
Cleethorpes Town	Grimsby	Bradley Football Centre	1,000
Frickley Athletic	South Elmsall	Westfield Lane	2,087
Glossop North End	Glossop	The Amdec Forklift Stadium	1,350
Ilkeston Town	Ilkeston	New Manor Ground	3,029
Kidsgrove Athletic	Kidsgrove	The Autonet Insurance Stadium	2,000
Leek Town	Leek	Harrison Park	3,600
Lincoln United	Lincoln	Ashby Avenue	2,200
Loughborough Dynamo	Loughborough	Nanpantan Sports Ground	1,500
Market Drayton Town	Market Drayton	Greenfields Sports Ground	1,000
Newcastle Town	Newcastle-under-Lyme	Lyme Valley Stadium	4,000
Sheffield	Dronfield	Coach and Horses Ground	2,089
Spalding United	Spalding	Sir Halley Stewart Field	3,500
Stamford	Stamford	Borderville Sports Centre	2,000
Stocksbridge Park Steels	Stocksbridge	Bracken Moor	3,500
Sutton Coldfield Town	Sutton Coldfield	Central Ground	2,000
Wisbech Town	Wisbech	Fenland Stadium	1,118
Worksop Town	Worksop	Sandy Lane	2,500

== Challenge Cup ==
2020–21 Integro League Cup
Tournament details
- Country: England
- Teams: 62

The 2020–21 Northern Premier League Challenge Cup, known as the 2020–21 Tysers League Cup for sponsorship reasons, did not take place due to the coronavirus pandemic-originated lockdowns.

The defending champions were Trafford.

== See also ==
- Northern Premier League
- 2020–21 Isthmian League
- 2020–21 Southern League
