= 2008–09 Northern Premier League =

The 2008–09 was the 41st season for the Northern Premier League Premier Division, and the second season for the Northern Premier League Division One North and South.

As continuing part of non-league restructuring, the Division One South temporarily had 20 teams, while the Division One North contained 21, with a targeted number for both of 22 teams. This naturally affected the number of relegation slots available during the season, as the league attempted to enlarge the size of the divisions at the end of the season.

== Premier Division ==
Northern Premier League Premier Division
- Season: 2008–09
- Champions: Eastwood Town
- Promoted: Eastwood Town; Ilkeston Town
- Relegated: Cammell Laird; Witton Albion; Leigh Genesis; Prescot Cables
- Matches: 465
- Goals: 1,437 (3.09 per match)

The Premier Division features six new clubs:

- Leigh Genesis before Season as Leigh RMI, relegated from the Conference North
- Boston United, relegated from the Conference North
- Bradford Park Avenue, promoted from NPL Division One North
- F.C. United of Manchester, promoted via play-offs from NPL Division One North
- Cammell Laird, promoted from NPL Division One South
- Nantwich Town, promoted via play-offs from NPL Division One South

=== League table ===
| Pos | Team | Pld | W | D | L | GF | GA | GD | Pts | Promotion or relegation |
|---|---|---|---|---|---|---|---|---|---|---|
| 1 | Eastwood Town (C, P) | 42 | 25 | 12 | 5 | 82 | 37 | +45 | 87 | Promotion to Conference North |
| 2 | Ilkeston Town (P) | 42 | 23 | 13 | 6 | 59 | 34 | +25 | 82 | Qualification for Play-offs |
| 3 | Nantwich Town | 42 | 22 | 10 | 10 | 83 | 41 | +42 | 76 | Qualification for Play-offs |
| 4 | Guiseley | 42 | 22 | 10 | 10 | 98 | 60 | +38 | 76 | Qualification for Play-offs |
| 5 | Kendal Town | 42 | 21 | 11 | 10 | 85 | 63 | +22 | 74 | Qualification for Play-offs |
| 6 | F.C. United of Manchester | 42 | 21 | 9 | 12 | 82 | 58 | +24 | 72 | |
| 7 | Bradford Park Avenue | 42 | 20 | 12 | 10 | 74 | 52 | +22 | 72 | |
| 8 | Hednesford Town | 42 | 21 | 6 | 15 | 78 | 52 | +26 | 69 | Transferred to the Southern League Premier Division |
| 9 | Ashton United | 42 | 16 | 10 | 16 | 71 | 75 | −4 | 58 | |
| 10 | North Ferriby United | 42 | 16 | 6 | 20 | 67 | 65 | +2 | 54 | |
| 11 | Frickley Athletic | 42 | 13 | 15 | 14 | 50 | 58 | −8 | 54 | |
| 12 | Ossett Town | 42 | 15 | 8 | 19 | 71 | 74 | −3 | 53 | |
| 13 | Marine | 42 | 15 | 6 | 21 | 54 | 75 | −21 | 51 | |
| 14 | Buxton | 42 | 13 | 10 | 19 | 56 | 58 | −2 | 49 | |
| 15 | Matlock Town | 42 | 12 | 13 | 17 | 65 | 74 | −9 | 49 | |
| 16 | Boston United | 42 | 12 | 13 | 17 | 38 | 52 | −14 | 49 | |
| 17 | Worksop Town | 42 | 12 | 12 | 18 | 48 | 87 | −39 | 48 | |
| 18 | Cammell Laird (R) | 42 | 12 | 11 | 19 | 58 | 70 | −12 | 47 (Note: Cammell Laird relegated due to ground grading issues. Whitby Town reprieved.) | Relegation to NPL Division One South |
| 19 | Whitby Town | 42 | 12 | 10 | 20 | 58 | 71 | −13 | 46 | |
| 20 | Witton Albion (R) | 42 | 12 | 6 | 24 | 53 | 73 | −20 | 42 | Relegation to NPL Division One South |
| 21 | Leigh Genesis (R) | 42 | 11 | 7 | 24 | 42 | 88 | −46 | 40 | Relegation to NPL Division One North |
| 22 | Prescot Cables (R) | 42 | 5 | 12 | 25 | 52 | 107 | −55 | 27 | Relegation to NPL Division One North |

Source: Unibond League.
Rules for classification: 1) points; 2) goal difference; 3) number of goals scored.
(C) Champions; (P) Promoted; (R) Relegated

=== Results ===
| Home \ Away | ASH | BOS | BPA | BUX | CAM | EAS | FCU | FRK | GUI | HED | ILK | KEN | LEG | MAR | MAT | NAN | NFU | OST | PRC | WTB | WTN | WKS |
|---|---|---|---|---|---|---|---|---|---|---|---|---|---|---|---|---|---|---|---|---|---|---|
| Ashton United | | 3–0 | 2–1 | 4–1 | 1–1 | 2–2 | 2–1 | 0–2 | 2–2 | 1–0 | 1–1 | 1–2 | 2–0 | 2–0 | 3–2 | 0–1 | 1–1 | 2–1 | 2–2 | 3–3 | 5–1 | 6–2 |
| Boston United | 0–1 | | 1–2 | 1–1 | 1–0 | 0–1 | 0–1 | 2–3 | 2–2 | 1–2 | 0–0 | 1–0 | 1–1 | 2–1 | 0–2 | 0–5 | 0–2 | 3–2 | 5–0 | 2–0 | 0–0 | 0–1 |
| Bradford Park Avenue | 6–4 | 1–1 | | 1–0 | 1–2 | 0–2 | 2–0 | 1–0 | 2–2 | 3–0 | 0–1 | 2–2 | 2–1 | 2–0 | 3–2 | 0–0 | 3–1 | 2–0 | 4–0 | 3–2 | 0–2 | 1–1 |
| Buxton | 1–2 | 0–1 | 1–1 | | 3–0 | 0–0 | 0–1 | 1–1 | 2–1 | 0–3 | 0–2 | 2–2 | 0–0 | 0–2 | 4–1 | 0–2 | 2–1 | 0–0 | 2–2 | 3–0 | 2–1 | 2–0 |
| Cammell Laird | 1–2 | 0–0 | 1–2 | 0–1 | | 1–0 | 2–1 | 2–0 | 5–4 | 1–1 | 0–1 | 2–3 | 2–1 | 3–2 | 2–2 | 0–1 | 1–7 | 0–1 | 1–1 | 2–2 | 1–2 | 2–1 |
| Eastwood Town | 2–1 | 1–0 | 1–1 | 2–1 | 4–1 | | 4–2 | 4–2 | 1–3 | 2–1 | 2–2 | 1–1 | 2–0 | 4–0 | 1–0 | 3–1 | 5–0 | 2–0 | 1–1 | 1–1 | 2–1 | 4–0 |
| F.C. United of Manchester | 4–0 | 0–1 | 1–1 | 1–1 | 5–5 | 0–1 | | 2–0 | 2–1 | 3–0 | 3–1 | 1–3 | 2–4 | 3–2 | 3–3 | 0–0 | 4–0 | 3–2 | 2–0 | 3–1 | 5–3 | 0–0 |
| Frickley Athletic | 3–0 | 0–0 | 3–4 | 1–0 | 1–1 | 0–0 | 1–3 | | 2–2 | 0–0 | 1–1 | 2–1 | 0–0 | 0–0 | 3–1 | 0–4 | 0–0 | 2–2 | 3–1 | 1–0 | 2–0 | 0–3 |
| Guiseley | 3–1 | 3–1 | 1–3 | 1–3 | 2–0 | 2–1 | 2–2 | 2–3 | | 1–2 | 1–1 | 3–2 | 3–1 | 4–0 | 1–1 | 2–2 | 2–0 | 0–1 | 4–0 | 1–3 | 2–0 | 6–0 |
| Hednesford Town | 2–1 | 0–1 | 3–1 | 2–1 | 4–1 | 0–1 | 2–2 | 1–0 | 2–2 | | 0–1 | 3–3 | 1–2 | 1–2 | 4–0 | 2–0 | 0–2 | 0–3 | 4–1 | 1–3 | 2–0 | 5–0 |
| Ilkeston Town | 2–1 | 1–1 | 0–0 | 1–0 | 2–1 | 1–0 | 0–1 | 1–0 | 0–1 | 0–1 | | 1–1 | 3–1 | 5–0 | 2–2 | 3–2 | 1–0 | 2–1 | 3–0 | 1–0 | 3–1 | 3–3 |
| Kendal Town | 5–1 | 3–0 | 5–0 | 3–2 | 4–2 | 2–0 | 1–2 | 1–1 | 1–4 | 4–1 | 1–1 | | 2–0 | 1–2 | 2–2 | 1–3 | 3–2 | 2–3 | 5–1 | 3–3 | 1–0 | 0–0 |
| Leigh Genesis | 3–0 | 0–0 | 2–1 | 0–7 | 2–1 | 0–4 | 0–2 | 2–0 | 2–4 | 1–3 | 1–2 | 1–2 | | 0–0 | 0–2 | 0–8 | 0–3 | 0–6 | 2–1 | 2–4 | 0–2 | 1–2 |
| Marine | 1–1 | 3–1 | 0–4 | 2–0 | 0–0 | 1–2 | 2–3 | 1–2 | 2–0 | 0–3 | 0–2 | 0–1 | 0–1 | | 2–1 | 0–0 | 1–0 | 2–1 | 3–6 | 2–2 | 0–2 | 6–2 |
| Matlock Town | 2–1 | 0–2 | 0–4 | 0–2 | 2–0 | 1–1 | 2–1 | 1–2 | 2–2 | 2–0 | 1–1 | 0–0 | 5–0 | 4–0 | | 2–3 | 3–2 | 1–3 | 2–2 | 2–0 | 1–0 | 2–2 |
| Nantwich Town | 3–1 | 5–0 | 1–0 | 3–2 | 0–1 | 2–2 | 3–0 | 2–2 | 0–2 | 1–3 | 0–1 | 4–0 | 1–1 | 0–3 | 1–1 | | 4–0 | 2–0 | 3–2 | 3–1 | 2–0 | 3–1 |
| North Ferriby United | 1–2 | 0–2 | 2–2 | 4–2 | 2–0 | 2–2 | 0–2 | 4–1 | 1–2 | 2–1 | 0–0 | 1–2 | 1–2 | 1–2 | 6–3 | 1–1 | | 4–1 | 5–0 | 1–0 | 1–2 | 5–0 |
| Ossett Town | 3–1 | 0–0 | 1–2 | 1–1 | 2–2 | 0–3 | 0–4 | 2–0 | 1–4 | 1–1 | 1–3 | 5–1 | 0–2 | 4–5 | 3–2 | 2–1 | 0–1 | | 1–1 | 6–2 | 4–2 | 1–0 |
| Prescot Cables | 1–1 | 2–2 | 1–1 | 2–0 | 1–4 | 1–5 | 4–3 | 0–2 | 3–6 | 0–5 | 0–2 | 0–1 | 2–0 | 1–2 | 2–2 | 2–0 | 1–2 | 2–3 | | 2–4 | 1–3 | 0–1 |
| Whitby Town | 1–2 | 1–0 | 1–0 | 0–2 | 0–3 | 1–1 | 0–0 | 2–2 | 0–2 | 0–3 | 3–0 | 2–3 | 2–2 | 2–0 | 2–0 | 0–0 | 1–2 | 5–2 | 3–0 | | 1–0 | 0–2 |
| Witton Albion | 4–2 | 1–2 | 1–4 | 4–1 | 2–3 | 1–2 | 2–1 | 1–1 | 1–2 | 0–2 | 2–0 | 1–3 | 1–3 | 1–3 | 2–0 | 0–2 | 2–1 | 1–1 | 0–0 | 0–0 | | 2–3 |
| Worksop Town | 1–1 | 1–1 | 1–1 | 2–3 | 1–1 | 1–1 | 0–3 | 3–1 | 0–4 | 2–7 | 0–1 | 0–2 | 2–1 | 1–0 | 0–1 | 0–4 | 2–1 | 1–0 | 3–3 | 1–0 | 2–2 | |

Updated to match(es) played on 25 April 2009. Source: Northern Premier Division results grid
Legend: Blue = home team win; Yellow = draw; Red = away team win.

=== Play-offs ===
Semifinals
3 | Nantwich Town | 2
4 | Guiseley | 1
2 | Ilkeston Town | 4
5 | Kendal Town | 3

Final
2 | Ilkeston Town | 2
3 | Nantwich Town | 1

=== Stadia and Locations ===
Locations of the 2008–09 Northern Premier League teams

| Team | Stadium | Capacity |
|---|---|---|
| F.C. United of Manchester | Gigg Lane (Bury ground share) | 11,840 |
| Leigh Genesis | Leigh Sports Village Stadium | 10,000 |
| Boston United | York Street | 6,643 |
| Buxton | The Silverlands | 5,200 |
| Bradford Park Avenue | Horsfall Stadium | 5,000 |
| Worksop Town | Watnall Road (Hucknall ground share) | 5,000 |
| Ashton United | Hurst Cross | 4,500 |
| Ilkeston Town | New Manor Ground | 3,500 |
| Nantwich Town | The Weaver Stadium | 3,500 |
| Whitby Town | Turnbull Ground | 3,500 |
| Prescot Cables | Valerie Park | 3,200 |
| Burscough | Victoria Park | 3,054 |
| Guiseley | Nethermoor Park | 3,000 |
| Marine | The Arriva Stadium | 2,800 |
| North Ferriby United | Grange Lane | 2,700 |
| Eastwood Town | Coronation Park | 2,500 |
| Kendal Town | Lakeland Radio Stadium | 2,400 |
| Matlock Town | Causeway Lane | 2,214 |
| Frickley Athletic | Westfield Lane | 2,087 |
| Ossett Town | Ingfield | 2,000 |
| Cammell Laird | Kirklands Stadium | 1,500 |

== Division One North ==
Northern Premier League Division One North
- Season: 2008–09
- Champions: Durham City
- Promoted: Durham City; Newcastle Blue Star
- Relegated: None
- Matches: 423
- Goals: 1,447 (3.42 per match)

The Division One North features six new clubs:

- FC Halifax Town, relegated from the Conference Premier
- Colwyn Bay, transferred from NPL Division One South
- Warrington Town, transferred from NPL Division One South
- Salford City, promoted from North West Counties League Division One
- Durham City, promoted from Northern League Division One
- Trafford, promoted from North West Counties League Division One

=== League table ===
| Pos | Team | Pld | W | D | L | GF | GA | GD | Pts | Promotion or qualification |
|---|---|---|---|---|---|---|---|---|---|---|
| 1 | Durham City (C, P) | 40 | 25 | 12 | 3 | 98 | 41 | +57 | 87 | Promotion to NPL Premier Division |
| 2 | Skelmersdale United | 40 | 26 | 8 | 6 | 96 | 51 | +45 | 86 | Qualification for Playoffs |
| 3 | Newcastle Blue Star (P) | 40 | 21 | 10 | 9 | 93 | 54 | +39 | 73 | Qualification for Playoffs |
| 4 | Colwyn Bay | 40 | 23 | 7 | 10 | 72 | 49 | +23 | 73 (Note: Colwyn Bay deducted 3 points for fielding an ineligible player) | Qualification for Playoffs |
| 5 | Curzon Ashton | 40 | 20 | 8 | 12 | 66 | 44 | +22 | 68 | Qualification for Playoffs |
| 6 | Ossett Albion | 40 | 19 | 9 | 12 | 76 | 61 | +15 | 66 | |
| 7 | Lancaster City | 40 | 19 | 8 | 13 | 69 | 64 | +5 | 65 | |
| 8 | FC Halifax Town | 40 | 17 | 12 | 11 | 71 | 52 | +19 | 63 | |
| 9 | Wakefield | 40 | 16 | 8 | 16 | 65 | 62 | +3 | 56 | |
| 10 | Mossley | 40 | 16 | 6 | 18 | 63 | 70 | −7 | 54 | |
| 11 | Bamber Bridge | 40 | 16 | 5 | 19 | 69 | 78 | −9 | 53 | |
| 12 | Clitheroe | 40 | 15 | 7 | 18 | 64 | 76 | −12 | 52 | |
| 13 | Woodley Sports | 40 | 16 | 3 | 21 | 57 | 74 | −17 | 51 | |
| 14 | Chorley | 40 | 13 | 8 | 19 | 56 | 66 | −10 | 47 | |
| 15 | Trafford | 40 | 13 | 7 | 20 | 72 | 83 | −11 | 46 | |
| 16 | Garforth Town | 40 | 13 | 5 | 22 | 77 | 99 | −22 | 44 | |
| 17 | Radcliffe Borough | 40 | 12 | 6 | 22 | 51 | 66 | −15 | 42 | |
| 18 | Harrogate Railway Athletic | 40 | 13 | 3 | 24 | 58 | 82 | −24 | 42 | |
| 19 | Warrington Town | 40 | 11 | 8 | 21 | 50 | 73 | −23 | 41 | |
| 20 | Salford City | 40 | 10 | 6 | 24 | 59 | 107 | −48 | 36 | |
| 21 | Rossendale United | 40 | 8 | 10 | 22 | 53 | 83 | −30 | 34 (Note: Rossendale United reprieved from relegation) | |

Source: Unibond League
Rules for classification: 1) points; 2) goal difference; 3) number of goals scored.
(C) Champions; (P) Promoted

=== Results ===
| Home \ Away | BAM | CHO | CLT | COL | CZA | DUR | GAR | HAL | HRA | LNC | MOS | NBS | OSA | RAD | ROS | SLC | SKU | TRA | WAK | WAR | WDL |
|---|---|---|---|---|---|---|---|---|---|---|---|---|---|---|---|---|---|---|---|---|---|
| Bamber Bridge | | 1–1 | 0–5 | 2–5 | 1–0 | 0–5 | 1–3 | 2–5 | 2–3 | 2–3 | 0–2 | 1–4 | 1–4 | 3–0 | 3–1 | 4–1 | 0–0 | 2–0 | 2–0 | 3–3 | 2–1 |
| Chorley | 3–1 | | 0–2 | 2–3 | 0–1 | 1–3 | 4–1 | 0–0 | 2–2 | 1–2 | 1–1 | 1–0 | 2–4 | 2–0 | 3–2 | 2–2 | 4–1 | 1–1 | 1–3 | 1–3 | 2–3 |
| Clitheroe | 3–3 | 1–1 | | 3–0 | 1–0 | 1–3 | 3–1 | 1–2 | 4–3 | 0–5 | 0–2 | 3–3 | 4–2 | 1–2 | 3–2 | 4–1 | 0–6 | 2–2 | 3–0 | 3–2 | 2–3 |
| Colwyn Bay | 0–1 | 2–1 | 3–0 | | 1–1 | 0–2 | 2–1 | 3–1 | 3–2 | 4–1 | 6–1 | 4–1 | 4–0 | 1–0 | 1–0 | 1–1 | 1–2 | 0–1 | 3–2 | 3–1 | 1–1 |
| Curzon Ashton | 0–1 | 4–1 | 0–1 | 0–1 | | 1–0 | 1–0 | 0–1 | 3–1 | 1–1 | 0–1 | 2–1 | 2–0 | 3–1 | 4–1 | 2–1 | 0–4 | 3–3 | 2–1 | 1–3 | 3–0 |
| Durham City | 3–2 | 3–1 | 3–1 | 0–0 | 2–2 | | 5–2 | 1–1 | 1–0 | 6–0 | 6–1 | 2–2 | 3–0 | 4–2 | 4–0 | 2–1 | 0–0 | 2–0 | 1–0 | 4–1 | 5–0 |
| Garforth Town | 3–4 | 1–0 | 3–4 | 2–3 | 3–2 | 0–3 | | 2–2 | 4–1 | 3–1 | 3–1 | 2–3 | 2–4 | 1–4 | 2–3 | 2–5 | 3–6 | 2–1 | 1–0 | 1–1 | 3–1 |
| FC Halifax Town | 0–3 | 3–1 | 4–0 | 1–1 | 1–2 | 0–0 | 5–1 | | 2–1 | 0–0 | 2–0 | 3–3 | 1–1 | 1–1 | 1–2 | 7–1 | 3–0 | 2–2 | 3–2 | 1–0 | 0–1 |
| Harrogate Railway Athletic | 1–5 | 0–1 | 1–0 | 0–1 | 1–3 | 2–1 | 2–1 | 2–0 | | 2–3 | 1–2 | 1–2 | 0–5 | 2–1 | 1–0 | 1–3 | 2–4 | 4–2 | 0–1 | 2–3 | 2–1 |
| Lancaster City | 1–0 | 1–0 | 1–0 | 1–3 | 0–1 | 3–3 | 3–1 | 2–0 | 1–2 | | 0–0 | 1–4 | 3–2 | 0–1 | 1–0 | 3–5 | 2–5 | 3–0 | 1–1 | 2–3 | 3–2 |
| Mossley | 2–2 | 0–1 | 1–0 | 1–3 | 0–2 | 1–3 | 3–4 | 3–1 | 1–1 | 1–1 | | 0–5 | 5–3 | 0–2 | 3–0 | 2–3 | 0–1 | 3–1 | 1–2 | 4–1 | 3–2 |
| Newcastle Blue Star | 0–2 | 0–0 | 1–1 | 1–1 | 0–1 | 2–2 | 6–1 | 3–0 | 5–0 | 1–2 | 1–1 | | 4–2 | 2–1 | 5–0 | 2–0 | 0–4 | 1–3 | 1–0 | 3–1 | 2–2 |
| Ossett Albion | 1–0 | 1–2 | 1–2 | 2–0 | 1–1 | 0–1 | 2–1 | 2–2 | 2–0 | 2–1 | 3–0 | 2–1 | | 2–1 | 3–1 | 3–1 | 1–1 | 2–3 | 1–1 | 2–1 | 4–3 |
| Radcliffe Borough | 3–2 | 1–2 | 0–1 | 2–2 | 1–4 | 4–2 | 0–2 | 1–4 | 1–0 | 1–1 | 1–0 | 0–3 | 0–2 | | 1–3 | 6–0 | 1–1 | 1–2 | 0–2 | 0–1 | 0–2 |
| Rossendale United | 2–3 | 0–1 | 2–2 | 0–1 | 3–0 | 1–1 | 2–2 | 1–0 | 2–2 | 1–1 | 0–3 | 1–4 | 1–1 | 0–2 | | 4–5 | 2–3 | 2–2 | 3–0 | 3–2 | 0–1 |
| Salford City | 1–0 | 1–6 | 1–1 | 1–3 | 1–1 | 0–1 | 0–4 | 0–1 | 2–0 | 0–4 | 0–4 | 1–2 | 1–1 | 2–2 | 3–1 | | 0–1 | 2–6 | 1–2 | 3–1 | 2–3 |
| Skelmersdale United | 3–2 | 2–1 | 3–0 | 3–0 | 3–1 | 1–1 | 3–3 | 2–1 | 2–4 | 1–3 | 4–2 | 1–2 | 2–0 | 2–1 | 2–2 | 4–1 | | 2–0 | 2–0 | 1–1 | 2–1 |
| Trafford | 1–2 | 5–0 | 4–0 | 6–1 | 0–5 | 3–3 | 0–5 | 1–2 | 1–0 | 2–3 | 3–1 | 2–4 | 0–2 | 1–0 | 2–4 | 5–2 | 2–4 | | 1–3 | 0–1 | 0–2 |
| Wakefield | 3–1 | 3–0 | 3–2 | 1–0 | 2–2 | 1–1 | 3–1 | 1–4 | 3–6 | 1–2 | 0–2 | 1–1 | 2–2 | 1–1 | 2–2 | 8–1 | 2–1 | 0–1 | | 1–0 | 2–1 |
| Warrington Town | 0–3 | 1–3 | 1–0 | 0–1 | 2–2 | 1–2 | 5–0 | 1–1 | 0–2 | 0–2 | 0–1 | 0–4 | 1–1 | 2–4 | 1–1 | 1–0 | 0–4 | 2–2 | 2–1 | | 1–0 |
| Woodley Sports | 2–0 | 1–0 | 1–0 | 1–0 | 0–3 | 3–4 | 0–0 | 2–3 | 2–1 | 2–1 | 1–4 | 2–4 | 0–3 | 0–1 | 2–0 | 0–3 | 2–3 | 3–1 | 2–4 | 1–0 | |

Updated to match(es) played on 25 April 2009. Source: Northern Premier League First Division North results grid
Legend: Blue = home team win; Yellow = draw; Red = away team win.

=== Play-offs ===
Semifinals
3 | Newcastle Blue Star | 2(4)
4 | Colwyn Bay | 2(2)
2 | Skelmersdale United | 0
5 | Curzon Ashton | 1

Final
3 | Newcastle Blue Star | 4
5 | Curzon Ashton | 1

== Division One South ==
Northern Premier League Division One South
- Season: 2008–09
- Champions: Retford United
- Promoted: Retford United; Stocksbridge Park Steels
- Relegated: Gresley Rovers
- Matches: 383
- Goals: 1,243 (3.25 per match)

The Division One South features seven new clubs:

- Leek Town, relegated from the NPL Premier Division
- Stamford, relegated from the NPL Premier Division
- Lincoln United, relegated from the NPL Premier Division
- Rushall Olympic, moved from the Southern League Division One Midlands
- Willenhall Town, moved from the Southern League Division One Midlands
- Glapwell, promoted from the Northern Counties East League Premier Division
- Loughborough Dynamo, promoted from the Midland Football Alliance

=== League table ===
| Pos | Team | Pld | W | D | L | GF | GA | GD | Pts | Promotion or qualification |
|---|---|---|---|---|---|---|---|---|---|---|
| 1 | Retford United (C, P) | 38 | 24 | 9 | 5 | 88 | 34 | +54 | 81 | Promotion to NPL Premier Division |
| 2 | Belper Town | 38 | 24 | 9 | 5 | 79 | 41 | +38 | 81 | Qualification for Playoffs |
| 3 | Stocksbridge Park Steels (P) | 38 | 23 | 6 | 9 | 92 | 44 | +48 | 75 | Qualification for Playoffs |
| 4 | Carlton Town | 38 | 20 | 10 | 8 | 83 | 50 | +33 | 70 | Qualification for Playoffs |
| 5 | Rushall Olympic | 38 | 20 | 8 | 10 | 63 | 42 | +21 | 68 | Qualification for Playoffs |
| 6 | Glapwell | 38 | 21 | 5 | 12 | 78 | 58 | +20 | 68 | |
| 7 | Stamford | 38 | 15 | 16 | 7 | 65 | 51 | +14 | 61 | |
| 8 | Shepshed Dynamo | 38 | 16 | 8 | 14 | 61 | 61 | 0 | 56 | |
| 9 | Leek Town | 38 | 14 | 12 | 12 | 63 | 60 | +3 | 54 | |
| 10 | Lincoln United | 38 | 14 | 9 | 15 | 58 | 65 | −7 | 51 | |
| 11 | Sheffield | 38 | 14 | 8 | 16 | 67 | 69 | −2 | 50 | |
| 12 | Quorn | 38 | 13 | 9 | 16 | 54 | 63 | −9 | 48 | |
| 13 | Grantham Town | 38 | 12 | 11 | 15 | 49 | 65 | −16 | 47 | |
| 14 | Loughborough Dynamo | 38 | 11 | 13 | 14 | 45 | 58 | −13 | 46 | |
| 15 | Kidsgrove Athletic | 38 | 12 | 5 | 21 | 49 | 62 | −13 | 41 | |
| 16 | Willenhall Town | 38 | 10 | 8 | 20 | 55 | 74 | −19 | 38 | |
| 17 | Spalding United | 38 | 10 | 7 | 21 | 41 | 82 | −41 | 37 | |
| 18 | Goole | 38 | 13 | 5 | 20 | 62 | 85 | −23 | 33 (Note: Goole deducted 1 point for fielding an ineligible player and 10 points for entering into administration) | |
| 19 | Gresley Rovers | 38 | 6 | 7 | 25 | 41 | 78 | −37 | 25 (Note: Gresley Rovers resigned from the league. Brigg Town reprieved) | Club folded, reformed as Gresley in EMCFL |
| 20 | Brigg Town | 38 | 3 | 5 | 30 | 41 | 92 | −51 | 14 | |

Source: Unibond League
Rules for classification: 1) points; 2) goal difference; 3) number of goals scored.
(C) Champions; (P) Promoted

=== Results ===
| Home \ Away | BLP | BRG | CAR | GLP | GOO | GRN | GRE | KID | LEE | LIN | LOU | QON | RET | RSO | SHE | SPD | SPA | STM | STO | WIL |
|---|---|---|---|---|---|---|---|---|---|---|---|---|---|---|---|---|---|---|---|---|
| Belper Town | | 2–1 | 1–0 | 3–1 | 2–0 | 2–0 | 4–0 | 3–1 | 4–1 | 1–2 | 2–1 | 2–0 | 1–1 | 2–2 | 3–0 | 4–1 | 0–0 | 2–2 | 4–2 | 3–1 |
| Brigg Town | 1–2 | | 2–3 | 0–2 | 0–2 | 1–1 | 1–2 | 0–1 | 0–2 | 2–2 | 0–2 | 2–3 | 2–4 | 3–3 | 2–0 | 1–2 | 1–2 | 1–3 | 1–3 | 1–2 |
| Carlton Town | 5–1 | 5–0 | | 2–1 | 4–2 | 5–1 | 2–0 | 2–1 | 6–2 | 0–1 | 2–0 | 2–4 | 1–3 | 1–2 | 3–3 | 1–2 | 3–0 | 3–3 | 0–2 | 3–2 |
| Glapwell | 4–0 | 3–2 | 0–0 | | 6–2 | 2–1 | 3–1 | 3–0 | 1–3 | 3–2 | 1–0 | 3–1 | 0–1 | 3–1 | 2–5 | 4–2 | 2–0 | 2–1 | 0–1 | 3–0 |
| Goole | 0–5 | 4–3 | 2–1 | 1–1 | | 1–4 | 3–1 | 0–1 | 1–2 | 3–3 | 2–1 | 2–3 | 1–2 | 1–2 | 2–1 | 3–2 | 1–2 | 1–3 | 0–3 | 5–1 |
| Grantham Town | 1–1 | 3–0 | 0–3 | 0–5 | 0–0 | | 2–0 | 2–1 | 2–0 | 1–3 | 0–0 | 1–1 | 0–0 | 1–0 | 1–1 | 4–2 | 0–0 | 3–3 | 1–2 | 1–2 |
| Gresley | 0–1 | 1–2 | 0–2 | 1–2 | 1–3 | 1–3 | | 3–3 | 1–1 | 1–2 | 1–1 | 1–2 | 0–4 | 0–3 | 2–5 | 0–1 | 5–0 | 3–2 | 0–2 | 2–1 |
| Kidsgrove Athletic | 0–1 | 5–2 | 2–4 | 2–5 | 3–3 | 0–1 | 2–1 | | 1–2 | 2–0 | 1–1 | 2–0 | 2–4 | 3–0 | 0–2 | 1–0 | 0–1 | 1–2 | 0–1 | 0–2 |
| Leek Town | 1–1 | 3–0 | 2–2 | 6–0 | 3–1 | 0–2 | 2–2 | 1–0 | | 3–1 | 1–1 | 1–0 | 1–2 | 6–2 | 2–2 | 3–4 | 0–0 | 3–4 | 2–2 | 4–3 |
| Lincoln United | 2–3 | 1–1 | 1–4 | 5–0 | 1–2 | 1–0 | 1–1 | 1–4 | 1–0 | | 1–1 | 0–1 | 0–3 | 1–4 | 1–0 | 0–2 | 0–4 | 3–5 | 3–2 | 3–4 |
| Loughborough Dynamo | 0–4 | 1–1 | 0–1 | 2–1 | 2–1 | 4–0 | 2–0 | 2–1 | 2–2 | 1–1 | | 1–1 | 1–4 | 1–1 | 2–1 | 1–5 | 0–2 | 1–2 | 0–2 | 0–1 |
| Quorn | 1–1 | 4–0 | 2–0 | 1–1 | 3–1 | 3–2 | 2–1 | 0–2 | 2–2 | 0–2 | 1–3 | | 0–3 | 1–4 | 1–3 | 3–5 | 3–1 | 4–1 | 1–3 | 2–3 |
| Retford United | 2–3 | 3–0 | 1–2 | 3–3 | 5–0 | 0–0 | 0–1 | 4–1 | 3–2 | 3–1 | 3–0 | 2–2 | | 2–1 | 3–0 | 4–3 | 5–0 | 1–1 | 2–1 | 2–0 |
| Rushall Olympic | 1–1 | 3–1 | 0–1 | 2–0 | 0–1 | 2–3 | 3–1 | 4–2 | 2–0 | 0–0 | 2–2 | 1–0 | 1–3 | | 3–2 | 1–0 | 2–0 | 2–0 | 3–1 | 2–2 |
| Sheffield | 1–1 | 0–2 | 2–2 | 0–4 | 2–0 | 2–0 | 1–4 | 1–0 | 1–2 | 3–2 | 2–3 | 3–1 | 3–2 | 1–3 | | 0–2 | 7–0 | 3–1 | 3–5 | 2–1 |
| Shepshed Dynamo | 3–0 | 2–0 | 0–3 | 1–1 | 4–2 | 1–1 | 2–0 | 2–0 | 0–1 | 0–3 | 1–2 | 2–0 | 1–3 | 1–0 | 1–1 | | 3–2 | 1–1 | 2–0 | 1–1 |
| Spalding United | 0–4 | 3–2 | 1–2 | 1–2 | 1–4 | 5–1 | 1–1 | 0–1 | 1–2 | 0–1 | 3–5 | 1–1 | 0–5 | 1–0 | 2–1 | 1–2 | | 0–1 | 1–3 | 2–2 |
| Stamford | 1–2 | 2–1 | 2–2 | 3–1 | 4–1 | 2–1 | 1–0 | 7–0 | 2–1 | 1–1 | 3–0 | 1–1 | 0–1 | 0–1 | 2–2 | 0–0 | 1–1 | | 2–2 | 2–0 |
| Stocksbridge Park Steels | 1–0 | 5–1 | 2–2 | 3–0 | 2–3 | 7–1 | 4–0 | 3–1 | 4–1 | 1–3 | 4–1 | 2–0 | 1–0 | 0–1 | 1–1 | 3–0 | 8–0 | 1–1 | | 4–1 |
| Willenhall Town | 1–3 | 2–1 | 2–2 | 1–4 | 1–1 | 2–4 | 2–2 | 1–2 | 0–2 | 2–3 | 2–0 | 0–1 | 8–0 | 0–1 | 1–2 | 6–1 | 1–2 | 0–2 | 2–1 | |

Updated to match(es) played on 25 April 2009. Source: Northern Premier League First Division South results grid
Legend: Blue = home team win; Yellow = draw; Red = away team win.

=== Play-offs ===
Semifinals
3 | Stocksbridge Park Steels | 5
4 | Carlton Town | 2
2 | Belper Town | 1
5 | Rushall Olympic | 0

Final
3 | Stocksbridge Park Steels | 1
2 | Belper Town | 0

== Cup Results ==
Challenge Cup: Teams from all 3 divisions.

- Guiseley 3–2 AET Ilkeston Town

President's Cup: Teams from lower 2 divisions.

- Trafford 2–0 Quorn

Chairman's Cup: Between Champions of NPL Division 1 North and NPL Division 1 South.

- Durham City 2–1 Retford United

== Peter Swales Shield ==
2009 Peter Swales Shield
| Eastwood Town | Durham City |
| 2 | 1 |
- Date: 2 May 2009
- Venue: Coronation Park, Eastwood
- Referee: James Hermuzi
- Attendance: 202

The 2009 version of the Peter Swales Shield saw the champions of the 2008–09 NPL Premier Division, Eastwood Town, play against the winners of the 2009 NPL Chairman's Cup, Durham City. Eastwood Town won the match 2–1.

| 2 May 2009 | Eastwood Town (2008–09 NPL Premier Division Winners) | 2–1 | Durham City (2009 NPL Chairman's Cup Winners) | Coronation Park, Eastwood |
| 15:00 | Todd 42' (pen.); Rhead 70' | Eastwood Town Report | Moffatt 90' | Attendance: 202; Referee: James Hermuzi |
