= 2007–08 Northern Premier League =

The 2007–08 is the 40th season for the Northern Premier League Premier Division, and the first season for the Northern Premier League Division One North and South.

Created as part of non-league restructuring, the Division One leagues temporarily have 18 teams each, with a targeted number of 22 teams. To help increase the league to 20 teams for next season there will only be one relegation this year per league. Many clubs expressed their concern that a 34-game season would be too short. To remedy this, clubs will play an extra 8 games (4 home, 4 away) against teams within geographically related groups.

== Premier Division ==
Northern Premier League Premier Division
- Season: 2007–08
- Champions: Fleetwood Town
- Promoted: Fleetwood Town; Gateshead
- Relegated: Leek Town; Stamford; Lincoln United
- Matches: 423
- Goals: 1,310 (3.1 per match)

The Premier Division featured four new clubs:

- Buxton, promoted as champions from NPL Division One
- Eastwood Town, promoted via play-offs from NPL Division One
- Stamford, transferred from the Southern League Premier Division
- Worksop Town, relegated from the Conference North

=== League table ===
Pos	Team	Pld	W	D	L	GF	GA	GD	Pts	Promotion or relegation
1	Fleetwood Town (C, P)	40	28	7	5	81	39	+42	91	Promotion to Conference North
2	Witton Albion	40	27	8	5	84	28	+56	89	Qualification for Playoffs
3	Gateshead (P)	40	26	7	7	93	42	+51	85	Qualification for Playoffs
4	Eastwood Town	40	20	9	11	61	45	+16	69	Qualification for Playoffs
5	Buxton	40	20	8	12	60	50	+10	68	Qualification for Playoffs
6	Guiseley	40	19	10	11	65	43	+22	67	
7	Marine	40	19	4	17	70	65	+5	61	
8	Hednesford Town	40	15	8	17	62	65	−3	53	
9	Worksop Town	40	13	12	15	59	62	−3	51	
10	Ashton United	40	11	15	14	63	73	−10	48	
11	Kendal Town	40	12	11	17	61	70	−9	47	
12	Whitby Town	40	13	7	20	68	75	−7	46	
13	Prescot Cables	40	13	8	19	48	62	−14	46 (Note: Deducted 1 points for fielding an ineligible player)	
14	Frickley Athletic	40	11	13	16	50	68	−18	46	
15	North Ferriby United	40	13	7	20	53	76	−23	46	
16	Matlock Town	40	12	9	19	55	68	−13	45	
17	Ilkeston Town	40	10	14	16	64	72	−8	44	
18	Ossett Town	40	12	8	20	48	60	−12	44	
19	Leek Town (R)	40	11	11	18	54	68	−14	44	Relegation to NPL Division One South
20	Stamford (R)	40	11	10	19	59	86	−27	43	Relegation to NPL Division One South
21	Lincoln United (R)	40	7	8	25	44	85	−41	29	Relegation to NPL Division One South

Updated to match(es) played on 30 Apr 2008. Source: Unibond League
Rules for classification: 1) points; 2) goal difference; 3) number of goals scored.
(C) Champions; (P) Promoted; (R) Relegated

=== Results ===
Home \ Away	ASH	BUX	EAS	FLE	FRK	GAT	GUI	HED	ILK	KEN	LEE	LIN	MAR	MAT	NFU	OST	PRC	STM	WTB	WTN	WKS
Ashton United		2–2	1–0	3–5	7–2	0–1	0–0	2–1	0–0	2–2	1–5	1–2	1–3	2–1	3–1	1–1	2–2	1–1	0–0	1–2	1–0
Buxton	3–1		1–1	0–2	4–0	0–4	2–0	0–2	3–1	0–1	1–0	5–1	2–2	5–1	0–2	3–1	2–1	2–3	1–1	0–2	2–1
Eastwood Town	5–2	0–2		2–1	2–2	1–3	3–2	2–2	0–0	2–0	1–0	3–0	1–0	2–3	2–0	3–2	2–1	3–2	4–1	1–0	1–1
Fleetwood Town	3–0	2–1	1–1		1–1	2–3	2–2	2–1	2–1	3–2	6–3	1–0	2–3	3–0	2–1	3–1	2–0	3–2	1–0	0–0	2–1
Frickley Athletic	4–2	0–0	0–0	0–1		3–4	1–0	4–0	2–1	2–1	0–1	3–1	1–1	0–0	2–2	2–3	1–0	1–1	0–2	0–1	3–1
Gateshead	1–1	5–0	1–1	2–0	5–2		1–0	6–2	1–2	3–0	2–0	2–0	1–2	2–0	3–1	1–0	3–0	2–1	2–1	0–2	0–1
Guiseley	3–1	1–2	1–0	0–2	1–1	1–2		1–1	0–1	2–1	2–0	1–1	3–1	3–1	2–1	2–0	1–1	0–0	4–1	1–1	0–3
Hednesford Town	0–2	1–3	0–3	0–3	3–0	3–2	2–5		2–0	1–3	2–0	2–2	1–1	3–1	0–1	3–1	2–1	6–1	0–0	2–2	3–1
Ilkeston Town	3–3	1–2	4–0	3–3	3–1	2–0	2–2	0–0		2–3	0–1	4–5	2–4	3–2	2–4	0–2	1–1	2–1	3–0	0–2	3–3
Kendal Town	2–2	1–1	1–1	1–1	1–0	1–5	2–2	1–3	2–2		1–2	3–1	6–0	2–1	0–1	1–1	3–1	4–0	3–2	0–2	1–1
Leek Town	1–1	0–2	1–3	1–2	0–1	2–2	1–0	2–1	1–1	5–0		1–1	0–4	0–0	2–2	1–0	0–1	2–3	3–3	2–2	2–1
Lincoln United	2–4	1–1	1–2	0–3	0–0	3–3	0–2	0–2	0–2	2–0	3–4		0–2	0–2	2–3	0–2	2–3	0–1	0–2	1–0	1–1
Marine	1–2	0–1	2–0	0–1	2–3	1–5	0–2	2–1	5–3	4–1	3–0	3–1		3–1	3–0	0–1	1–0	3–2	3–2	0–2	1–2
Matlock Town	2–3	3–0	1–0	0–0	2–2	1–1	0–1	1–1	1–1	4–2	2–2	2–1	2–3		2–1	0–1	3–1	3–1	2–1	0–2	3–0
North Ferriby United	1–1	1–0	1–0	1–2	3–1	1–4	0–5	2–0	1–2	1–3	1–1	0–1	2–1	3–2		2–1	0–4	2–3	1–4	1–1	2–4
Ossett Town	0–0	0–1	0–2	0–1	0–1	0–3	1–5	0–1	1–1	2–1	1–3	3–2	2–3	3–1	0–0		3–0	0–1	4–2	0–0	1–0
Prescot Cables	1–0	0–1	1–0	1–3	1–1	0–2	0–1	2–5	1–1	2–1	3–1	1–2	1–1	1–2	1–0	1–1		2–1	1–0	1–0	0–1
Stamford	1–1	0–1	0–3	0–3	4–2	1–1	2–3	0–2	5–4	1–1	2–2	2–2	2–1	2–1	3–1	3–2	0–2		1–3	1–1	0–2
Whitby Town	2–3	1–1	1–2	0–1	3–0	2–1	1–2	1–0	4–0	1–2	2–1	0–3	2–0	3–0	2–3	2–5	3–3	6–3		1–6	4–1
Witton Albion	2–1	3–0	2–0	0–3	3–0	2–2	1–0	3–1	2–1	3–0	3–0	6–0	3–1	2–0	4–2	2–0	6–1	4–0	3–0		0–3
Worksop Town	5–2	1–3	1–2	2–1	1–1	0–4	1–2	2–0	0–0	1–1	2–1	3–0	1–0	2–2	1–1	2–2	1–4	2–2	2–2	1–2	

Updated to match(es) played on 26 April 2008. Source: Northern Premier Division results grid
Legend: Blue = home team win; Yellow = draw; Red = away team win.

=== Play-offs ===
Semifinals
3	Gateshead	4
4	Eastwood Town	0
2	Witton Albion	1(5)
5	Buxton	1(6)

Final
3	Gateshead	2
5	Buxton	0

=== Stadia and Locations ===
Locations of the 2007–08 Northern Premier League teams

Team	Stadium	Capacity
Gateshead	Gateshead International Stadium	11,800
Hednesford Town	Keys Park	6,500
Buxton	The Silverlands	5,200
Ashton United	Hurst Cross	4,500
Fleetwood Town	Highbury Stadium	3,663
Leek Town	Harrison Park	3,600
Ilkeston Town	New Manor Ground	3,500
Whitby Town	Turnbull Ground	3,500
Prescot Cables	Valerie Park	3,200
Worksop Town	Sandy Lane	3,200
Burscough	Victoria Park	3,054
Guiseley	Nethermoor Park	3,000
Marine	The Arriva Stadium	2,800
North Ferriby United	Grange Lane	2,700
Eastwood Town	Coronation Park	2,500
Kendal Town	Lakeland Radio Stadium	2,400
Matlock Town	Causeway Lane	2,214
Lincoln United	Ashby Avenue	2,200
Frickley Athletic	Westfield Lane	2,087
Ossett Town	Ingfield	2,000
Stamford	Vic Couzens Stadium	2,000

== Division One North ==
Northern Premier League Division One North
- Season: 2007–08
- Champions: Bradford Park Avenue
- Promoted: Bradford Park Avenue; F.C. United of Manchester
- Relegated: Bridlington Town
- Matches: 381
- Goals: 1,187 (3.12 per match)

This was the first season of the Northern Premier League Division One North. It Featured six new teams:

- Mossley relegated from the Premier Division
- Radcliffe Borough relegated from the Premier Division
- Garforth Town promoted as fourth in the Northern Counties East League Premier Division
- Newcastle Blue Star promoted from the Northern League Division One
- F.C. United of Manchester promoted as champions of the North West Counties League Division One
- Curzon Ashton promoted as runners-up of the North West Counties League Division One
- Lancaster City as reformed club

=== Fixture increase ===
The following are the groups which decided the extra 8 games for all teams:

Group A	Group B
Bamber Bridge	Bradford Park Avenue
Chorley	Bridlington Town
Clitheroe	Curzon Ashton
F.C. United of Manchester	Garforth Town
Lancaster City	Harrogate Railway Athletic
Radcliffe Borough	Mossley
Rossendale United	Newcastle Blue Star
Skelmersdale United	Ossett Albion
Woodley Sports	Wakefield

=== League table ===
Pos	Team	Pld	W	D	L	GF	GA	GD	Pts	Promotion or relegation
1	Bradford Park Avenue (C, P)	42	25	7	10	91	43	+48	82	Promotion to NPL Premier Division
2	F.C. United of Manchester (P)	42	24	9	9	91	49	+42	81	Qualification for Playoffs
3	Skelmersdale United	42	23	9	10	94	46	+48	78	Qualification for Playoffs
4	Curzon Ashton	42	23	9	10	78	48	+30	78	Qualification for Playoffs
5	Bamber Bridge	42	22	8	12	70	54	+16	74	Qualification for Playoffs
6	Ossett Albion	42	20	10	12	77	65	+12	70	
7	Wakefield	42	19	7	16	58	49	+9	64	
8	Newcastle Blue Star	42	17	12	13	71	58	+13	63	
9	Rossendale United	42	16	11	15	66	74	−8	59	
10	Garforth Town	42	16	8	18	60	63	−3	56	
11	Lancaster City	42	15	9	18	54	70	−16	54	
12	Harrogate Railway Athletic	42	13	12	17	51	58	−7	51	
13	Clitheroe	42	13	11	18	63	77	−14	50	
14	Chorley	42	10	12	20	56	80	−24	42	
15	Mossley	42	12	6	24	60	100	−40	42	
16	Radcliffe Borough	42	9	11	22	53	75	−22	38	
17	Woodley Sports	42	7	13	22	38	65	−27	34	
18	Bridlington Town (R)	42	8	8	26	42	99	−57	32	Relegation to NCEFL Premier Division

Updated to match(es) played on 26 Apr 2008. Source: Unibond League
Rules for classification: 1) points; 2) goal difference; 3) number of goals scored.
(C) Champions; (P) Promoted; (R) Relegated

=== Results ===
Home \ Away	BAM	BPA	BRI	CHO	CLT	CZA	FCU	GAR	HRA	LNC	MOS	NBS	OSA	RAD	ROS	SKU	WAK	WDL
Bamber Bridge		2–1	2–1	4–1; 1–2	2–2	1–1	3–0; 0–0	1–0	0–2	3–1	4–2	1–1	1–2	2–0; 3–0	2–4	0–0; 0–4	0–1	1–0
Bradford Park Avenue	3–2		3–0; 7–0	2–1	1–1	1–2	0–0	1–0; 3–0	1–0	3–0	3–0; 4–1	2–0	3–4; 2–0	2–2	9–0	2–1	3–1	2–0
Bridlington Town	0–2	0–5		2–2	4–0	0–3; 3–3	0–3	0–2	0–0; 0–3	4–0	2–3	3–2; 0–4	1–2	1–2	1–2	0–4	1–3; 0–4	1–0
Chorley	0–1	0–2	2–1		1–1; 2–3	1–1	0–3	1–1	0–0	4–0; 0–1	3–1	1–3	2–2	1–2	1–1; 2–4	0–0	2–1	5–0; 0–0
Clitheroe	0–2; 2–2	0–1	1–0	5–1		2–1	0–3; 2–1	1–2	2–3	1–1	3–2	2–3	1–0	3–2; 1–1	3–3	2–3; 0–0	1–2	1–1
Curzon Ashton	2–0	0–1; 2–0	6–0	1–2	2–2		0–2	4–2; 2–1	1–0	2–1	4–1; 4–2	2–0	2–0; 1–4	1–1	2–0	1–2	1–0	6–1
F.C. United of Manchester	2–2	3–4	6–0	2–1; 3–0	3–0	3–2		0–1	2–0	2–2; 5–2	5–2	3–2	3–1	2–2	5–1; 2–1	3–0	2–1	1–1; 1–1
Garforth Town	0–2	1–4	0–1; 3–0	1–2	1–1	1–0	1–2		0–1; 3–2	1–2	2–1	0–0; 4–0	5–3	2–1	5–2	0–3	2–1; 0–2	0–4
Harrogate Railway Athletic	0–1	2–2; 2–0	3–1	0–3	1–3	2–4; 0–0	1–3	1–3		1–1	1–1; 2–1	1–0	2–1; 1–1	1–2	3–2	1–0	1–1	3–1
Lancaster City	0–2; 3–0	4–3	2–2	1–0	2–0; 0–1	1–2	2–1	1–1	2–0		0–2	1–2	1–3	0–0; 1–5	1–1	2–5; 1–0	1–0	1–0
Mossley	1–2	1–1	2–1; 2–5	4–2	1–3	1–2	2–0	2–2; 2–1	0–4	0–4		2–1; 1–1	3–1	2–2	1–3	4–3	0–2; 0–0	0–3
Newcastle Blue Star	3–0	0–0; 0–0	2–1	5–3	3–1	0–0; 2–1	0–4	1–1	3–0; 2–2	2–2	5–1		3–1; 2–2	1–1	1–0	0–1	2–2	3–1
Ossett Albion	0–5	2–1	1–1; 1–1	2–0	5–1	1–3	3–1	0–2; 4–1	0–0	5–1	4–2; 2–1	1–0		2–3	0–0	1–1	1–1; 1–0	4–3
Radcliffe Borough	2–3	0–2	0–1	2–2; 1–4	3–1	2–3	1–1; 0–2	0–1	2–2	0–4	0–1	3–4	2–3		1–2; 1–0	0–1	0–1	0–1; 1–0
Rossendale United	0–1; 1–5	3–2	1–1	2–2	2–0; 2–2	1–2	1–2	2–2	1–0	2–1; 1–1	1–2	1–0	1–3	2–0		4–1; 2–0	1–3	1–0
Skelmersdale United	4–0	0–1	5–0	5–0; 7–0	3–5	4–1	3–1; 0–0	3–2	1–0	3–1	5–0	2–1	1–1	3–1; 1–2	3–3		3–0	0–0; 2–2
Wakefield	2–0	3–1; 2–3	0–1	0–0	2–1	0–0; 0–1	3–2	0–0	4–1; 2–1	0–1	2–1	2–0; 1–3	0–1	4–2	0–3	1–4		2–0
Woodley Sports	2–2; 2–3	1–0	1–1	2–0	1–0; 1–2	0–0	1–2	0–3	1–1	1–0; 0–0	1–2	1–4	0–2	1–1	0–1; 1–1	1–3	1–2	

Updated to match(es) played on 26 April 2008. Source: Northern Premier League First Division North results grid
Legend: Blue = home team win; Yellow = draw; Red = away team win.

=== Play-offs ===
Semifinals
2	F.C. United of Manchester	3
5	Bamber Bridge	2
3	Skelmersdale United	3
4	Curzon Ashton	0

Final
2	F.C. United of Manchester	4
3	Skelmersdale United	1

== Division One South ==
Northern Premier League Division One South
- Season: 2007–08
- Champions: Retford United
- Promoted: Cammell Laird; Nantwich Town
- Relegated: Alsager Town
- Matches: 381
- Goals: 1,265 (3.32 per match)

This was the first season of the Northern Premier League Division One South. It featured seven new teams:

- Nantwich Town promoted as third in the North West Counties League Division One
- Retford United promoted as champions of the Northern Counties East League Premier Division
- Sheffield promoted as runners-up in the Northern Counties East League Premier Division
- Carlton Town promoted as third in the Northern Counties East League Premier Division
- Quorn promoted as third in the Midland Football Alliance
- Spalding United transferred from the Southern League Division One Midlands
- Grantham Town relegated from the Premier Division

=== Fixture increase ===
The following are the groups which decided the extra 8 games for all teams:

Group C	Group D
Alsager Town	Brigg Town
Belper Town	Carlton Town
Cammell Laird	Goole A.F.C.
Colwyn Bay	Grantham Town
Kidsgrove Athletic	Gresley Rovers
Nantwich Town	Quorn
Sheffield	Retford United
Stocksbridge Park Steels	Shepshed Dynamo
Warrington Town	Spalding United

=== League table ===
Pos	Team	Pld	W	D	L	GF	GA	GD	Pts	Promotion or relegation
1	Retford United (C)	42	31	6	5	93	35	+58	99 (Note: Failed to meet ground grading requirements)	
2	Cammell Laird (P)	42	27	5	10	82	54	+28	86	Promotion to NPL Premier Division
3	Nantwich Town (P)	42	25	4	13	90	45	+45	79	Qualification for Playoffs
4	Sheffield	42	22	10	10	82	53	+29	76	Qualification for Playoffs
5	Stocksbridge Park Steels	42	21	9	12	72	61	+11	72	Qualification for Playoffs
6	Grantham Town	42	22	4	16	74	58	+16	70	Qualification for Playoffs
7	Colwyn Bay	42	19	8	15	86	65	+21	65	Transferred to the NPL Division One North
8	Belper Town	42	17	13	12	73	64	+9	64	
9	Goole	42	18	10	14	77	69	+8	64	
10	Carlton Town	42	16	11	15	86	82	+4	59	
11	Gresley Rovers	42	18	5	19	53	69	−16	59	
12	Quorn	42	15	8	19	69	76	−7	53	
13	Warrington Town	42	13	8	21	51	78	−27	47	Transferred to the NPL Division One North
14	Alsager Town (R)	42	12	7	23	58	88	−30	43	Relegation to NWCFL Premier Division
15	Shepshed Dynamo	42	10	8	24	44	75	−31	38	
16	Brigg Town	42	8	12	22	56	86	−30	36	
17	Kidsgrove Athletic	42	7	10	25	61	90	−29	31	
18	Spalding United	42	3	10	29	46	105	−59	19	

Updated to match(es) played on 26 Apr 2008. Source: Unibond League
Rules for classification: 1) points; 2) goal difference; 3) number of goals scored.
(C) Champions; (P) Promoted; (R) Relegated

=== Results ===
Home \ Away	ALS	BLP	BRG	CAM	CAR	COL	GOO	GRN	GRE	KID	NAN	QON	RET	SHE	SPD	SPA	STO	WAR
Alsager Town		1–3; 1–4	1–4	0–2	1–1	2–3; 1–2	2–0	2–1	0–1	1–1	1–0; 1–2	0–0	1–5	3–3	0–1	5–1	1–1; 2–1	3–2
Belper Town	2–1		4–1	1–3; 2–1	3–2	2–2	1–1	1–1	2–1	3–0; 1–1	3–0	1–4	0–2	1–4; 1–4	2–2	1–1	0–2	6–0; 2–1
Brigg Town	4–4	1–1		2–2	3–4; 1–1	1–3	1–1	1–0; 3–5	0–1	1–3	0–4	1–0; 3–5	0–4	2–2	0–1; 2–2	2–2	0–1	0–2
Cammell Laird	4–2; 2–1	3–2	3–1		4–0	2–0; 2–2	4–1	1–1	2–0	2–0; 2–1	2–0	2–0	1–2	4–1	3–1	1–1	3–1; 2–1	2–0
Carlton Town	0–1	4–1	3–3	2–2		1–0	1–2; 2–1	1–1	3–1; 1–1	3–0	1–5	3–1	2–3; 4–4	4–1	3–2	1–1; 1–2	0–2	3–6
Colwyn Bay	6–2	1–2; 2–2	3–1	3–1	3–4		0–2	1–4	2–1	2–0; 5–2	2–0	1–0	1–1	0–3; 0–0	6–0	4–2	1–3	4–0; 7–1
Goole	3–1	1–1	3–2; 2–3	2–0	0–1	3–4		1–1; 4–0	1–1	6–2	1–0	1–0; 3–0	1–2	1–2	3–0; 4–1	4–3	2–2	2–1
Grantham Town	0–3	3–2	1–2	6–0	1–2; 1–2	2–1	1–0		5–1; 1–2	2–1	2–0	2–0	2–1; 0–1	3–2	1–0	2–4; 1–0	3–1	1–0
Gresley	0–1	1–1	3–2; 0–0	2–1	4–2	1–0	0–1; 3–3	1–4		3–2	0–3	0–2; 3–1	0–1	0–3	3–2; 2–1	1–0	3–1	3–1
Kidsgrove Athletic	1–1; 5–1	1–3	1–3	1–2; 1–2	2–1	1–0	4–0	1–2	1–2		2–2; 2–3	2–2	2–3	4–1	0–0	2–2	3–3; 2–2	0–1
Nantwich Town	6–0	0–1; 4–1	2–0	0–1	1–1	1–1; 3–0	5–1	1–0	3–1	4–1		0–2	1–2; 1–0	3–2	4–2	4–1	3–0	3–0; 1–0
Quorn	3–2	1–1	1–0	1–2	4–2; 2–6	0–2	6–2	0–2; 6–3	4–0	2–0	1–4		0–2; 2–2	0–3	2–0	3–0; 1–1	4–2	0–2
Retford United	5–1	3–0	0–1; 2–0	2–0	2–0	3–1	2–1; 1–3	3–0	2–0; 2–0	4–1	1–2	4–0		2–2	2–0; 1–0	3–2	3–0	2–1
Sheffield	2–1; 3–0	0–0	2–0	4–0; 1–0	3–2	2–0	0–0	2–1	2–0	2–1; 4–1	0–3	0–0	1–1		1–0	7–2; 1–1	4–3	0–1
Shepshed Dynamo	1–0	2–1	1–1; 3–0	2–3	2–2; 2–0	1–1	1–1	0–5; 2–0	1–2	2–0	0–3	2–3; 2–1	1–2	0–2		1–1	2–3	0–1
Spalding United	1–4	1–1	1–1; 0–2	1–2	1–3	2–6	0–2; 2–3	0–1	1–2; 1–2	2–4	1–4	3–3	0–5; 0–1	0–3	0–0		0–2	0–2
Stocksbridge Park Steels	2–0	1–1; 0–3	2–0	2–0	2–2	1–1; 1–0	3–1	1–2	2–1	1–0	1–0; 3–2	4–1	1–0	4–1	3–0	4–2		1–0; 2–2
Warrington Town	0–2; 0–1	0–2	2–2	1–6; 0–1	0–5	2–3	3–3	1–0	1–0	2–1; 2–2	2–2	1–1	0–0	1–1; 2–1	1–2	3–1	3–0	

Updated to match(es) played on 26 April 2008. Source: Northern Premier League First Division South results grid
Legend: Blue = home team win; Yellow = draw; Red = away team win.

=== Play-offs ===
Semifinals
2	Nantwich Town	2
5	Grantham Town	1
3	Sheffield	4
4	Stocksbridge Park Steels	1

Final
2	Nantwich Town	2(4)
3	Sheffield	2(1)

== Cup results ==
Challenge Cup: Teams from all 3 divisions.

- Eastwood Town 3–0 Skelmersdale United

President's Cup: Teams from lower 2 divisions.

- FC United of Manchester 2–0 Radcliffe Borough

Chairman's Cup: Between Champions of NPL Division One North and NPL Division One South.

- Retford United 2–0 Bradford Park Avenue

Peter Swales Shield: Between Champions of NPL Premier Division and Winners of the Chairman's Cup.

- Fleetwood Town 2–1 Bradford Park Avenue^{1}

^{1 Retford United qualified but its ground standards were not high enough for it to play in the shield.}
