= Prescot Cables F.C. =

Association football club in England

Coordinates: 53°25′55″N 2°48′17″W

Prescot Cables
- Full name: Prescot Cables Football Club
- Nickname: Cables
- Founded: 1884; 142 years ago
- Ground: Valerie Park
- Capacity: 2,070
- Chairman: Graham Black
- Manager: Ste Daley
- League: Northern Premier League Division One West
- 2025–26: Northern Premier League Premier Division, 19th of 21 (relegated)
- Website: www.pitchero.com/clubs/prescotcablesfootballclub/
Home colours	Away colours

Prescot Cables Football Club is a supporter-owned football club based in Prescot, Merseyside. It was established in 1884 and has also been known as Prescot and Prescot Town. They compete in the Northern Premier League Division One West and play their home games at Valerie Park. They are a member of the Liverpool County Football Association.

The "Cables" in their name came from the largest local employer in Prescot, British Insulated Cables, which was founded in 1890 as the British Insulated Wire Company, and later became part of British Insulated Callender's Cables. Prescot Wire Works were founder members of the Liverpool County Football Combination league and were runners three times in the years leading up to the First World War.

== History ==
The club's earliest league action came in the Lancashire Alliance, which it joined in 1895–96; after a runner-up finish the following season, it joined the Lancashire Combination in 1897–98, but only lasted one season, failing to be re-elected after finishing second bottom. It had already returned to the Alliance in November 1897, replacing the ailing Hindley, and won the title in 1899–1900 - only to plunge to the bottom in 1900–01, and leave the competition for the Lancashire League.

Prescot only spent the 1901–02 season in the Lancashire League, although it was originally listed as a member for 1902–03 - it did not turn up to the first two matches, amidst rumours of disbandment, and the club was indeed noted as having disbanded in October.

Prescot Cables re-joined the Lancashire Combination in 1927–28, while still simply known as Prescot, taking over the record of Fleetwood who resigned after playing 22 matches, while also finishing its season in the Liverpool County Combination. (Until 1968, when the Northern Premier League was formed, the Lancashire Combination was one of top leagues in the north-west of England). Cables - the name being added in 1928 - was runner-up in the Combination on three consecutive seasons from 1930–31 to 1932–33.

In 1932, Valerie Park hosted its record attendance (8,122) in a game against Ashton National. Unfortunately for the Cables, the glory years were not to return for another 20 years.

The years 1954 to 1960 were probably the club's most successful. In 1954–55, they finished Lancashire Combination Division Two runner-up and were promoted to Division One. The next season but one (1956–57) they finished champions of the Lancashire Combination. The following two seasons they were runners-up.

In 1954–55, the Cables registered their record victory in a competitive game (18–3) against Great Harwood.

In the F.A. Cup, too, the Cables shone. In 1957–58, they fought their way to the first round proper for the first time, only to be beaten away at Hartlepool United. They were in the first round proper again in 1959–60; this time they were beaten away at Darlington.

By 1975, fortunes at the club had dipped drastically. The Cables joined Mid Cheshire Football League and unsurprisingly they finished champions in 1976–77.

In 1978–79, they joined Cheshire County League as founder members of Division Two, finished League Division Two Champions in 1979–80 and won promotion to Division One. This was arguably the highest level of football being played at Valerie Park since 1968. Even better was to follow. In 1982–83, the Cables became founder members of the North West Counties League, and in 1986–87, they won promotion to Division One.

=== Promotion to Northern Premier League ===
In 2001–02, they finished runners-up and the following season they were crowned champions. As a reward, they were promoted to the Northern Premier League Division One.

In the 2004–05 season, they started playing in the Northern Premier League Premier Division, their highest ever flight in football. One of the main reasons for their rapid promotion was that the Football Pyramid underwent major changes in 2004. The Cables finished in 5th place that season following the FA's decision to award them 6 points, thanks to the Spennymoor United failing to fulfil two fixtures against Prescot. The club took duly took their place in the playoffs only to lose 3–1 at Workington.

There was a change in organisation in mid-2005 when a new football committee formed from the Supporters' Club took over the club. Andy Gray took over as manager following the resignation of Tommy Lawson. His side finished in mid-table for the following three seasons.

In the 2007–08 season, the club finished in 13th position out of 21 clubs, although they needed a 3–2 success at Lincoln United to avoid relegation from the Premier Division. The Cables could not avoid the drop the following season, however, finishing in 22nd place. Soon after, manager Andy Gray left the club to take charge at Burscough.

On 21 May 2009, Prescot Cables announced Joe Gibiliru as their new manager. Gibiliru, who was manager of the club in the early 1990s, saw his side end up 15th in Division One North.

After a disappointing start to the 2010–11 season, the club parted company with Gibiliru in November. His assistant Dave Ridler took over as caretaker and was given the job permanently on 23 December 2010, steering the club towards safety.

Ridler left the club in December 2011 to take up a coaching role abroad. He was replaced by Shaun Reid, brother of ex Everton and England international Peter. Reid's reign was short-lived, however, as he moved on to take control of Warrington Town. After a 16th-place finish at the end of the 2011–12 season, former Ashton Athletic manager Dave Powell was appointed as the club's new manager.

In the summer of 2014, Powell was replaced by Neil Prince, who had earlier had a successful spell in charge of Bootle.

In August 2015, Cables parted company with Neil Prince after only three games of the 2015/16 season with the club at the foot of the table.

Reserve Team Manager Joey Gibiliru took charge of the First Team for one match before Andy Paxton was appointed as Manager. The former Burnley, Clitheroe, Prescot Cables, Southport and Skelmersdale keeper left Skelmersdale to succeed Neil Prince at Valerie Park after working for more than five years alongside Skelmersdale boss Tommy Lawson where he was a coach.

=== History since 2016 ===
Paxton stepped down as manager in October 2016 and was replaced by former Skelmersdale assistant Brian Richardson, a former professional player with Blackpool. Richardson brought a number of players to Cables with him, including former F.C. Porto U19's captain Valter Fernandes.

Cables won the Liverpool Senior Cup for the first time in their history at the end of the 2016–17 season, beating Southport of the National League 2–0. The game went viral due to a video of the fence collapsing behind the goal as a result of the fans celebrations after the first goal was scored.

In the 2017–18 season, Cables defied the odds to finish 5th in the league qualifying them for a place in the promotion play-offs. They began the play-offs with a 3–0 win against Trafford at Valerie Park in the semi-finals in front of a crowd of 695. Prescot came up short in the play-off final, losing 1–0 away to an 80th-minute goal against Bamber Bridge

They successfully defended their Liverpool Senior Cup title after a 4–0 win away at Marine of the Northern Premier League in the final, handing the club their second ever title in the competition.

At the back end of 2018, the club were given a 99-year lease by Knowsley Council, who had taken ownership of the ground following on from issues with the previous owners going into administration during the financial crash in 2008.

Cables reached the final of the Liverpool Senior Cup for the fourth year running in the 2018–19 season but fell short in the final to Southport on penalties after the game finished 0-0.

Manager Brian Richardson departed Cables for FC United of Manchester in April 2019 and was replaced by joint managers Steve Pilling and Roy Grundy.

The 2019–20 season was spent mostly in and around mid-table before the early curtailment of the season due to the COVID-19 Pandemic. In July 2020, Pilling and Grundy left the club and were replaced by Craig Davies.

In 2021, with Cables in the relegation zone, Craig Davies left the club and was replaced by Kevin Lynch

Kevin Lynch successfully steered Cables away from relegation in the 2021–22 season.

In February 2023, Kevin Lynch stepped down as manager of Prescot for personal reasons and was replaced by Steven Daley

The 2023–24 season proved to be a memorable one for Prescot. A 3rd-place finish meant Cables qualified for the play-offs for the first time since 2017–18. Victories over Bootle F.C. and City of Liverpool F.C. in-front of capacity crowds at Valerie Park earnt Prescot promotion to the Northern Premier League Premier Division for the first time in 15 years.

On 15 July 2024, Steven Daley resigned as manager of Prescot Cables with Dave Dempsey taking over as manager.

On 19 July 2024, Daley was reappointed Prescot Cables manager.

On 25 April 2026, Prescot Cables were relegated back to the Northern Premier League West Division on the final day of the 25/26 campaign.

== Current squad ==
Note: Flags indicate national team as defined under FIFA eligibility rules; some limited exceptions apply. Players may hold more than one non-FIFA nationality.

No.	Pos.	Nation	Player
—	GK	ENG	Tony Thompson
—	DF	ENG	Dominic Cain (dual reg with Maghull)
—	DF	ENG	Peter Clarke
—	DF	ENG	Frazier Cookson
—	DF	ENG	Liam Hollett
—	DF	ENG	Paul Murphy-Worrell
—	DF	ENG	Joel Porter (dual reg with Maghull)
—	DF	ENG	Jack Rogers
—	DF	ENG	Matty Waters
—	MF	DEN	Sharif Deans
—	MF	ENG	James Devine

No.	Pos.	Nation	Player
—	MF	ENG	Tony Donaldson
—	MF	ENG	Charley Doyle
—	MF	ENG	Jack Loughran
—	MF	ENG	James Foley
—	MF	ENG	John Gregory
—	MF	ENG	Tom Scully
—	FW	ENG	Jake Burton (on loan from Warrington Rylands)
—	FW	ENG	Olly Molloy
—	FW	ENG	John Murphy
—	FW	ENG	Francis Smith
—	FW	ENG	Che Trappaso

== Non-playing staff ==
Position	Name
Manager	(England) Steven Daley
Assistant manager	(England) Peter Cumiskey
Coach	(England) Lee Dowding
Coach	(England) Tony Sullivan
Physio	(England) Alan Cross
Secretary	(England) Paul Goodwin

== Seasons ==
Season	Division	Position	Significant Events
2004–05	Northern Premier League Premier Division	5th	Qualification for Premier Division Play Offs
2005–06	Northern Premier League Premier Division	13th	
2006–07	Northern Premier League Premier Division	14th	
2007–08	Northern Premier League Premier Division	13th	
2008–09	Northern Premier League Premier Division	22nd	Relegation to Northern Premier League Division One North
2009–10	Northern Premier League Division One North	15th	
2010–11	Northern Premier League Division One North	21st	
2011–12	Northern Premier League Division One North	16th	
2012–13	Northern Premier League Division One North	17th	
2013–14	Northern Premier League Division One North	20th	
2014–15	Northern Premier League Division One North	20th	
2015–16	Northern Premier League Division One North	16th	
2016–17	Northern Premier League Division One North	16th	
2017–18	Northern Premier League Division One North	5th	Qualified for the North Division play-offs
2018–19	Northern Premier League Division One West	7th	
2019–20	Northern Premier League Division One West	14th	Season ended after 30 games due to the COVID-19 pandemic
2020–21	Northern Premier League Division One West	N/A	Season did not take place due to the COVID-19 pandemic
2021–22	Northern Premier League Division One West	18th	Reprieved from inter-step relegation play-offs due to best PPG tally.
2022–23	Northern Premier League Division One West	9th	
2023–24	Northern Premier League Division One West	3rd	Promoted to Northern Premier League Premier Division via play-offs
2024–25	Northern Premier League Premier Division	10th	

== Records ==
- Best FA Cup performance: First round, 1957–58, 1959–60
- Best FA Trophy performance, Second round, 2005–06, 2025–26
- Best FA Vase performance: Fifth round, 2002–03

== Honours ==
Honours	No.	Years
League
Northern Premier League Division One West Play Off Winners	1	2023–24
Northern Premier League Division One West Play Off Runners-Up	1	2017–18
North West Counties League Champions	1	2002–03
North West Counties League Runners-Up	1	2001–02
Cheshire County League Second Division Champions	1	1979–80
Mid Cheshire League Champions	1	1976–77
Lancashire Combination Champions	1	1956–57
Lancashire Combination Runners-Up	6	1930–31, 1931–32, 1932–33, 1952–53, 1957–58, 1958–59
Lancashire Combination Second Division Champions	1	1951–52
Lancashire Combination Second Division Runners-Up	2	1954–55, 1966–67
Cups
Liverpool Senior Cup Winners	2	2016–17, 2017–18
Liverpool Senior Cup Runners-Up	3	1979–80, 2015–16, 2018–19
North West Counties League Cup Winners	1	2001–02
North West Counties League Cup Runners-Up	1	1998–99
Mid Cheshire League Cup Runners-Up	1	1977–78
Liverpool Non-League Senior Cup Winners	3	1952–53, 1958–59, 1960–61
Liverpool Non-League Senior Cup Runners-Up	1	1956–57
Liverpool Challenge Cup Winners	6	1927–28, 1928–29, 1929–30, 1948–49, 1961–62, 1977–78
George Mahon Cup Winners	3	1923–24, 1926–27, 1936–37
Lancashire Combination Cup Winners	2	1938–39, 1947–48
Lancashire Combination Cup Runners-Up	1	1929–30
