= 2006–07 North West Counties Football League =

The 2006–07 North West Counties Football League season was the 25th in the history of the North West Counties Football League, a football competition in England.

The league comprised two divisions, Division One and Division Two (at levels 9 and 10 of the English football league system, Steps 5 and 6 of the National League System respectively). Additionally there were two cup competitions (both sponsored by d-zine (Contractors) Ltd): the League Challenge Cup knockout competition open to all the league's clubs and the Second Division Trophy, a knockout trophy competition for Division Two clubs only. The league also had a reserves team section.

== Division One ==
North West Counties Football League Division One
- Season: 2006–07
- Teams: 22
- Champions: F.C. United of Manchester
- Promoted: F.C. United of Manchester; Curzon Ashton; Nantwich Town
- Relegated: Stone Dominoes
- Matches: 462
- Goals: 1,618 (3.5 per match)
- Average attendance: 268

Division One featured 22 clubs, 19 remaining from the previous season plus 3 additions (all promoted from Division Two):

- F.C. United of Manchester, promoted as champions
- Flixton, promoted as runners up
- Nelson, promoted as third

Although not as significant as the previous season F.C. United of Manchester were responsible for the uplift in average attendance of the division to 268 from the previous season's 102: the combined home and away attendance at their matches of 85,809 represented 65% of the total league attendance of 132,547. They established a single match attendance record for Division One of 3,847 (on 28 April 2007 v. Formby).

Over their 42 league matches played F.C. United of Manchester created four records: a new league high of 36 wins in the season (exceeding the 35 by Cammell Laird in the previous season); a new league high of 157 league goals scored; a new league highest positive goal difference of 121 (surpassing in the latter two the records of Cammell Laird in Division Two in the 2004–05 season who from their 36 matches scored 142 goals with a 108 goal difference); and a new league record for points over the season with 112 (beating the previous of best, 106 from 42 matches, established by Atherton Laburnum Rovers in the 1992–93 season). Additionally they equalled the latter's Division One record of being defeated only twice in a 42 match league season. The average goals scored per match for all Division One matches increased to a new high of 3.50 (a marginal increase over the 3.48 of the 2001–02 season).

At the end of the season, owing to the additional clubs needed for the creation of North and South sections at Division One level of the Northern Premier League three clubs were promoted: the champions (as part of a league and cup double) F.C. United of Manchester and runners-up Curzon Ashton were both promoted to Northern Premier League Division One North; and third-placed Nantwich Town to Northern Premier League Division One South. Only one club was relegated to Division Two, Stone Dominoes who for the second successive season increased the record for the highest number of goals conceded in a season by a Division One club held by them to 147 from 146 the previous season, and this season exceeded the record for highest negative goal difference to 111 (from 110) and equalled the record for the least league wins in a season from 42 matches of 2 (both the latter previously established by Blackpool Mechanics in the 1992–93 season).

=== League table ===
Pos	Team	Pld	W	D	L	GF	GA	GD	Pts	Season End Notes
1	F.C. United of Manchester (C, P)	42	36	4	2	157	36	+121	112	Promoted to Northern Premier; League Division One North
2	Curzon Ashton (P)	42	31	6	5	116	38	+78	99	Promoted to Northern Premier; League Division One North
3	Nantwich Town (P)	42	29	8	5	108	41	+67	95	Promoted to Northern Premier; League Division One South
4	Salford City	42	26	9	7	103	55	+48	87	
5	Trafford	42	24	11	7	94	46	+48	83	
6	Maine Road	42	22	7	13	79	58	+21	73	
7	Atherton Collieries	42	19	13	10	72	55	+17	70	
8	Ramsbottom United	42	19	7	16	78	63	+15	64	
9	Glossop North End	42	19	6	17	71	71	0	63	
10	Congleton Town	42	18	8	16	75	62	+13	62	
11	Colne	42	16	13	13	75	70	+5	61	
12	Newcastle Town	42	16	10	16	70	63	+7	58	
13	Flixton	42	15	11	16	72	67	+5	56	
14	Silsden	42	16	6	20	66	79	−13	54	
15	Bacup Borough	42	11	13	18	50	65	−15	46	
16	Atherton Laburnum Rovers	42	11	9	22	65	106	−41	42	
17	Abbey Hey	42	10	10	22	44	83	−39	40	
18	Squires Gate	42	10	8	24	56	97	−41	38	
19	St Helens Town	42	10	6	26	47	92	−45	36	
20	Nelson	42	7	6	29	41	113	−72	27	
21	Formby	42	6	4	32	43	111	−68	22	
22	Stone Dominoes (R)	42	2	3	37	36	147	−111	9	Relegated to Division Two

Source: Non-League Matters: North West Counties League 2000–2011 & Tony's English Football Site: North West Counties Div One
Rules for classification: 1) points; 2) goal difference; 3) number of goals scored.
(C) Champions; (P) Promoted; (R) Relegated

== Division Two ==
North West Counties Football League Division Two
- Season: 2006–07
- Teams: 18
- Champions: Winsford United
- Promoted: Winsford United; Runcorn Linnets
- Relegated: None
- Matches: 306
- Goals: 983 (3.21 per match)
- Average attendance: 80

Division Two featured 18 clubs, 15 remaining from the previous season plus 3 additions:

- Ashton Athletic promoted as 4th in the Manchester League
- Bootle promoted from the Liverpool County Football Combination
- Runcorn Linnets a newly formed club

At the end of the season two clubs were promoted to Division One: the champions Winsford United and runners-up and league newcomers Runcorn Linnets. No other clubs left the division.

=== League table ===
Pos	Team	Pld	W	D	L	GF	GA	GD	Pts	Season End Notes
1	Winsford United (C, P)	34	23	7	4	82	35	+47	76	Promoted to Division One
2	Runcorn Linnets (P)	34	24	4	6	77	35	+42	76	Promoted to Division One
3	Padiham	34	21	6	7	75	39	+36	69	
4	New Mills	34	21	6	7	74	42	+32	69	
5	Chadderton	34	18	7	9	59	35	+24	61	
6	Oldham Town	34	17	5	12	69	54	+15	56	
7	Darwen	34	14	10	10	56	45	+11	52	
8	Ashton Town	34	15	7	12	55	56	−1	52	
9	Leek County School Old Boys	34	14	8	12	51	51	0	50	
10	Bootle	34	14	8	12	63	48	+15	46 (Note: Bootle had 4 points deducted)	
11	Eccleshall	34	12	6	16	44	46	−2	42	
12	Cheadle Town	34	9	8	17	41	60	−19	35	
13	Blackpool Mechanics	34	10	6	18	39	48	−9	30 (Note: Blackpool Mechanics had 6 points deducted)	
14	Holker Old Boys	34	6	11	17	47	81	−34	29	
15	Daisy Hill	34	7	8	19	38	78	−40	29	
16	Ashton Athletic	34	6	10	18	38	62	−24	28	
17	Norton United	34	6	7	21	37	73	−36	25	
18	Castleton Gabriels	34	5	4	25	38	95	−57	19	

Source: Non-League Matters: North West Counties League 2000–2011 & Tony's English Football Site: North West Counties Div Two
Rules for classification: 1) points; 2) goal difference; 3) number of goals scored.
(C) Champions; (P) Promoted

== League Challenge Cup ==
The 2006–07 League Challenge Cup (sponsored by d-zine (Contractors) Ltd) was a knockout competition open to all the league's clubs. The final featuring two Division One clubs, played at Curzon Ashton F.C., was won as part of a league and cup double by F.C. United of Manchester who defeated Curzon Ashton 2–1.

Semi-finals and Final

(The semi-finals were decided on aggregate score from two legs played)

Semi-finals
Curzon Ashton (D1)	3	4	7
Flixton (D1)	1	1	2
Congleton Town (D1)	2	3	5
F.C. United of Manchester (D1)	2	4	6

Final (Note: Played at Curzon Ashton F.C.)
Curzon Ashton (D1)	2
F.C. United of Manchester (D1)	3

Club's division appended to team name: (D1)=Division One
sources:

- Semi-finals: "Match Report 15th March 2007". FC United of Manchester.; "Match Report 31st March 2007". FC United of Manchester.; "Into the final". Manchester Evening News. April 2007.
- Final: "Match Report 3rd May 2007". FC United of Manchester.

== Second Division Trophy ==
The 2006–07 Second Division Trophy (sponsored by d-zine (Contractors) Ltd) was a knockout competition for Division Two clubs only. The winners were New Mills who defeated Oldham Town in the final.

== Reserves Section ==
Main honours for the 2006–07 season:

- Reserves Division
  - Winners: F.C. United of Manchester Reserves
  - Runners-up: New Mills Reserves
- Reserves Division Cup
  - Winners: F.C. United of Manchester Reserves
  - Runners-up: Padiham Reserves
