= 2007–08 North West Counties Football League =

The 2007–08 North West Counties Football League season (known as the Vodkat League for sponsorship reasons for the first of four seasons) was the 26th in the history of the North West Counties Football League, a football competition in England.

The league comprised two divisions (at levels 9 and 10 of the English football league system, Steps 5 and 6 of the National League System): this was the final season they were designated as Division One and Division Two, from next season they were renamed as Premier Division and First Division respectively. Additionally there were two cup competitions: the League Challenge Cup knockout competition (known as the Vodkat League Challenge Cup for sponsorship reasons) open to all the league's clubs; and the Second Division Trophy, a knockout trophy competition for Division Two clubs only. The league also had a reserves team section.

== Division One ==
North West Counties Football League Division One
- Season: 2007–08
- Teams: 20
- Champions: Trafford
- Promoted: Salford City; Trafford
- Relegated: None
- Matches: 380
- Goals: 1,217 (3.2 per match)
- Average attendance: 95

As three clubs had been promoted from the 2006–07 season Division One to the Northern Premier League the number of clubs was reduced from the 22 of the previous five seasons to 20 clubs: 18 remained from the previous season plus 2 additions (both promoted from Division Two):

- Runcorn Linnets promoted as runners-up
- Winsford United promoted as champions

At the end of the season two clubs were promoted to the Northern Premier League Division One North: the champions Trafford and runners-up Salford City. As the division was to be returned to 22 clubs next season no clubs were relegated.

=== League table ===
| Pos | Team | Pld | W | D | L | GF | GA | GD | Pts | Season End Notes |
|---|---|---|---|---|---|---|---|---|---|---|
| 1 | Trafford (C, P) | 38 | 30 | 5 | 3 | 102 | 35 | +67 | 95 | Promoted to Northern Premier; League Division One North |
| 2 | Salford City (P) | 38 | 26 | 6 | 6 | 75 | 35 | +40 | 84 | Promoted to Northern Premier; League Division One North |
| 3 | Newcastle Town | 38 | 24 | 7 | 7 | 95 | 45 | +50 | 79 | |
| 4 | Maine Road | 38 | 20 | 8 | 10 | 75 | 45 | +30 | 68 | |
| 5 | Colne | 38 | 19 | 11 | 8 | 69 | 45 | +24 | 68 | |
| 6 | Squires Gate | 38 | 19 | 9 | 10 | 52 | 43 | +9 | 66 | |
| 7 | Glossop North End | 38 | 20 | 5 | 13 | 72 | 46 | +26 | 65 | |
| 8 | Flixton | 38 | 17 | 7 | 14 | 65 | 65 | 0 | 58 | |
| 9 | Congleton Town | 38 | 17 | 6 | 15 | 73 | 60 | +13 | 57 | |
| 10 | Winsford United | 38 | 16 | 8 | 14 | 60 | 47 | +13 | 56 | |
| 11 | Silsden | 38 | 15 | 10 | 13 | 65 | 57 | +8 | 55 | |
| 12 | Runcorn Linnets | 38 | 14 | 6 | 18 | 53 | 64 | −11 | 48 | |
| 13 | Formby | 38 | 14 | 3 | 21 | 52 | 60 | −8 | 42 (Note: Formby had 3 points deducted) | |
| 14 | St Helens Town | 38 | 11 | 8 | 19 | 64 | 93 | −29 | 41 | |
| 15 | Atherton Collieries | 38 | 10 | 10 | 18 | 44 | 67 | −23 | 40 | |
| 16 | Ramsbottom United | 38 | 9 | 10 | 19 | 41 | 59 | −18 | 37 | |
| 17 | Abbey Hey | 38 | 6 | 9 | 23 | 45 | 106 | −61 | 27 | |
| 18 | Bacup Borough | 38 | 5 | 11 | 22 | 35 | 69 | −34 | 26 | |
| 19 | Atherton Laburnum Rovers | 38 | 5 | 9 | 24 | 38 | 86 | −48 | 24 | |
| 20 | Nelson | 38 | 5 | 8 | 25 | 42 | 90 | −48 | 23 | |

Source: "Final Tables, Season 2007/08". nwcfl.com., "North West Counties League 2000–11: 2007–08". nonleaguematters.co.uk.
Rules for classification: 1) points; 2) goal difference; 3) number of goals scored.
(C) Champions; (P) Promoted

== Division Two ==
North West Counties Football League Division Two
- Season: 2007–08
- Teams: 18
- Champions: New Mills
- Promoted: Ashton Athletic; Kirkham & Wesham; New Mills
- Relegated: None
- Matches: 306
- Goals: 1,052 (3.44 per match)
- Average attendance: 67

Division Two featured 18 clubs, 16 remaining from the previous season plus 2 additions:

- Stone Dominoes relegated from Division One
- Kirkham & Wesham promoted as champions of the West Lancashire League

At the end of the season as the number of clubs in the division above was to be increased next season the top three clubs were promoted to the Premier Division (formerly Division One): the champions New Mills, runners-up and league newcomers Kirkham & Wesham and third placed Ashton Athletic. No other clubs left the division.

=== League table ===
| Pos | Team | Pld | W | D | L | GF | GA | GD | Pts | Season End Notes |
|---|---|---|---|---|---|---|---|---|---|---|
| 1 | New Mills (C, P) | 34 | 28 | 3 | 3 | 107 | 23 | +84 | 87 | Promoted to Premier Division (formerly Division One) |
| 2 | Kirkham & Wesham (P) | 34 | 24 | 5 | 5 | 88 | 31 | +57 | 77 | Promoted to Premier Division (formerly Division One) |
| 3 | Ashton Athletic (P) | 34 | 20 | 7 | 7 | 68 | 35 | +33 | 67 | Promoted to Premier Division (formerly Division One) |
| 4 | Oldham Town | 34 | 19 | 7 | 8 | 79 | 44 | +35 | 64 | |
| 5 | Chadderton | 34 | 19 | 4 | 11 | 55 | 52 | +3 | 61 | |
| 6 | Bootle | 34 | 18 | 6 | 10 | 86 | 53 | +33 | 60 | |
| 7 | Leek County School Old Boys | 34 | 16 | 7 | 11 | 57 | 51 | +6 | 55 | |
| 8 | Norton United | 34 | 13 | 11 | 10 | 47 | 52 | −5 | 50 | |
| 9 | Blackpool Mechanics | 34 | 11 | 12 | 11 | 47 | 45 | +2 | 45 | |
| 10 | Stone Dominoes | 34 | 12 | 8 | 14 | 60 | 59 | +1 | 44 | |
| 11 | Darwen | 34 | 13 | 5 | 16 | 55 | 65 | −10 | 44 | |
| 12 | Padiham | 34 | 11 | 8 | 15 | 50 | 48 | +2 | 41 | |
| 13 | Ashton Town | 34 | 12 | 4 | 18 | 53 | 80 | −27 | 40 | |
| 14 | Cheadle Town | 34 | 10 | 6 | 18 | 44 | 80 | −36 | 33 (Note: Cheadle Town had 3 points deducted) | |
| 15 | Eccleshall | 34 | 8 | 6 | 20 | 41 | 69 | −28 | 30 | |
| 16 | Holker Old Boys | 34 | 8 | 2 | 24 | 41 | 82 | −41 | 26 | |
| 17 | Castleton Gabriels | 34 | 6 | 6 | 22 | 46 | 97 | −51 | 24 | |
| 18 | Daisy Hill | 34 | 2 | 5 | 27 | 28 | 86 | −58 | 11 | |

Source: "Final Tables, Season 2007/08". nwcfl.com., "North West Counties League 2000-11: 2007–08". nonleaguematters.co.uk.
Rules for classification: 1) points; 2) goal difference; 3) number of goals scored.
(C) Champions; (P) Promoted

== League Challenge Cup ==
The 2007–08 League Challenge Cup (known as the Vodkat League Challenge Cup for sponsorship reasons) was a knockout competition open to all the league's clubs. The final, played at Curzon Ashton F.C., was won by Division One club Maine Road who defeated Division Two Bootle 5–3 on penalties after the match finished 2–2 after extra time (score at 90 minutes, 2–2).

Quarter-finals, Semi-finals and Final

(The semi-finals were decided on aggregate score from two legs played)

Quarter-finals
Squires Gate (D1) | 0
Bootle (D2) | 2
Winsford United (D1) | 2
Salford City (D1) | 0
Cheadle Town (D2) | 0
Maine Road (D1) | 4
Oldham Town (D2) | 0
Chadderton (D2) | 3

Semi-finals
Bootle (D2) | 2 | 2 | 4
Winsford United (D1) | 2 | 1 | 3
Maine Road (D1) | 0 | 6 | 6
Chadderton (D2) | 0 | 0 | 0

Final (Note: Played at Curzon Ashton F.C.)
Bootle (D2) | 2 (Note: After extra time, score at 90 minutes: 2–2) | (3 p) (Note: Penalty shots)
Maine Road (D1) | 2 | (5 p)

Club's division appended to team name: (D1)=Division One; (D2)=Division Two
sources:

- Quarter-finals: "Fixtures & Results: Saturday 16th February 2008: Vodkat League Cup – Quarter-Finals". nwcfl.co.uk. February 2008. Archived from the original on 9 May 2008.
- Semi-finals: Andrew Moffatt (24 March 2008). "Bootle make Challenge Cup final against the odds". The Free Library: Daily Post (Liverpool).
- Final: "Shoot–out stunner for Bootle". Liverpool Echo.

== Second Division Trophy ==
The 2007–08 Second Division Trophy was a knockout competition for Division Two clubs only. In the final league newcomers Kirkham & Wesham defeated Bootle 1–0. (Bootle were also losing finalists in the League Challenge Cup),

Semi-finals and Final

(The semi-finals were decided on aggregate score from two legs played)

Semi-finals
Chadderton | 1 | 0 | 1
Bootle | 0 | 2 | 2
Ashton Athletic | 0 | 1 | 1
Kirkham & Wesham | 0 | 2 | 2

Final
Bootle | 0
Kirkham & Wesham | 1

sources:

- Semi-finals: "Fixtures & Results: Saturday 23 February 2008: Division Two Trophy - Semi-Finals First Leg". nwcfl.co.uk. February 2008. Archived from the original on 9 May 2008.; "Fixtures & Results: Tuesday 18 March 2008: Division Two Trophy - Semi-Finals Second Leg". nwcfl.co.uk. March 2008. Archived from the original on 9 May 2008.; "Fixtures & Results: Thursday 27 March 2008: Division Two Trophy – Semi-Finals Second Leg". nwcfl.co.uk. March 2008. Archived from the original on 9 May 2008.
- Final: "Fixtures & Results: Thursday 24 April 2008: Division Two Trophy - Final". nwcfl.co.uk. April 2008. Archived from the original on 9 May 2008.

== Reserves Section ==
Main honours for the 2007–08 season:

- Reserves Division
  - Winners: Bootle Reserves
  - Runners-up: Glossop North End Reserves
- Reserves Division Cup
  - Winners: New Mills Reserves
  - Runners-up: Glossop North End Reserves
