= Carlton Town F.C. =

Association football club in England

Coordinates: 52°58′17″N 01°03′46″W

Carlton Town
- Full name: Carlton Town Football Club
- Nickname: The Millers
- Founded: 1904 (as Sneinton Football Club)
- Ground: Bill Stokeld Stadium, Gedling
- Capacity: 1,968
- Chairman: Mick Garton
- Manager: Tommy Brookbanks and Mark Harvey
- League: Northern Premier League Division One Midlands
- 2025–26: Northern Premier League Division One Midlands, 2nd of 22
- Website: https://www.carltontownfc.co.uk/
Home colours	Away colours

Carlton Town Football Club is a semi-professional football club based in Gedling, Nottinghamshire, England. Founded in 1904 as Sneinton Football Club, its early years were marked by considerable local success, leading to the club being described by the Manchester Courier in 1909 as "the leading amateur football club in Nottingham". Its reputation declined for several decades afterwards, with the team participating in obscure county divisions until the 1995–96 season saw the club join the nationwide league system. Carlton currently competes in the Northern Premier League Division One Midlands at the eighth tier of the English football pyramid.

Carlton has played its home games at the Bill Stokeld Stadium since the early 1990s. It won promotion in 2006–07 from the Premier Division of the Northern Counties East Football League, competing in the NCEL's Division One and two Central Midlands League divisions before that. Tournament records include reaching the third round of the FA Amateur Cup in 1907–08, 1910–11, 1919–20 and 1930–31; the third qualifying round of the FA Cup in 2012–13 and 2013–14; the first round of the FA Trophy in 2021–22; and the third round of the FA Vase in 2005–06. The club is nicknamed "The Millers" and its colours are primarily yellow and blue.

== History ==
=== Establishment and pre-World War I ===
Carlton Town was founded as Sneinton Football Club in September 1904, beginning in the amateur Notts Alliance League after having a previous application refused. The team enjoyed success in their first season; finishing runners-up to Basford United, Sneinton then moved to sign more promising locals. In May 1905, the club gained use of the Earl Manvers’ Colwick Lawn Estate, the Sneinton Cricket Club and Ground, on Colwick Road. Becoming champions in the 1905–06 season, mixed fortunes followed as key players Arthur Clamp and Andrew Mosley joined Notts County, while new tram infrastructure in the area promised better attendances at home games.

Sneinton won the League championship again in 1907–08, also reaching the first round of the Notts Alliance Cup and losing to Oxford City in the third round of the FA Amateur Cup. The club was granted membership of The Football Association on 2 November 1908. The League title was defended in 1908–09, but Sutton Town eliminated Sneinton from both of its cup competitions. Described by the Manchester Courier as "the leading amateur football club in Nottingham", Sneinton won the 1909–10 League, becoming the first team to win three consecutive titles. The following year they again reached the third round of the Amateur Cup, where they lost 6–2 to Bromley. Their playing form suffered by the end of the 1912–13 season, with the team losing several players to injury and relocation.

=== Interwar period ===
Nine Sneinton players were killed in World War I, for the duration of which the team was disbanded. The club reformed on 29 April 1919, and did well in the 1919–20 season, once more obtaining a place in the Amateur Cup's third round. Sneinton lacked the means to travel and insisted the match be played in Nottingham, securing Notts County's Meadow Lane as a venue, but they lost 8–1 to Leytonstone. Despite team rebuilding and many injuries, Sneinton finished an encouraging third in their 1920–21 League campaign. Conversely, the 1922–23 season witnessed mediocre playing form and a poor financial situation at the club. These were recurrent problems throughout the decade, except for the team becoming joint-winners of the 1925–26 Notts Alliance Cup.

The club's fortunes improved in 1931 as it reached the Amateur Cup's third round for a fourth, and final, time. Acknowledging Sneinton as a "nursery" for their professional squads, Notts County and Nottingham Forest paid for the team's travel to Stockton, where they were defeated 7–2. In May 1932, Sneinton applied to join the Notts Spartan League's First Division, securing the title on its first attempt before finishing third in the Senior Division in 1933–34 after turning an annual profit. Given the absence of financial backers, moving leagues was intended to allow the team to play at a lower standard than that of the Notts Alliance. Reviewing the 1936–37 and 1938–39 seasons, Sneinton was judged by its officials to be in good sporting and financial shape.

=== Post-World War II ===
==== Sneinton revival: 1947–2002 ====
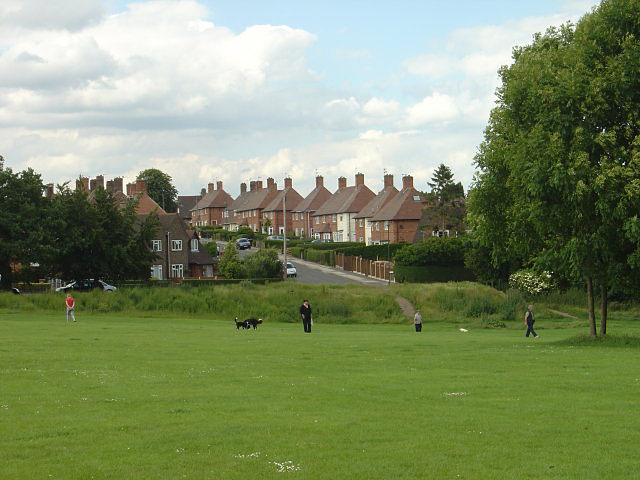
Colwick Wood Park, site of the club's former home pitch

Following another disbandment due to World War II, Sneinton reformed in July 1947, also absorbing local club Trent Rangers. According to the Nottingham Evening Post, it was "realised that a lot of hard work will be necessary to restore the ... club to the old time high position". In 1948, the team started playing on a pitch at Colwick Wood Park, thereby returning to Sneinton after contesting one season at a venue outside the district. The club moved to Division Three of the Notts Amateur League, finishing seventh in 1949–50 and with steady finances. After a loss to Bakersfield in the 1951–52 campaign, the Nottingham Football Post commented that the team "appeared to be too individualistic".

The club had achieved promotion to Division Two by 1956–57. In 1957–58, the team's prolific goal-scoring led to an undefeated run lasting almost three months. The Football Post commented that year that "the Sneintonians are doing very well", but just two years later, during the 1959–60 season, argued that the team was "lacking in a marksman" and "need[ed] more punch in attack". Illnesses and outside work commitments within its part-time squad were a challenge for the club, but the Football Post still acknowledged the high quality of Sneinton's teamwork, goalkeeping, and defence.

During 1965–66, the club struggled to field a full team at times, occasionally requiring its secretary to play. Sneinton experienced poor form in the 1967–68 season, but avoided relegation, and again transferred leagues a year later, ahead of the 1969–70 season, to rejoin Division Two of the Notts Alliance. The first season saw the team endure mediocre League performances and disciplinary issues, but by the 1976–77 campaign was described by the Football Post as "much-improved". In spite of this, Sneinton suffered some heavy defeats; the team lost 9–0 to Rolls-Royce Welfare in 1977–78, and lost by the same score to Worthington Simpsons Reserves during the following season. Sneinton won the division in 1984–85, gaining promotion to Division One; it later topped that level in 1992–93 to reach the Notts Alliance's pinnacle Senior Division.

Eager to move beyond the local amateur scene and advance up the English football pyramid, the club moved to its current ground on Stoke Lane in Gedling, and in 1995–96 joined the Central Midlands Football League at the eleventh tier of the league system. Notwithstanding a reasonable first season, Sneinton was left with no manager and just three players for its 1996–97 campaign. The club's chairman, Bill Stokeld, appointed former players Tommy Brookbanks and Neil Cooper as joint-team managers. Under their stewardship, promotion from the League's Premier Division to its topmost level, the Supreme Division, was achieved in 1997–98. Sneinton's third-place finish in the tenth tier in 2000–01 would ordinarily have secured entrance to the Northern Counties East Football League, but their ground did not meet the minimum standards for the higher Division.

==== Carlton Town: 2002–present ====
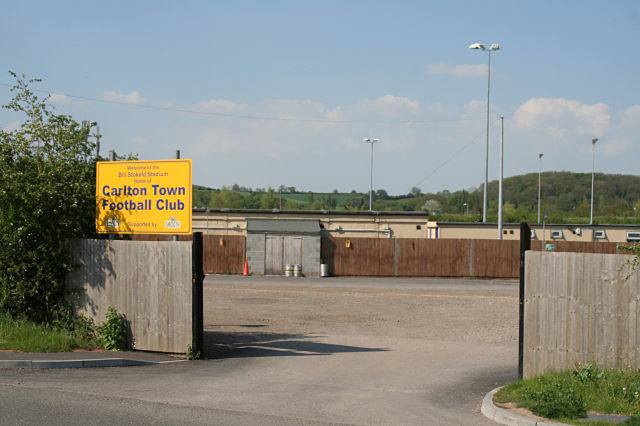
Entrance to the Bill Stokeld Stadium, Carlton's current home ground

Historically, Gedling was located in a parish named "Carlton-le-Willows" and once formed part of the Carlton Urban District. Reflecting its new home, Sneinton became Carlton Town Football Club in 2002. Mick Garton, who became chairman that year, invested nearly £200,000 in the team's facilities ahead of the 2002–03 campaign in order to ensure that the ground met the standards that would be required for promotion from the League. (Note: £200,000 in 2002 equated approximately to £346,100 in 2021; this figure is calculated from the increase in Retail Price Index (RPI) percentage between the two years.) That season, Carlton topped the Central Midlands League Supreme Division; the club then spent three campaigns in the Northern Counties East Football League's Division One, at the tenth tier of the football league system, finishing third in 2004–05. (Note: By default, 2004–05 saw the Northern Counties East Football League's Division One drop from tier nine to ten due to creation of the Conference North at level six of the league system.) The team were promoted to the ninth tier when they finished as League champions in 2005–06, also establishing a club record in the FA Vase that year by reaching its third round. 2006–07 saw Carlton promoted once again, this time to the Northern Premier League Division One South at tier eight. The club finished tenth out of 22 in 2007–08 but challenged for promotion in the following year, eventually losing in the League's 2008–09 playoff semi-final 5–2 to Stocksbridge Park Steels, for whom future England international Jamie Vardy scored a hat-trick.

Carlton finished ninth in 2009–10 and replaced Brookbanks by appointing Les McJannet as manager. Despite initial relegation fears, Carlton placed eighth in 2010–11. After being runners-up and playoff semi-finalists in the division's 2011–12 contest, the team's League form dipped in the following seasons as they finished twelfth, tenth, and eighteenth respectively. In combination with poor tournament results in 2014–15—contrary to the previous two seasons, which twice saw the team reach the FA Cup's third qualifying round—this led to McJannet's resignation. His assistant Wayne Scott took charge beginning with the following season. Scott's tenure saw poor League finishes of no higher than eighteenth. Relegation had only been avoided by the club after the 2018–19 season because of ground grading problems at fifteenth-placed A.F.C. Mansfield, which was demoted from the League in Carlton's stead.

Brookbanks, alongside Mark Harvey, returned to replace Scott in May 2019. Their first full season was abandoned owing to COVID-19. Geographical reorganisation of the Northern Premier League has meant that Carlton has played in Division One East in 2018–19 and from 2022–23, Division One South East in 2019–20 and 2020–21, and Division One Midlands in 2021–22. Early 2020 presented significant financial challenges, firstly due to ground damage caused by Storm Ciara, and then a drop in revenue because of the coronavirus pandemic. The 2021–22 season saw the club place sixth in the League, narrowly missing out on the playoffs. The team did, however, set a new club record in the FA Trophy by reaching its first round proper.

=== Season-by-season record since 1995–96 ===
Season	Division	Level	Position	FA Cup	FA Trophy	FA Vase	Notes
1995–96	Central Midlands Football League Premier Division	11	6th/18	-	-	-	
1996–97	Central Midlands Football League Premier Division	11	7th/18	-	-	-	
1997–98	Central Midlands Football League Premier Division	11	3rd/18	-	-	-	Promoted
1998–99	Central Midlands Football League Supreme Division	10	13th/19	-	-	-	
1999–2000	Central Midlands Football League Supreme Division	10	10th/19	-	-	-	
2000–01	Central Midlands Football League Supreme Division	10	3rd/20	-	-	-	Promotion denied due to ground grading issues
2001–02	Central Midlands Football League Supreme Division	10	5th/20	-	-	-	
2002–03	Central Midlands Football League Supreme Division	10	1st/20	-	-	2R	Became Carlton Town; promoted as champions
2003–04	Northern Counties East Football League Division One	9	9th/18	EPR	-	2QR	
2004–05	Northern Counties East Football League Division One	10	3rd/16	2QR	-	2R	Division dropped a tier by default due to creation of the Conference North at level six of the league system
2005–06	Northern Counties East Football League Division One	10	1st/16	PR	-	3R	Promoted as champions
2006–07	Northern Counties East Football League Premier Division	9	3rd/20	EPR	-	2R	Promoted
2007–08	Northern Premier League Division One South	8	10th/18	1QR	PR	-	
2008–09	Northern Premier League Division One South	8	4th/20	PR	1QR	-	Defeated in playoffs
2009–10	Northern Premier League Division One South	8	9th/22	2QR	2QR	-	
2010–11	Northern Premier League Division One South	8	8th/22	2QR	1QR	-	
2011–12	Northern Premier League Division One South	8	2nd/22	2QR	PR	-	Runners-up on goal difference; defeated in playoffs
2012–13	Northern Premier League Division One South	8	12th/22	3QR	PR	-	
2013–14	Northern Premier League Division One South	8	10th/21	3QR	PR	-	
2014–15	Northern Premier League Division One South	8	18th/22	1QR	1QR	-	
2015–16	Northern Premier League Division One South	8	18th/22	PR	2QR	-	
2016–17	Northern Premier League Division One South	8	19th/22	PR	1QR	-	
2017–18	Northern Premier League Division One South	8	19th/22	PR	1QR	-	
2018–19	Northern Premier League Division One East	8	19th/22	PR	2QR	-	Division reorganised and renamed; reprieved from relegation due to ground grading issues at A.F.C. Mansfield
2019–20	Northern Premier League Division One South East	8	N/A	EPR	1QR	-	Division reorganised and renamed; league abandoned due to COVID-19
2020–21	Northern Premier League Division One South East	8	N/A	1QR	2QR	-	League abandoned due to COVID-19
2021–22	Northern Premier League Division One Midlands	8	6th/20	1QR	1R	-	Division reorganised and renamed
2022–23	Northern Premier League Division One East	8	17th/20			–	
2023–24	Northern Premier League Division One East	8	5th/20			–	Defeated in play-off semi-final
2024–25	Northern Premier League Division One East	8	7th/22			–	
2025–26	Northern Premier League Division One Midlands	8	2nd/22			–	Defeated in play-off semi-final

== Club identity ==
The club's former badge, used until 2007

Carlton has played in a home kit largely comprising yellow and blue since at least the 2003–04 campaign. Away kits have generally been more varied; these have featured a red ensemble for 2003–04 and 2004–05, a navy and sky blue design for 2005–06 and 2006–07, a green and white combination for the 2015–16 season, a red and white mix for 2021–22, as well as a pairing of pink and black for 2022–23. An additional third kit was released in 2021 which used neon green. The home kit mirrors the colours of the club badge, introduced in July 2007, which also depicts Carlton Town's initials, year of foundation, and common nickname—the "Millers". Green's Mill remains a well-known focal point in the Sneinton area, the original home of the team, and in Nottingham more widely.

Prior to this rebranding, Carlton lacked a nickname altogether, while the club's previous logo comprised a blue and white football on which black text with a yellow shadow, reading "Carlton Town FC", was wrapped diagonally. The club has a current rivalry with Basford United; it also shared one with the defunct Greenwood Rovers during its time in the Notts Amateur League.

== Grounds ==
=== Colwick Road and Colwick Wood Park ===
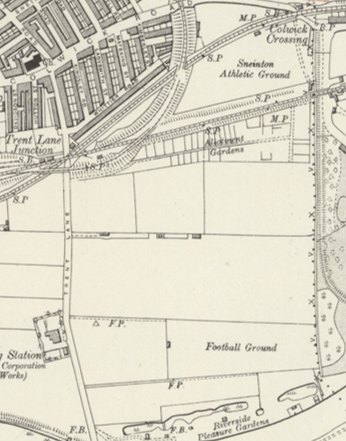
1920 Ordnance Survey map depicting the club's Colwick Road ground (bottom right), Sneinton's home between 1905 and 1942

Though the club sought away matches as early as October 1904, May 1905 saw Sneinton gain use of the Sneinton Cricket Club and Ground on Colwick Road. Located on the Colwick Lawn Estate, its owner, the Earl Manvers, led the Sneinton Improvement Committee in providing "a ground possessing many natural and distinct advantages". Chiefly intended for cricket, its eight-and-a-half acres, including four pitches, met the needs of both the Sneinton Cricket and Football Club. A "fine new enclosed ground" was reserved for football. Featuring a pavilion and accommodation for players, the facilities cost £300 and were opened by the Sheriff of Nottingham. (Note: £300 in 1905 equated approximately to £34,270 in 2021; this figure accounts for the increase in Retail Price Index (RPI) percentage between the two years.) The Nottingham Journal reported the site to be "under water" in December 1909 as a consequence of the adjacent River Trent flooding after heavy precipitation. By July 1913, the Improvement Committee moved to sub-let the team's ground, leading the club to appoint a deputation through which to protest.

Sneinton was without a venue in the aftermath of World War I. Refusing their opponent's request to the contrary, the team remained in Nottingham to play the 1919–20 FA Amateur Cup fixture against Leytonstone, using Notts County's Meadow Lane. It was back at Colwick Road by February 1927 but faced frequent trespass and vandalism. With the permission of Nottingham Forest in December 1929, Sneinton instead played its first round Amateur Cup tie versus Horsforth St Margaret's at the City Ground. The Nottingham Evening Post opined that the addition of another pitch and modifications to the pavilion at Colwick Road in 1935 permitted increased youth engagement. The ground changed hands during World War II, becoming the home of Parliament Street Methodists in 1944 after Sneinton left it in 1942. After reforming in 1947, the club relocated to one of two public pitches at Colwick Wood Park in 1948, having played its matches in the intervening year at an alternative venue outside the district.

=== Bill Stokeld Stadium ===
In the early 1990s, the club moved to its current location on Stoke Lane in Gedling. Chairman Mick Garton invested nearly £200,000 in upgrading Carlton's site and facilities in 2002, which, two years later, were named in remembrance of his predecessor Bill Stokeld. Disruption occurred early in the 2006–07 season when a link road was built through the ground, requiring a relocation of the pitch within the premises. This precluded Carlton playing at home for the first month of the campaign. Ahead of the team's promotion at the end of that season, League requirements inspired the addition of changing areas, a hospitality venue, toilets, and a tea bar. These facilities were later subjected to incidents of arson and burglary between 2011 and 2012. As of 2022, an academy suite, disabled access provision, and 30 car-parking spaces are also features of the stadium.

Storm Ciara caused £3,000 worth of damage to the ground in February 2020, which impacted its fencing, floodlights, goals, and dugouts. However, in the following month, the site passed a safety inspection which allowed Carlton to raise its spectator capacity from 1,500 to 1,968 (with 164 seated). Despite this, the record gate is reported by the club as only being "over 800" during a pre-season friendly against Notts County.

== Honours ==
Honour	Year(s)
Notts Alliance League; Champions	1905–06, 1907–08, 1908–09, 1909–10
Notts Alliance Cup; Winners	1925–26
Carlton and District Charity Cup; Winners	1928–29
Notts Spartan League; First Division champions	1932–33
Notts Alliance League; Division Two champions	1984–85
Notts Intermediate Cup; Winners	1991–92
Notts Alliance League; Division One champions	1992–93
Central Midlands League; Supreme Division champions	2002–03
Northern Counties East Football League; Division One champions	2005–06
Notts Senior Cup; Winners	2012–13, 2013–14, 2016–17, 2021–22

== National tournament records ==
Record	Year(s)
FA Amateur Cup; Third round	1907–08, 1910–11, 1919–20, 1930–31
FA Cup; Third qualifying round	2012–13, 2013–14
FA Trophy; First round	2021–22
FA Vase; Third round	2005–06
