= Runcorn Linnets F.C. =

Association football club in England

Runcorn Linnets
- Full name: Runcorn Linnets Football Club
- Nicknames: Yellows; Linnets
- Founded: 28 April 2006
- Ground: APEC Taxis Stadium
- Capacity: 1,600
- Coordinates: 53.3161°N 2.6705°W
- Chairman: Peter Cartledge
- Manager: Jacques Welsh and Peter Wylie
- League: Northern Premier League Division One West
- 2025–26: Northern Premier League Division One West, 4th of 22
- Website: runcornlinnetsfc.co.uk
Home colours	Away colours

Runcorn Linnets F.C. are an English football club based in Runcorn, Cheshire. The club currently plays in the Northern Premier League Division One West, and is a full member of the Cheshire County Football Association. The club is run by a trust which is a registered society under the Co-operative and Community Benefit Societies Act 2014, and is registered with the Financial Services Authority.

== History ==
The club badge was the arms of the former Runcorn Urban District Council until a rebrand in 2020

The club was formed on 28 April 2006 as a replacement for the town's previous club, Runcorn F.C. Halton, which had resigned from the Northern Premier League due to financial difficulties. The original Runcorn club's biggest success had been winning the 1981–82 Alliance Premier League title, although they failed to reach the Football League as the league's members had voted against them joining. The club is run by the Supporters Trust, which had been set up as "The Linnets Independent Supporters Trust", and the new club joined two levels further down the football pyramid, in the North West Counties Football League Division Two, having been accepted into the league on 17 June. A groundshare with Witton Albion was arranged at the start of the 2006–07 season, until a suitable ground could be found in Runcorn. This was achieved in 2010, when the club moved into a newly built ground on Murdishaw Avenue and named it the Millbank Linnets Stadium as part of a three-year sponsorship deal.

Steve Carragher who had played for and managed Runcorn FC Halton, joined the club as manager, with Mark Philips as his assistant player-manager. Several players from the old club also joined the Linnets. Their first game was a 4–0 away win against Ashton Town, followed by a 5–0 victory at home to Castleton Gabriels. Runcorn finished their inaugural season as runners-up, losing out on the league title to Winsford United on goal difference, and won promotion to the First Division. Thomas Lamb finished the season as the top scorer, with 22 goals in all competitions.

In the 2007–08 season, Linnets spent most of their time in mid-table. They won their first ever FA Vase game against Daisy Hill, before losing to Salford City in the First round. After a string of poor results, the board decided that a change of management was needed and Steve Wilkes was appointed as manager in January 2008. They finished the season twelfth out of 20 clubs. During the close season, the league was restructured with the First Division becoming the Premier Division. In the 2008–09 season Linnets entered the FA Cup for the first time, winning their first game 3–2 at home to Rossington Main on 17 August 2008. In the next round, they lost 4–0 to Curzon Ashton on 30 August. Recently the club has announced a youth team in every age group up to the under 16s. In 2011–12 they were the only team from the NWCFL to get to the Second Qualifying Round of the FA Cup.

After three consecutive seasons of finishing runners-up, Runcorn finished fourth in the 2016–17 season, which was their lowest in four years. In the 2017–18 season, Runcorn Linnets finished the season in first, four points ahead of second placed Widnes, who also gained promotion. Runcorn also went on to have the highest number of goals scored and the fewest goals conceded.

After two seasons being cancelled due to the Covid pandemic, Runcorn finished 4th in the 2021–22 season. They beat Leek 4–1 in the playoff semi final but lost 2–1 to Marine in the playoff final with a sellout crowd of 1,600 at the APEC Taxis Stadium. Calum McIntyre left his role as manager at the end of season to join Chester.

In the 2022–23 season Runcorn made it to the Liverpool Senior Cup final where they once again lost to Marine on penalties at the DCBL Stadium after a 0–0 draw in front of 2,651 fans. Runcorn finished 6th in this season with manager Dave Wild leaving the club before the play offs, with Billy Paynter taking over till the end of the season. The club went on to win away at Leek in the playoff semi final before losing their third final in a year against Workington 2–1 after extra time in the play off final, despite going 1–0 up early on. Billy then remained as Runcorn manager for the upcoming season.

In the 2023–24 season Runcorn once again qualified for the Northern Premier League West playoffs with a second-place finish. They lost 2–0 to City of Liverpool FC in the semi final. Following the loss, manager Billy Paynter stepped down from his position, after just over a year in charge. Antony Kay was announced as the new Runcorn manager ahead of the 2024–25 season, after appearing 41 times for the Yellows the previous season. On 2 January 2026 after a 5-0 defeat at home to Witton Albion FC, manager Brad Cooke stepped down and on January 5, Michael Ellison returned to the club as manager for a second stint after leading Widnes FC to the title the previous year.

== Stadium ==
The club used to groundshare with Witton Albion at the Wincham Park stadium in Northwich. However, they had a stated aim to move back to Runcorn with a new stadium project – R2R (Return 2 Runcorn). A working party was established to work towards the move. The club had been in discussion with Riverside College about leasing a plot of land at the Runcorn Campus, but this proposal was rejected. The next plan involved a move to Halton Sports in Murdishaw, Runcorn for the start of the 2010–11 season, and this has now been completed, largely due to the backing of the local council. The club's aims were to build a ground that would meet the Northern Premier League standard, together with a Community centre which would be used as the clubhouse on matchdays. The club also want to include an all-weather pitch on the site for use by local sporting organisations and groups. The opening match took place on 17 July 2010 and was a friendly against Witton Albion, partly as old rivals but mainly as an appreciation of their help in establishing a base for Runcorn Linnets F.C. in its foundation years.

From the start of the 2020–21 season Runcorn Linnets will play on a state of the art hybrid grass pitch. The pitch will also enable the club to increase community engagement. From the 2025-26 season, Runcorn would be ground-sharing the APEC with Northwich Victoria.

== Honours ==
Updated 13 May 2025.

- NWCFL League Cup: Winners: 2012-13
- NWCFL Premier Division: Champions: 2017-18
- Cheshire Senior Cup: Winners: 2024-25

== Players ==
=== Current squad ===
Updated 31 May 2026.

Note: Flags indicate national team as defined under FIFA eligibility rules; some limited exceptions apply. Players may hold more than one non-FIFA nationality.

No.	Pos.	Nation	Player
—	GK	ENG	Calvin Hare
—	DF	ENG	Peter Wylie
—	DF	ENG	Matty Rain
—	DF	ENG	Oliver Southern
—	DF	ENG	Ed Jones
—	DF	ENG	Scott Holding
—	DF	ENG	Kian Bell
—	MF	ENG	Declan McLoughlin
—	MF	ENG	Eden Gumbs
—	MF	ENG	Ste Irwin
—	MF	ENG	Sean Miller
—	FW	ENG	Luke Wall
—	FW	ENG	Elliot Morris
—	FW	ENG	Lewis Buckley

== Non-playing staff ==
Updated 31 May 2026.

Name	Role
Peter Cartledge	Chairman
Jeff Jago	Vice-chairman
Paul Eastup	Club Secretary
David Bettley	Trust Secretary
Jacques Welsh and Peter Wylie	First Team Managers
Chris Lawton	First Team Assistant Manager
Ryan Brookfield	First Team Goalkeeper Coach
Lee Bignall	First Team Coach
Darren Berrill	Head Of Medical
Daniel Jago	Kit Manager
Ron Corn	Mascot

== Attendances ==
=== League averages ===
Past averages:

- 2025-26: 653
- 2024-25: 533
- 2023–24: 701
- 2022–23: 640
- 2021–22: 732
- 2020–21: 275 Season Curtailed Due To COVID-19 pandemic.
- 2019–20: 346 Season Curtailed Due To COVID-19 pandemic.
- 2018–19: 393
- 2017–18: 387
- 2016–17: 332
- 2015–16: 324
- 2014–15: 363
- 2013–14: 323
- 2012–13: 244
- 2011–12: 276
- 2010–11: 284
- 2009–10: 138
- 2008–09: 136
- 2007–08: 170
- 2006–07: 200

Source: Tony Kempster's site Non-League Matters NW Counties Football League site

== League history ==
Updated 26 April 2026.

Key to league record

- Pld = Games played
- W = Games won
- D = Games drawn
- L = Games lost
- F = Goals for
- A = Goals against
- Pts = Points
- Pos = Position in the final league table

League
Joined the North West Counties Football League in 2006
Year	League	Pld	W	D	L	F	A	Pts	Pos	Significant Events	Top Scorer (League)
2006–07	NW Counties Division Two	34	24	4	6	77	35	76	2nd	Promoted	
2007–08	NW Counties Division One	38	14	6	18	53	64	48	12th		
2007–08	NW Counties Division One	League Renamed to Premier Division									
2008–09	NW Counties Premier Division	42	16	7	19	64	84	55	11th		
2009–10	NW Counties Premier Division	42	17	6	19	75	78	57	11th		
2010–11	NW Counties Premier Division	42	16	8	18	68	77	56	12th		
2011–12	NW Counties Premier Division	42	22	10	10	70	62	76	5th		Rob Whyte – 15
2012–13	NW Counties Premier Division	42	21	9	12	82	58	72	6th	NWCFL League Cup: Winners: 2012–13	Ross McDowell – 14
2013–14	NW Counties Premier Division	42	29	8	5	103	39	95	2nd		Antony Hickey – 19
2014–15	NW Counties Premier Division	40	28	8	4	89	39	92	2nd		Kevin Towey – 18
2015–16	NW Counties Premier Division	42	32	2	8	97	35	98	2nd		Kyle Hamid – 19
2016–17	NW Counties Premier Division	42	27	9	6	105	45	90	4th		Mark Houghton – 22
2017–18	NW Counties Premier Division	44	31	7	6	122	36	100	1st	NWCFL Premier Division: Champions: 2017–18	Freddie Potter – 24
2018–19	Northern Premier League	38	22	6	10	68	50	72	6th		Freddie Potter – 8
2018–19	Northern Premier League	League Renamed to North West Division									
2019–20	Northern Premier League	27	10	8	9	41	40	38	9th	Season Curtailed Due To COVID-19 pandemic.	Louis Corrigan – 7
2020–21	Northern Premier League	8	4	3	1	15	11	15	8th	Season Curtailed Due To COVID-19 pandemic.	Craig Linfield – 4
2020–21	Northern Premier League	League Renamed to West Division									
2021–22	Northern Premier League	38	23	7	8	72	39	76	4th	Lost in play-off final	Ryan Brooke - 28
2022–23	Northern Premier League	38	18	9	11	58	38	63	5th	Lost in play-off final	Jamie Rainford - 14
2023–24	Northern Premier League	38	20	8	10	63	39	68	2nd	Lost in play-off semi-final	Oliver Molloy - 15
2024–25	Northern Premier League	42	17	10	15	54	70	61	11th	Cheshire Senior Cup: Winners: 2024-25	Ryan Brooke - 11
2025-26	Northern Premier League	42	23	11	8	76	45	80	4th	Lost in play-off semi-final	Scott Bakkor - 16

Source: FCHD Football Web Pages RLFC

== FA competition history ==
Updated 4 October 2025.

Season	FA Cup	FA Trophy	FA Vase
2006–07	–	–	–
2007–08	–	–	R1
2008–09	PRE	–	R3
2009–10	PRE	–	2Q
2010–11	PRE	–	R1
2011–12	2Q	–	R1
2012–13	EPr	–	R1
2013–14	3Q	–	R1
2014–15	PRE	–	R1
2015–16	1Q	–	R2
2016–17	EP	–	R1
2017–18	PRE	–	R3
2018–19	PRE	EP	–
2019–20	PRE	3Q	–
2020–21	2Q	R1	–
2021–22	3Q	3Q	–
2022–23	1Q	R2	–
2023–24	2Qr	1Q	–
2024-25	PREr	1Q	-
2025-26	4Q	3Q	-

== Managerial history ==
Updated 13 May 2025.

Name	From	To	Honours
Steve Carragher	2006	2008	
Steve Wilkes	2008	2010	
Paul McNally	2010	2012	
Joey Dunn	2012	2016	NWCFL League Cup: Winners: 2012–13
Michael Ellison	2016	2020	NWCFL Premier Division: Champions: 2017–18
Calum McIntyre	2020	2022	
Dave Wild	2022	2023	
Billy Paynter	2023	2024	
Antony Kay	2024	2025	
Brad Cooke	2025	2026	Cheshire Senior Cup Winners: 2024-25
Michael Ellison	2026	2026	
