= Trafford F.C. =

Association football club in Greater Manchester, England

Trafford
- Full name: Trafford Football Club
- Nickname: The North
- Founded: 1990
- Ground: Shawe View, Flixton
- Capacity: 2,500
- Chairman: John Eadie
- Manager: Tom Baker
- League: North West Counties League Premier Division
- 2025–26: Northern Premier League Division One West, 21st of 22 (relegated)
Home colours	Away colours

Trafford Football Club is an English football club based in Flixton, near Urmston in the Metropolitan Borough of Trafford, in Greater Manchester. The club are currently members of the Northern Premier League Division One West and play at the Away Day Care Shawe View Stadium.

== History ==
The club was established in 1990 as North Trafford, founded by David Brown, John Harrison, David Law, and Bill Whitten. They applied to join Mid-Cheshire League and despite being initially rejected, were admitted to Division Two after a late withdrawal. They finished as runners-up in their first season, and were promoted to Division One. The following season they finished fourth and moved up to Division Two of the North West Counties League. In 1993–94 they finished second and were promoted to Division One, at which point they adopted their current name.

In 1996–97 they won Division One and were promoted to Division One of the Northern Premier League. In 1999–00 they won the President's Cup, but in 2002–03 they finished bottom of the division and were relegated back to the North West Counties League. They won the league again in 2007–08 and were promoted back to the Northern Premier League. In their first season back in the league they won the President's Cup for a second time.

== Ground ==
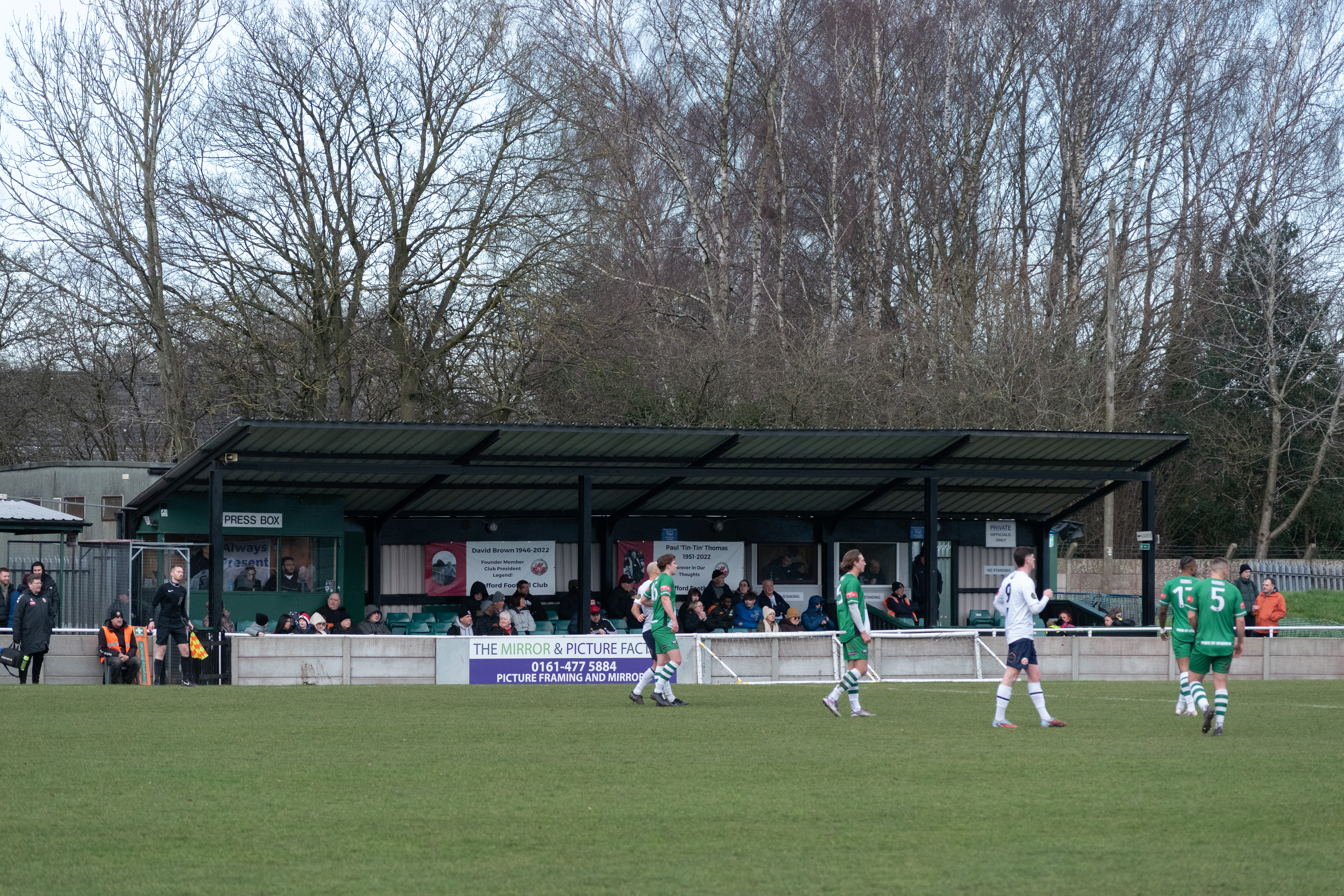
Main stand at Shawe View

Trafford have played at Shawe View in Urmston since their formation, initially sharing the ground with Trafford Borough Rugby League Club but soon gaining sole tenancy and a 30-year lease. Floodlights and a stand were built in 1993.

== Honours ==
- Northern Premier League
  - President's Cup winners 1999–00, 2008–09
  - First Division Cup winners 1997–98
  - League Cup winners 2018–19
- North West Counties League
  - Division One champions 1996–97, 2007–08

== Records ==
- FA Cup
  - Third Qualifying Round 2006–07, 2012–13, 2013–14, 2026–27
- FA Trophy
  - Third Round 2000–01
- FA Vase
  - Fifth Round 1995–96
