= Valerie Park =

Sports stadium in Prescot, England

Coordinates: 53°25′55″N 2°48′17″W

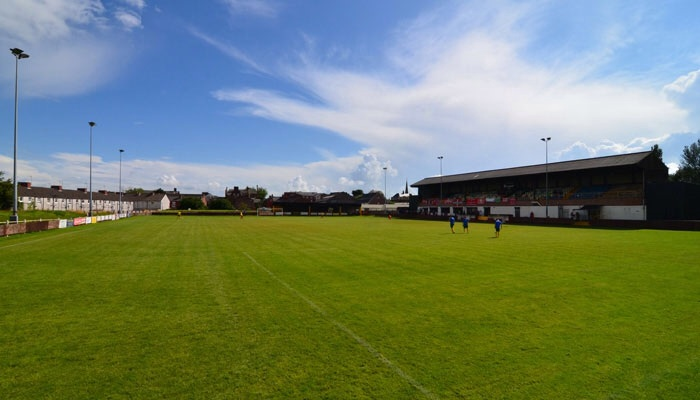
IP Truck Parts Stadium

The Joseph Russell Stadium, traditionally known as Hope Street, is a stadium in Prescot, Merseyside. It is located on Eaton Street in the Metropolitan Borough of Knowsley. It is home to Prescot Cables of the Northern Premier League. A.F.C. Liverpool of the North West Counties Football League shared the ground from 2008 until 2014. Skelmersdale United shared the ground in the 2018/19 Northern Premier League season.

At the start of the 2016–17 season the ground was renamed Volair Park following on from the signing of a 3-year grounds rights deal with local leisure services provider Volair. The club were granted a 99-year lease from Knowsley council in 2019. In November 2019 the club signed a stadium rights deal with IP Truck Parts, as part of the deal the stadium for the 2019 season will be known as the IP Truck Parts Stadium. Located about just over half a mile from Prescot railway station, the capacity is 2,070.

== History ==
The ground was opened in 1906. Prescot Panthers, a rugby league club, also played their matches at Hope Street between 1996 and 1997. The record attendance is 8,122.

== Ground structure ==
The ground has a stand with a function room that is also hired out for events and seating above it. It also has a terraced shed stand at the Hope Street end of the stadium and 2 sides are not built on.
