= 2004–05 FA Cup qualifying rounds =

Tournament details
- Country: England; Wales

The 2004–05 FA Cup qualifying rounds opened the 124th season of competition in England for 'The Football Association Challenge Cup' (FA Cup), the world's oldest association football single knockout competition. A total of 661 clubs were accepted for the competition, up 17 from the previous season’s 644.

The large number of clubs entering the tournament from lower down (Levels 5 through 11) in the English football pyramid meant that the competition started with six rounds of preliminary (2) and qualifying (4) knockouts for these non-League teams. South Western Football League was the only level 11 league represented in the Cup, five clubs from the South Western Football League were the lowest-ranked clubs in competition. The 32 winning teams from Fourth qualifying round progressed to the First round proper, where League teams tiered at Levels 3 and 4 entered the competition.

== Calendar ==
Round	Start date	Leagues entering at this round	New entries this round	Winners from previous round	Number of fixtures	Prize money
Extra preliminary round	28 August 2004	Levels 9-11	146	none	73	£500
Preliminary round	4 September 2004	Level 8	291	73	182	£1,000
First qualifying round	18 September 2004	Level 7	66	182	124	£2,250
Second qualifying round	2 October 2004	Conference North; Conference South	44	124	84	£3,750
Third qualifying round	16 October 2004	none	none	84	42	£5,000
Fourth qualifying round	30 October 2004	Conference Premier	22	42	32	£10,000

== Extra preliminary round ==
Matches played on Saturday/Sunday 28 to 29 August 2004. 146 clubs from Level 9, Level 10 and Level 11 of English football, entered at this stage of the competition, while other 203 clubs from levels 9-11 get a bye to the preliminary round.

Tie	Home team (tier)	Score	Away team (tier)	Att.
1	Hebburn Town (10)	1–4	Silsden (10)	140
2	Maine Road (10)	3–2	Durham City (9)	90
3	Skelmersdale United (9)	3–1	Brodsworth Miners Welfare (9)	75
4	Newcastle Blue Star (10)	1–4	Liversedge (9)	
5	Winterton Rangers (10)	1–1	Goole (9)	135
replay	Goole (9)	1–0	Winterton Rangers (10)	188
6	Curzon Ashton (9)	1–3	Morpeth Town (9)	78
7	Norton & Stockton Ancients (10)	1–0	Yorkshire Amateur (10)	230
8	Tadcaster Albion (10)	2–5	Fleetwood Town (9)	114
9	Rossington Main (10)	1–2	Washington Nissan (10)	63
10	Nelson (10)	0–1	Chester-le-Street Town (9)	130
11	St Helens Town (9)	4–3	Newcastle Benfield Saints (9)	100
12	Peterlee Newtown (9)	1–1	Colne (9)	33
replay	Colne (9)	2–0	Peterlee Newtown (9)	117
13	Parkgate (10)	3–1	Kennek Ryhope CA (10)	55
14	Holbeach United (9)	0–1	Alvechurch (9)	80
15	Barwell (9)	1–0	Oldbury United (9)	72
16	Cradley Town (9)	0–4	Chasetown (9)	68
17	Biddulph Victoria (9)	3–1	Staveley Miners Welfare (10)	140
18	Causeway United (9)	4–3	Leek CSOB (10)	124
19	Boldmere St Michaels (9)	1–3	Norton United (10)	59
20	Coalville Town (9)	3–0	Daventry Town (9)	68
21	Lowestoft Town (9)	8–0	AFC Wallingford (9)	190
22	Woodbridge Town (9)	2–0	Ware (9)	110
23	Concord Rangers (9)	1–3	Ilford (9)	38
24	Norwich United (9)	2–0	Harefield United (9)	52
25	North Greenford United (9)	3–3	Clapton (9)	68
replay	Clapton (9)	0–1	North Greenford United (9)	106
26	Chalfont St Peter (9)	2–10	Wroxham (9)	46
27	Great Yarmouth Town (9)	1–1	Long Melford (10)	91
replay	Long Melford (10)	2–1	Great Yarmouth Town (9)	87
28	Bury Town (9)	6–1	Hullbridge Sports (9)	163
29	Tiptree United (10)	2–2	Ruislip Manor (9)	52
replay	Ruislip Manor (9)	6–2	Tiptree United (10)	96
30	Witham Town (9)	0–1	Dereham Town (9)	117
31	Enfield Town (9)	0–0	Leverstock Green (9)	263
replay	Leverstock Green (9)	1–3	Enfield Town (9)	120
32	Wembley (9)	0–2	Edgware Town (9)	66
33	Hanwell Town (9)	6–1	Hadleigh United (10)	69
34	Royston Town (9)	3–0	Harpenden Town (9)	62
35	Bowers & Pitsea (9)	0–0	London Colney (9)	35
replay	London Colney (9)	7–5	Bowers & Pitsea (9)	45
36	AFC Sudbury (9)	5–1	Haringey Borough (9)	245
37	Ely City (10)	1–2	Brook House (9)	87
38	Felixstowe & Walton United (10)	1–1	Leiston (9)	127
replay	Leiston (9)	4–1	Felixstowe & Walton United (10)	151

Tie	Home team (tier)	Score	Away team (tier)	Att.
39	Wisbech Town (9)	0–1	Sawbridgeworth Town (9)	257
40	Enfield (9)	5–3	March Town United (10)	138
41	Buckingham Town (9)	4–2	Kingsbury Town (9)	93
42	Ipswich Wanderers (10)	6–1	St Neots Town (9)	78
43	Haverhill Rovers (10)	5–0	Needham Market (9)	106
44	Potters Bar Town (9)	0–0	Clacton Town (9)	74
replay	Clacton Town (9)	0–1	Potters Bar Town (9)	160
45	Newmarket Town (9)	1–1	Ford Sports Daventry (9)	99
replay	Ford Sports Daventry (9)	2–1	Newmarket Town (9)	
46	Cove (9)	0–2	Fareham Town (9)	60
47	VCD Athletic (9)	2–0	Godalming & Guildford (9)	91
48	Camberley Town (9)	1–0	Thatcham Town (9)	87
49	Lordswood (9)	1–4	Winchester City (9)	134
50	Chessington United (9)	3–3	Chichester City United (9)	40
replay	Chichester City United (9)	5–0	Chessington United (9)	95
51	Walton Casuals (9)	2–0	Three Bridges (9)	94
52	Hythe Town (9)	1–1	Littlehampton Town (9)	161
replay	Littlehampton Town (9)	3–2	Hythe Town (9)	141
53	Wick (10)	2–0	Saltdean United (10)	
54	Broadbridge Heath (10)	0–2	Brockenhurst (9)	163
55	Selsey (10)	1–2	Merstham (9)	105
56	Moneyfields (9)	4–1	Redhill (9)	168
57	Arundel (9)	1–3	Whitstable Town (9)	90
58	Greenwich Borough (9)	6–3	Eastbourne United Association (9)	53
Greenwich Borough fielded ineligible player, therefore the winners of the match were Eastbourne United Association
59	Whitehawk (9)	1–1	AFC Totton (9)	78
replay	AFC Totton (9)	4–4 (5–4 p)	Whitehawk (9)	110
60	Slade Green (9)	0–0	Reading Town (9)	75
replay	Reading Town (9)	2–1	Slade Green (9)	52
61	Bishop Sutton (9)	1–1	Frome Town (9)	87
replay	Frome Town (9)	1–0	Bishop Sutton (9)	176
62	Hamworthy United (9)	1–0	Liskeard Athletic (11)	173
63	Willand Rovers (10)	1–4	St Blazey (11)	202
64	Highworth Town (9)	2–1	Falmouth Town (11)	192
65	Devizes Town (9)	1–4	Exmouth Town (9)	62
66	Street (10)	4–2	Welton Rovers (9)	116
67	Bristol Manor Farm (9)	2–3	Bridport (9)	35
68	Bishop's Cleeve (9)	7–0	Minehead Town (10)	106
69	Tuffley Rovers (9)	0–3	Barnstaple Town (9)	42
70	Portland United (9)	0–3	Bridgwater Town (9)	180
71	Keynsham Town (9)	0–1	Saltash United (10)	52
72	Downton (9)	0–1	Porthleven (11)	70
73	Backwell United (9)	3–2	Odd Down (9)	26

== Preliminary round ==
Matches played on weekend of Saturday 4 September 2004. A total of 364 clubs took part in this stage of the competition, including the 73 winners from the extra preliminary round, 203 clubs from Levels 9-11, who get a bye in the extra preliminary round and 88 entering at this stage from the four divisions at Level 8 of English football. The round featured three clubs from Level 11 (all from the South Western Football League) still in the competition, being the lowest ranked clubs in this round.

Tie	Home team (tier)	Score	Away team (tier)	Att.
1	Warrington Town (8)	3–0	Pontefract Collieries (10)	132
2	South Shields (10)	3–5	Blackpool Mechanics (10)	104
3	Flixton (10)	5–2	Parkgate (10)	49
4	Willington (10)	0–9	Woodley Sports (8)	40
5	Maltby Main (9)	7–1	Penrith (10)	75
6	Abbey Hey (9)	0–1	Squires Gate (9)	52
7	Holker Old Boys (10)	2–0	Hall Road Rangers (10)	183
8	North Shields (10)	0–1	Ashington (9)	156
9	Consett (9)	1–1	Crook Town (10)	91
replay	Crook Town (10)	3–1	Consett (9)	128
10	Atherton Collieries (9)	1–2	Alsager Town (9)	68
11	Jarrow Roofing BCA (9)	1–1	Retford United (10)	84
replay	Retford United (10)	1–0	Jarrow Roofing BCA (9)	164
12	Prudhoe Town (10)	0–1	Sheffield (9)	50
13	Chadderton (10)	2–1	Norton & Stockton Ancients (10)	121
14	Northallerton Town (10)	1–1	Billingham Town (9)	109
replay	Billingham Town (9)	1–0	Northallerton Town (10)	162
15	Marske United (10)	0–1	Colwyn Bay (8)	111
16	Harrogate Railway Athletic (9)	1–1	Esh Winning (9)	117
replay	Esh Winning (9)	7–3	Harrogate Railway Athletic (9)	98
17	Pickering Town (9)	1–0	Bedlington Terriers (9)	139
18	Padiham (10)	1–5	Billingham Synthonia (9)	288
19	Silsden (10)	1–1	Hallam (9)	315
replay	Hallam (9)	1–3	Silsden (10)	110
20	Clitheroe (8)	6–1	Tow Law Town (9)	227
21	St Helens Town (9)	0–3	West Auckland Town (9)	106
22	Kendal Town (8)	4–1	Eccleshill United (9)	115
23	Bacup Borough (9)	0–3	Chorley (8)	92
24	Cheadle Town (10)	0–3	Maine Road (9)	89
25	Horden Colliery Welfare (9)	1–0	AFC Telford United (8)	192
26	Armthorpe Welfare (9)	1–1	Thackley (9)	47
replay	Thackley (9)	1–4	Armthorpe Welfare (9)	127
27	Ossett Albion (8)	0–0	Washington (10)	107
replay	Washington (10)	0–1	Ossett Albion (8)	56
28	Great Harwood Town (9)	0–2	Glasshoughton Welfare (9)	79
29	Seaham Red Star (10)	3–3	Whickham (10)	54
replay	Whickham (10)	4–0	Seaham Red Star (10)	76
30	Guisborough Town (9)	1–3	Brigg Town (8)	84
31	Cammell Laird (10)	2–0	Goole (9)	193
32	Mossley (8)	3–0	Selby Town (9)	238
33	Thornaby (9)	2–1	Easington Colliery (10)	75
34	Fleetwood Town (9)	6–0	Alnwick Town (10)	171
35	Chester-le-Street Town (9)	0–2	Colne (9)	75
36	Ramsbottom United (9)	3–0	Evenwood Town (10)	131
37	Darwen (10)	0–0	Brandon United (9)	88
replay	Brandon United (9)	4–1	Darwen (10)	61
38	Washington Nissan (10)	1–1	Dunston Federation Brewery (9)	39
replay	Dunston Federation Brewery (9)	4–1	Washington Nissan (10)	142
39	Shildon (9)	2–0	Garforth Town (10)	217
40	Oldham Town (10)	0–0	Atherton Laburnum Rovers (9)	51
replay	Atherton Laburnum Rovers (9)	1–0	Oldham Town (10)	90
41	Trafford (9)	4–2	North Ferriby United (8)	160
42	Whitley Bay (9)	3–1	Salford City (9)	208
43	Rossendale United (8)	1–4	Liversedge (9)	142
44	Winsford United (10)	2–1	Morpeth Town (9)	
45	Skelmersdale United (9)	1–1	Stocksbridge Park Steels (8)	122
replay	Stocksbridge Park Steels (8)	0–2	Skelmersdale United (9)	123
46	Shepshed Dynamo (8)	3–2	Racing Club Warwick (9)	147
47	Congleton Town (9)	0–1	Carlton Town (10)	171
48	Causeway United (9)	1–1	Lincoln Moorlands (10)	42
replay	Lincoln Moorlands (10)	0–3	Causeway United (9)	48
49	Eastwood Town (8)	1–2	Willenhall Town (8)	159
50	Gedling Town (10)	0–3	Coalville Town (9)	39
51	Stourbridge (9)	1–3	Norton United (10)	179
52	Glossop North End (9)	2–3	Ludlow Town (9)	105
53	Stratford Town (9)	2–1	Mickleover Sports (9)	148
54	Bedworth United (8)	2–0	Quorn (9)	148
55	Long Eaton United (9)	0–3	Spalding United (8)	98
56	Boston Town (9)	1–2	Stone Dominoes (9)	48
57	Chasetown (9)	2–2	Belper Town (8)	140
replay	Belper Town (8)	2–0	Chasetown (9)	167
58	Borrowash Victoria (9)	1–0	Biddulph Victoria (9)	52
59	Arnold Town (9)	1–4	Rocester (8)	188
60	Kidsgrove Athletic (8)	1–4	Newcastle Town (9)	281
61	Rushall Olympic (9)	3–0	Bourne Town (9)	71
62	Blackstones (9)	1–2	Barwell (9)	70
63	Sutton Coldfield Town (8)	1–0	Nantwich Town (9)	88
64	Buxton (9)	1–1	Stourport Swifts (8)	364
replay	Stourport Swifts (8)	1–1 (6–5 p)	Buxton (9)	125
65	Sutton Town (10)	2–1	Oadby Town (9)	254
66	Shirebrook Town (9)	3–1	Bromsgrove Rovers (8)	305
67	Alvechurch (9)	1–3	Ilkeston Town (8)	105
68	Gresley Rovers (8)	1–0	Studley (9)	252
69	Corby Town (8)	1–2	Westfields (9)	106
70	Deeping Rangers (9)	2–0	Glapwell (9)	161
71	Cogenhoe United (9)	7–0	Woodford United (9)	84
72	Soham Town Rangers (9)	1–0	Leighton Town (8)	126
73	Sawbridgeworth Town (9)	0–3	Haverhill Rovers (10)	84
74	Rothwell Town (8)	2–3	Berkhamsted Town (8)	93
75	Enfield Town (9)	2–1	AFC Sudbury (9)	391
76	Royston Town (9)	0–5	Barkingside (9)	82
77	Brackley Town (8)	5–2	Stowmarket Town (9)	124
78	Fakenham Town (10)	2–3	Gorleston (9)	105
79	Enfield (9)	1–0	Long Buckby (9)	98
80	Great Wakering Rovers (8)	1–1	Maldon Town (8)	140
replay	Maldon Town (8)	3–1	Great Wakering Rovers (8)	200
81	London Colney (9)	2–2	St Margaretsbury (9)	50
replay	St Margaretsbury (9)	2–1	London Colney (9)	68
82	East Thurrock United (8)	3–3	Halstead Town (9)	104
replay	Halstead Town (9)	1–0	East Thurrock United (8)	189
83	Bedford United & Valerio (9)	0–3	Potton United (9)	54
84	Ford Sports Daventry (9)	1–1	Southend Manor (9)	35
replay	Southend Manor (9)	3–1	Ford Sports Daventry (9)	54
85	Long Melford (10)	1–0	Woodbridge Town (9)	115
86	Stanway Rovers (10)	0–3	Boreham Wood (8)	110
87	Desborough Town (9)	1–4	North Greenford United (9)	85

Tie	Home team (tier)	Score	Away team (tier)	Att.
88	Potters Bar Town (9)	1–7	Uxbridge (8)	71
89	Flackwell Heath (9)	2–2	Hanwell Town (9)	96
replay	Hanwell Town (9)	2–3	Flackwell Heath (9)	94
90	Brook House (9)	4–0	Romford (9)	89
91	Norwich United (9)	0–1	Thame United (8)	46
92	Wroxham (9)	0–1	Beaconsfield SYCOB (8)	123
93	Holmer Green (9)	2–1	Newport Pagnell Town (9)	51
94	Diss Town (9)	0–2	Barking & East Ham United (8)	260
95	Burnham Ramblers (9)	0–3	Waltham Forest (8)	81
96	Harlow Town (8)	3–1	Buckingham Town (9)	86
97	Harwich & Parkeston (9)	3–2	Stansted (9)	148
98	Arlesey Town (8)	3–0	Godmanchester Rovers (10)	160
99	Yaxley (9)	1–2	Stotfold (9)	62
100	Raunds Town (9)	1–1	Hertford Town (9)	94
replay	Hertford Town (9)	1–0	Raunds Town (9)	142
101	Hoddesdon Town (9)	1–10	Barton Rovers (8)	71
102	Ruislip Manor (9)	1–1	Henley Town (9)	82
replay	Henley Town (9)	0–1	Ruislip Manor (9)	84
103	Lowestoft Town (9)	7–1	Northampton Spencer (9)	240
104	Leiston (9)	0–2	Tilbury (8)	171
105	Wingate & Finchley (8)	4–1	Fleet Town (8)	119
106	Dereham Town (9)	0–2	Marlow (8)	124
107	Eton Manor (9)	1–3	Cornard United (10)	16
108	Ilford (9)	0–1	Wivenhoe Town (8)	110
109	Mildenhall Town (9)	1–1	Aveley (8)	134
replay	Aveley (8)	3–0	Mildenhall Town (9)	69
110	Wootton Blue Cross (9)	1–0	Broxbourne Borough V&E (9)	58
111	Edgware Town (9)	1–0	Ipswich Wanderers (10)	190
112	Bury Town (9)	2–0	Brentwood Town (9)	142
113	Hungerford Town (9)	1–2	Dorking (8)	80
114	Frimley Green (9)	1–2	Raynes Park Vale (9)	40
115	Lymington & New Milton (9)	1–1	Sittingbourne (8)	90
replay	Sittingbourne (8)	1–2	Lymington & New Milton (9)	129
116	Molesey (8)	5–0	Westfield (9)	55
117	Walton & Hersham (8)	1–2	Leatherhead (8)	156
118	Hastings United (8)	3–1	Croydon (8)	326
119	Pagham (9)	1–2	Tunbridge Wells (9)	
120	Ramsgate (9)	7–0	Lancing (10)	126
121	Newport (Isle of Wight) (8)	0–0	Walton Casuals (9)	145
replay	Walton Casuals (9)	1–1 (4–1 p)	Newport (Isle of Wight) (8)	150
122	Horsham (8)	3–0	Chipstead (9)	364
123	Hillingdon Borough (9)	0–1	Ashford Town (Middx) (8)	72
124	Moneyfields (9)	0–5	Tooting & Mitcham United (8)	128
125	Metropolitan Police (8)	4–3	Alton Town (9)	74
126	Bedfont (9)	0–3	Bracknell Town (8)	95
127	Herne Bay (9)	1–2	Gosport Borough (9)	179
128	Oxford City (8)	7–0	Abingdon Town (9)	220
129	Rye & Iden United (9)	0–0	East Preston (9)	83
replay	East Preston (9)	3–1	Rye & Iden United (9)	118
130	Cobham (9)	0–3	Hailsham Town (9)	53
131	Fisher Athletic (8)	5–0	Eastbourne Town (9)	148
132	North Leigh (9)	3–1	Deal Town (9)	62
133	Sandhurst Town (9)	4–2	Southwick (9)	77
134	Cray Wanderers (8)	4–0	Epsom & Ewell (9)	
135	Whyteleafe (8)	2–4	Erith & Belvedere (8)	151
136	AFC Wimbledon (8)	3–0	Ashford Town (Kent)	2,696
137	Hartley Wintney (9)	1–2	Ash United (9)	212
138	Croydon Athletic (8)	5–0	Farnham Town (9)	116
139	Burgess Hill Town (8)	1–2	Brockenhurst (9)	212
140	Dartford (8)	5–0	Horsham YMCA (9)	287
141	Wantage Town (9)	1–2	Carterton Town (9)	92
142	Peacehaven & Telscombe (10)	1–3	AFC Totton (9)	47
143	Abingdon United (9)	2–1	Cowes Sports (9)	66
144	Whitstable Town (9)	6–0	Wick (10)	153
145	Bashley (8)	2–1	Camberley Town (9)	127
146	Hassocks (9)	1–3	Merstham (9)	153
147	Sidlesham (9)	0–5	Didcot Town (9)	51
148	Maidstone United (9)	3–1	Chichester City United (9)	259
149	Thamesmead Town (9)	1–0	Eastbourne United Association (9)	63
150	Chatham Town (8)	1–1	Reading Town (9)	116
replay	Reading Town (9)	2–3	Chatham Town (8)	68
151	Banstead Athletic (8)	3–1	Littlehampton Town (9)	86
152	Corinthian-Casuals (8)	0–3	Winchester City (9)	110
153	BAT Sports (9)	3–0	Egham Town (8)	69
154	Ringmer (9)	3–2	Andover (9)	91
155	Erith Town (9)	5–3	Steyning Town (10)	59
156	AFC Newbury (9)	3–0	East Grinstead Town (9)	108
157	Dulwich Hamlet (8)	2–1	Burnham (8)	209
158	Chessington & Hook United (9)	0–1	Bromley (8)	195
159	Mile Oak (10)	1–0	Fareham Town (9)	97
160	VCD Athletic (9)	5–1	Chertsey Town (9)	56
161	Evesham United (8)	3–1	Saltash United (10)	101
162	Bournemouth (9)	3–2	Shepton Mallet (10)	71
163	Backwell United (9)	2–1	Bridgwater Town (9)	83
164	Wimborne Town (9)	1–2	Yate Town (8)	176
165	Swindon Supermarine (8)	1–0	Calne Town (10)	106
166	Paulton Rovers (8)	0–1	St Blazey (11)	229
167	Bitton (9)	2–0	Hamworthy United (9)	83
168	Exmouth Town (9)	3–2	Wootton Bassett Town (9)	140
169	Torrington (9)	0–3	Barnstaple Town (9)	126
170	Dawlish Town (10)	0–2	Corsham Town (9)	64
171	Bridport (9)	1–1	Chard Town (10)	148
replay	Chard Town (10)	0–1	Bridport (9)	173
172	Hallen (9)	2–0	Melksham Town (9)	44
173	Bodmin Town (11)	4–0	Clevedon United (10)	154
174	Bemerton Heath Harlequins (9)	3–1	Westbury United (10)	54
175	Brislington (9)	0–1	Bishop's Cleeve (9)	50
176	Taunton Town (8)	2–3	Frome Town (9)	261
177	Christchurch (9)	1–2	Clevedon Town (8)	67
178	Highworth Town (9)	6–0	Elmore (10)	145
179	Porthleven (11)	1–6	Bideford (9)	126
180	Mangotsfield United (8)	3–2	Shortwood United (9)	186
181	Cinderford Town (8)	1–1	Street (10)	116
replay	Street (10)	2–1	Cinderford Town (8)	148
182	Fairford Town (9)	4–0	Almondsbury Town (9)	58

== First qualifying round ==
Matches on weekend of Saturday 18 September 2004. A total of 248 clubs took part in this stage of the competition, including the 182 winners from the Preliminary round and 66 entering at this stage from the top division of the three leagues at Level 7 of English football. Bodmin Town and St Blazey from the South Western Football League at Level 11 of English football were the lowest-ranked clubs to qualify for this round of the competition.

Tie	Home team (tier)	Score	Away team (tier)	Att.
1	Frickley Athletic (7)	4–1	Chadderton (10)	245
2	Billingham Synthonia (9)	1–3	Whitby Town (7)	247
3	Clitheroe (8)	2–2	Wakefield-Emley (7)	246
replay	Wakefield-Emley (7)	0–0 (2–4 p)	Clitheroe (8)	108
4	Billingham Town (9)	1–0	Ossett Town (7)	76
5	Marine (7)	1–1	Farsley Celtic (7)	250
replay	Farsley Celtic (7)	4–0	Marine (7)	142
6	Bridlington Town (7)	1–5	Cammell Laird (10)	201
7	Flixton (10)	1–6	Dunston Federation Brewery (9)	78
8	Hyde United (7)	3–0	Maine Road (9)	327
9	West Auckland Town (9)	0–2	Ashington (9)	76
10	Thornaby (9)	1–2	Esh Winning (9)	55
11	Colne (9)	2–1	Sheffield (9)	207
12	Guiseley (7)	0–0	Chorley (8)	242
replay	Chorley (8)	2–1	Guiseley (7)	187
13	Witton Albion (7)	0–1	Winsford United (10)	348
14	Burscough (7)	1–0	Retford United (10)	218
15	Alsager Town (9)	0–1	Radcliffe Borough (7)	112
16	Atherton Laburnum Rovers (9)	3–0	Whickham (10)	90
17	Gateshead (7)	2–0	Pickering Town (9)	207
18	Ramsbottom United (9)	2–1	Colwyn Bay (8)	208
19	Brigg Town (8)	3–1	Whitley Bay (9)	201
20	Brandon United (9)	1–4	Liversedge (9)	68
21	Bishop Auckland (7)	1–2	Workington (7)	232
22	Kendal Town (8)	1–1	Prescot Cables (7)	153
replay	Prescot Cables (7)	5–2	Kendal Town (8)	163
23	Crook Town (10)	1–3	Glasshoughton Welfare (9)	163
24	Spennymoor United (7)	1–1	Fleetwood Town (9)	174
replay	Fleetwood Town (9)	3–2	Spennymoor United (7)	176
25	Horden Colliery Welfare (9)	1–1	Warrington Town (8)	77
replay	Warrington Town (8)	1–2	Horden Colliery Welfare (9)	124
26	Mossley (8)	3–2	Ossett Albion (8)	325
27	Armthorpe Welfare (9)	1–2	Maltby Main (9)	80
28	Bamber Bridge (7)	6–0	Blackpool Mechanics (10)	156
29	Shildon (9)	1–1	Woodley Sports (8)	225
replay	Woodley Sports (8)	0–2	Shildon (9)	123
30	Blyth Spartans (7)	0–2	Skelmersdale United (9)	429
31	Holker Old Boys (10)	2–2	Silsden (10)	218
replay	Silsden (10)	1–2	Holker Old Boys (10)	525
32	Trafford (9)	1–2	Squires Gate (9)	161
33	Westfields (9)	1–2	Carlton Town (10)	103
34	Ludlow Town (9)	5–1	Newcastle Town (9)	146
35	Matlock Town (7)	2–1	Shirebrook Town (9)	395
36	Grantham Town (7)	2–4	Shepshed Dynamo (8)	320
37	Rugby United (7)	2–2	Hednesford Town (7)	358
replay	Hednesford Town (7)	2–1	Rugby United (7)	456
38	Ilkeston Town (8)	0–3	Gresley Rovers (8)	502
39	Spalding United (8)	4–0	Causeway United (9)	159
40	Solihull Borough (7)	0–1	Leek Town (7)	227
41	Sutton Town (10)	1–1	Stone Dominoes (9)	135
replay	Stone Dominoes (9)	3–0	Sutton Town (10)	59
42	Stamford (7)	1–0	Bedworth United (8)	238
43	Borrowash Victoria (9)	0–5	Halesowen Town (7)	155
44	Norton United (10)	0–1	Lincoln United (7)	78
45	Deeping Rangers (9)	2–2	Coalville Town (9)	154
replay	Coalville Town (9)	3–1	Deeping Rangers (9)	130
46	Sutton Coldfield Town (8)	2–1	Stratford Town (9)	119
Sutton Coldfield Town played ineligible player, therefore the winners of the match were Stratford Town
47	Willenhall Town (8)	1–0	Barwell (9)	163
48	Belper Town (8)	2–0	Rocester (8)	228
49	Stourport Swifts (8)	1–2	Rushall Olympic (9)	107
50	Harrow Borough (7)	2–0	Potton United (9)	131
51	Uxbridge (8)	4–3	Staines Town (7)	163
52	Brook House (9)	1–1	Northwood (7)	122
replay	Northwood (7)	3–0	Brook House (9)	172
53	Southend Manor (9)	0–3	Billericay Town (7)	232
54	Histon (7)	2–0	Hampton & Richmond Borough (7)	228
55	Cheshunt (7)	2–2	Barton Rovers (8)	98
replay	Barton Rovers (8)	3–4	Cheshunt (7)	92
56	Haverhill Rovers (10)	0–1	Wivenhoe Town (8)	232
57	Heybridge Swifts (7)	1–0	Barking & East Ham United (8)	213
58	Thame United (8)	3–3	Gorleston (9)	103
replay	Gorleston (9)	3–5	Thame United (8)	41
59	Lowestoft Town (9)	0–1	Boreham Wood (8)	325
60	Wingate & Finchley (8)	2–3	Halstead Town (9)	100
61	Hendon (7)	1–0	Holmer Green (9)	145

Tie	Home team (tier)	Score	Away team (tier)	Att.
62	Wealdstone (7)	2–1	Banbury United (7)	266
63	Dunstable Town (7)	5–0	St Margaretsbury (9)	123
64	Maldon Town (8)	2–3	King's Lynn (7)	278
65	Wootton Blue Cross (9)	1–2	Stotfold (9)	81
66	Hemel Hempstead Town (7)	5–1	North Greenford United (9)	214
67	Marlow (8)	1–2	Long Melford (10)	70
68	Hertford Town (9)	0–0	Bury Town (9)	216
replay	Bury Town (9)	1–1 (3–4 p)	Hertford Town (9)	215
69	Cornard United (10)	0–6	Aylesbury United (7)	89
70	Chelmsford City (7)	0–1	Yeading (7)	331
71	Beaconsfield SYCOB (8)	5–3	Hitchin Town (7)	112
72	Enfield (9)	1–4	Arlesey Town (8)	161
73	Leyton (7)	1–0	Tilbury (8)	83
74	Waltham Forest (8)	2–1	Cogenhoe United (9)	56
75	Ruislip Manor (9)	1–1	Harwich & Parkeston (9)	85
replay	Harwich & Parkeston (9)	2–0	Ruislip Manor (9)	162
76	Harlow Town (8)	0–1	Enfield Town (9)	223
77	Braintree Town (7)	2–0	Soham Town Rangers (9)	181
78	Aveley (8)	2–1	Berkhamsted Town (8)	89
79	Chesham United (7)	1–1	Bedford Town (7)	336
replay	Bedford Town (7)	4–1	Chesham United (7)	372
80	Brackley Town (8)	2–2	Flackwell Heath (9)	157
replay	Flackwell Heath (9)	2–0	Brackley Town (8)	111
81	Edgware Town (9)	4–1	Barkingside (9)	120
82	Gosport Borough (9)	1–2	Eastleigh (7)	441
83	Didcot Town (9)	2–2	Tooting & Mitcham United (8)	239
replay	Tooting & Mitcham United (8)	2–0	Didcot Town (9)	185
84	Whitstable Town (9)	4–0	Hailsham Town (9)	236
85	Leatherhead (8)	1–0	Cray Wanderers (8)	121
86	East Preston (9)	1–0	Merstham (9)	152
87	Ash United (9)	2–2	Maidstone United (9)	186
replay	Maidstone United (9)	2–0	Ash United (9)	226
88	Dartford (8)	0–1	Dorking (8)	292
89	Banstead Athletic (8)	2–3	Oxford City (8)	83
90	VCD Athletic (9)	0–0	Brockenhurst (9)	44
replay	Brockenhurst (9)	1–0	VCD Athletic (9)	101
91	Chatham Town (8)	1–1	Windsor & Eton (7)	177
replay	Windsor & Eton (7)	3–0	Chatham Town (8)	109
92	Thamesmead Town (9)	2–1	Worthing (7)	71
93	Ringmer (9)	1–1	Erith Town (9)	77
replay	Erith Town (9)	3–0	Ringmer (9)	64
94	Tonbridge Angels (7)	2–1	Winchester City (9)	439
95	Bracknell Town (8)	0–2	Sandhurst Town (9)	158
96	AFC Newbury (9)	4–0	BAT Sports (9)	89
97	Croydon Athletic (8)	0–1	Slough Town (7)	161
98	Metropolitan Police (8)	3–4	Dulwich Hamlet (8)	145
99	AFC Totton (9)	2–1	Tunbridge Wells (9)	123
100	Ashford Town (Middx) (8)	3–1	Bashley (8)	107
101	Horsham (8)	4–3	Abingdon United (9)	264
102	Fisher Athletic (8)	2–2	Bromley (8)	214
replay	Bromley (8)	1–0	Fisher Athletic (8)	334
103	Dover Athletic (7)	0–1	AFC Wimbledon (8)	2,103
104	Raynes Park Vale (9)	0–6	Folkestone Invicta (7)	98
105	Kingstonian (7)	0–2	Ramsgate (9)	268
106	Carterton Town (9)	1–1	Erith & Belvedere (8)	50
replay	Erith & Belvedere (8)	4–3	Carterton Town (9)	75
107	Molesey (8)	0–2	Lymington & New Milton (9)	115
108	Hastings United (8)	2–0	Mile Oak (10)	332
109	North Leigh (9)	1–0	Walton Casuals (9)	77
110	Chippenham Town (7)	4–0	Bitton (9)	517
111	Hallen (9)	2–0	Bemerton Heath Harlequins (9)	61
112	Bridport (9)	1–4	Bath City (7)	289
113	Fairford Town (9)	0–0	Bideford (9)	125
replay	Bideford (9)	2–0	Fairford Town (9)	253
114	Highworth Town (9)	3–5	Bishop's Cleeve (9)	145
115	Street (10)	3–2	Gloucester City (7)	234
116	Clevedon Town (8)	1–2	Merthyr Tydfil (7)	235
117	St Blazey (11)	1–3	Evesham United (8)	204
118	Swindon Supermarine (8)	0–1	Corsham Town (9)	110
119	Exmouth Town (9)	1–2	Salisbury City (7)	233
120	Bodmin Town (11)	0–3	Cirencester Town (7)	130
121	Frome Town (9)	2–2	Backwell United (9)	191
replay	Backwell United (9)	1–3	Frome Town (9)	90
122	Tiverton Town (7)	3–2	Mangotsfield United (8)	566
123	Barnstaple Town (9)	3–1	Bournemouth (9)	111
124	Yate Town (8)	0–1	Team Bath (7)	209

== Second qualifying round ==
Matches played on weekend of Saturday 2 October 2004. A total of 168 clubs took part in this stage of the competition, including the 124 winners from the first qualifying round and 44 Level 6 clubs, from Conference North and Conference South, entering at this stage. The round featured six clubs from Level 10 still in the competition, being the lowest ranked clubs in this round.

Tie	Home team (tier)	Score	Away team (tier)	Att.
1	Holker Old Boys (10)	0–3	Harrogate Town (6)	287
2	Horden Colliery Welfare (9)	3–0	Frickley Athletic (7)	132
3	Bradford Park Avenue (6)	2–1	Squires Gate (9)	229
4	Maltby Main (9)	1–3	Ashton United (6)	119
5	Whitby Town (7)	0–2	Mossley (8)	374
6	Glasshoughton Welfare (9)	2–1	Clitheroe (8)	123
7	Barrow (6)	3–3	Stalybridge Celtic (6)	746
replay	Stalybridge Celtic (6)	3–2	Barrow (6)	362
8	Gateshead (7)	4–1	Chorley (8)	158
9	Brigg Town (8)	1–0	Colne (9)	309
10	Lancaster City (6)	3–2	Esh Winning (9)	281
11	Altrincham (6)	4–1	Farsley Celtic (7)	557
12	Ramsbottom United (9)	0–2	Southport (6)	612
13	Fleetwood Town (9)	1–1	Runcorn FC Halton (6)	276
replay	Runcorn FC Halton (6)	2–1	Fleetwood Town (9)	199
14	Atherton Laburnum Rovers (9)	2–3	Hyde United (7)	200
15	Dunston Federation Brewery (9)	2–2	Cammell Laird (10)	200
replay	Cammell Laird (10)	2–0	Dunston Federation Brewery (9)	215
16	Billingham Town (9)	1–3	Vauxhall Motors (6)	140
17	Liversedge (9)	3–0	Prescot Cables (7)	153
18	Skelmersdale United (9)	2–3	Burscough (7)	1,002
19	Bamber Bridge (7)	1–5	Workington (7)	230
20	Ashington (9)	1–3	Droylsden (6)	326
21	Radcliffe Borough (7)	3–3	Shildon (9)	257
replay	Shildon (9)	0–2	Radcliffe Borough (7)	343
22	Willenhall Town (8)	0–0	Shepshed Dynamo (8)	190
replay	Shepshed Dynamo (8)	3–3 (3–4 p)	Willenhall Town (8)	202
23	Matlock Town (7)	0–5	Alfreton Town (6)	834
24	Spalding United (8)	5–4	Belper Town (8)	270
25	Gainsborough Trinity (6)	2–3	Halesowen Town (7)	419
26	Redditch United (6)	2–3	Histon (7)	388
27	King's Lynn (7)	1–0	Ludlow Town (9)	732
28	Leek Town (7)	1–1	Nuneaton Borough (6)	580
replay	Nuneaton Borough (6)	1–2	Leek Town (7)	717
29	Worcester City (6)	1–3	Cambridge City (6)	753
30	Coalville Town (9)	2–1	Rushall Olympic (9)	105
31	Gresley Rovers (8)	2–2	Hucknall Town (6)	385
replay	Hucknall Town (6)	3–1	Gresley Rovers (8)	438
32	Hinckley United (6)	3–1	Stamford (7)	363
33	Moor Green (6)	5–0	Carlton Town (10)	256
34	Stafford Rangers (6)	2–2	Kettering Town (6)	788
replay	Kettering Town (6)	0–1	Stafford Rangers (6)	904
35	Worksop Town (6)	3–0	Stone Dominoes (9)	338
36	Stratford Town (9)	1–0	Hednesford Town (7)	188
37	Lincoln United (7)	5–0	Winsford United (10)	119
38	Bishop's Stortford (6)	3–4	Hayes (6)	349
39	Lewes (6)	1–2	Brockenhurst (9)	413
40	Slough Town (7)	4–1	Welling United (6)	382
41	Bromley (8)	3–0	Thamesmead Town (9)	397
42	Oxford City (8)	0–1	Leyton (7)	144
43	Dorking (8)	0–1	Billericay Town (7)	302

Tie	Home team (tier)	Score	Away team (tier)	Att.
44	Whitstable Town (9)	0–0	Maidenhead United (6)	532
replay	Maidenhead United (6)	1–1 (3–2 p)	Whitstable Town (9)	210
45	Dunstable Town (7)	0–3	AFC Wimbledon (8)	1,972
46	Ramsgate (9)	3–6	Dulwich Hamlet (8)	276
47	Halstead Town (9)	0–3	Thurrock (6)	258
48	Cheshunt (7)	3–0	Northwood (7)	182
49	Edgware Town (9)	0–1	North Leigh (9)	115
50	Wealdstone (7)	3–1	Grays Athletic (6)	282
51	Eastbourne Borough (6)	3–4	Sutton United (6)	611
52	Tooting & Mitcham United (8)	2–2	Hemel Hempstead Town (7)	311
replay	Hemel Hempstead Town (7)	0–3	Tooting & Mitcham United (8)	207
53	Harwich & Parkeston (9)	0–3	Hornchurch (6)	410
54	Margate (6)	2–1	Waltham Forest (8)	201
55	Carshalton Athletic (6)	1–3	Hastings United (8)	337
56	Erith & Belvedere (8)	0–1	Flackwell Heath (9)	141
57	Harrow Borough (7)	2–2	Folkestone Invicta (7)	204
replay	Folkestone Invicta (7)	1–1 (4–5 p)	Harrow Borough (7)	315
58	Yeading (7)	2–0	Long Melford (10)	99
59	Tonbridge Angels (7)	1–1	Braintree Town (7)	600
replay	Braintree Town (7)	2–0	Tonbridge Angels (7)	251
60	Sandhurst Town (9)	0–2	Leatherhead (8)	210
61	Erith Town (9)	2–3	Horsham (8)	182
62	Heybridge Swifts (7)	0–2	St Albans City (6)	279
St Albans City played ineligible player, therefore the winners of the match were Heybridge Swifts
63	Maidstone United (9)	2–1	Redbridge (6)	322
64	Boreham Wood (8)	2–1	Aveley (8)	123
65	Beaconsfield SYCOB (8)	1–2	Windsor & Eton (7)	205
66	Arlesey Town (8)	2–3	Wivenhoe Town (8)	177
67	Ashford Town (Middx) (8)	3–1	Hertford Town (9)	140
68	Enfield Town (9)	0–1	Thame United (8)	317
69	East Preston (9)	1–0	Uxbridge (8)	199
70	Bedford Town (7)	1–3	Hendon (7)	462
71	Stotfold (9)	1–1	Aylesbury United (7)	238
replay	Aylesbury United (7)	4–2	Stotfold (9)	257
72	Dorchester Town (6)	0–1	Weymouth (6)	2,305
73	Corsham Town (9)	0–2	Newport County (6)	550
74	Basingstoke Town (6)	2–4	AFC Newbury (9)	461
75	Eastleigh (7)	5–0	Barnstaple Town (9)	240
76	Street (10)	1–2	Merthyr Tydfil (7)	315
77	Bishop's Cleeve (9)	4–1	AFC Totton (9)	400
78	Salisbury City (7)	1–1	Frome Town (9)	636
replay	Frome Town (9)	0–3	Salisbury City (7)	665
79	Havant & Waterlooville (6)	0–2	Bath City (7)	312
80	Team Bath (7)	0–0	Hallen (9)	110
replay	Hallen (9)	0–0 (5–4 p)	Team Bath (7)	231
81	Tiverton Town (7)	0–0	Bideford (9)	863
replay	Bideford (9)	1–3	Tiverton Town (7)	732
82	Bognor Regis Town (6)	4–3	Cirencester Town (7)	429
83	Evesham United (8)	1–3	Weston-super-Mare (6)	212
84	Lymington & New Milton (9)	3–2	Chippenham Town (7)	267

== Third qualifying round ==
Matches played on weekend of Saturday 16 October 2004. A total of 84 clubs took part, all having progressed from the second qualifying round. Cammell Laird from Level 10 of English football were the lowest-ranked club to qualify for this round of the competition.

Tie	Home team (tier)	Score	Away team (tier)	Att.
1	Hinckley United (6)	6–1	Mossley (8)	507
2	Ashton United (6)	0–3	Burscough (7)	246
3	Halesowen Town (7)	4–1	Glasshoughton Welfare (9)	512
4	Leek Town (7)	2–1	Stalybridge Celtic (6)	561
5	Altrincham (6)	3–3	Hucknall Town (6)	615
replay	Hucknall Town (6)	1–0	Altrincham (6)	525
6	Stratford Town (9)	0–3	Southport (6)	396
7	Liversedge (9)	3–2	Harrogate Town (6)	386
8	Horden Colliery Welfare (9)	2–3	Gateshead (7)	278
9	Vauxhall Motors (6)	1–0	Workington (7)	242
10	Runcorn FC Halton (6)	0–1	Stafford Rangers (6)	376
11	Cammell Laird (10)	2–3	Alfreton Town (6)	270
12	Worksop Town (6)	3–2	Droylsden (6)	485
13	Lancaster City (6)	1–0	King's Lynn (7)	318
14	Lincoln United (7)	1–2	Hyde United (7)	190
15	Radcliffe Borough (7)	1–0	Moor Green (6)	244
16	Willenhall Town (8)	1–2	Coalville Town (9)	285
17	Bradford Park Avenue (6)	1–2	Brigg Town (8)	290
18	Leyton (7)	1–1	Hendon (7)	176
replay	Hendon (7)	3–1	Leyton (7)	191
19	Hayes (6)	2–0	Wivenhoe Town (8)	248
20	Heybridge Swifts (7)	2–3	Yeading (7)	239
21	Wealdstone (7)	5–1	Boreham Wood (8)	372
22	Sutton United (6)	2–2	Bromley (8)	495
replay	Bromley (8)	2–1	Sutton United (6)	487

Tie	Home team (tier)	Score	Away team (tier)	Att.
23	Maidenhead United (6)	2–1	Windsor & Eton (7)	413
24	Hornchurch (6)	9–0	Dulwich Hamlet (8)	815
25	Tooting & Mitcham United (8)	2–4	Cambridge City (6)	401
26	Slough Town (7)	4–0	Cheshunt (7)	384
27	Histon (7)	5–0	Horsham (8)	432
28	Harrow Borough (7)	0–1	Flackwell Heath (9)	157
29	AFC Wimbledon (8)	0–2	Thurrock (6)	3,007
30	Leatherhead (8)	2–1	Maidstone United (9)	528
31	Braintree Town (7)	3–1	Margate (6)	357
32	Aylesbury United (7)	0–1	Ashford Town (Middx) (8)	324
33	East Preston (9)	0–2	Billericay Town (7)	488
34	Spalding United (8)	1–0	Hastings United (8)	359
35	Brockenhurst (9)	0–3	Bath City (7)	402
36	Tiverton Town (7)	3–3	Eastleigh (7)	673
replay	Eastleigh (7)	0–1	Tiverton Town (7)	485
37	Bognor Regis Town (6)	2–0	AFC Newbury (9)	595
38	Hallen (9)	3–2	Bishop's Cleeve (9)	247
39	Merthyr Tydfil (7)	0–1	Lymington & New Milton (9)	349
40	North Leigh (9)	0–0	Newport County (6)	426
replay	Newport County (6)	6–2	North Leigh (9)	634
41	Weston-super-Mare (6)	1–3	Salisbury City (7)	543
42	Weymouth (6)	1–1	Thame United (8)	1,149
replay	Thame United (8)	2–1	Weymouth (6)	411

== Fourth qualifying round ==
Matches played on weekend of Saturday 30 October 2004. A total of 64 clubs took part, 42 having progressed from the third qualifying round and 22 clubs from Conference Premier, forming Level 5 of English football, entering at this stage. The round featured five clubs from Level 9 still in the competition, being the lowest ranked clubs in this round.

Tie	Home team (tier)	Score	Away team (tier)	Att.
1	Southport (6)	3–1	Hyde United (7)	1,179
2	Northwich Victoria (5)	1–2	Vauxhall Motors (6)	738
3	Hinckley United (6)	0–0	Burton Albion (5)	1,355
replay	Burton Albion (5)	1–1 (1–4 p)	Hinckley United (6)	1,218
4	Hereford United (5)	2–1	Radcliffe Borough (7)	1,788
5	Brigg Town (8)	1–4	Halesowen Town (7)	588
6	Carlisle United (5)	3–1	York City (5)	5,073
7	Halifax Town (5)	2–2	Leek Town (7)	1,544
replay	Leek Town (7)	0–1	Halifax Town (5)	1,244
8	Tamworth (5)	2–1	Burscough (7)	1,006
9	Stafford Rangers (6)	2–1	Gateshead (7)	1,014
10	Morecambe (5)	5–1	Hucknall Town (6)	1,183
11	Worksop Town (6)	1–1	Alfreton Town (6)	1,263
replay	Alfreton Town (6)	2–1	Worksop Town (6)	1,238
12	Accrington Stanley (5)	0–2	Leigh RMI (5)	1,121
13	Lancaster City (6)	1–1	Scarborough (5)	600
replay	Scarborough (5)	0–1	Lancaster City (6)	1,073
14	Liversedge (9)	0–0	Coalville Town (9)	820
replay	Coalville Town (9)	2–0	Liversedge (9)	1,378

Tie	Home team (tier)	Score	Away team (tier)	Att.
15	Billericay Town (7)	3–0	Flackwell Heath (9)	608
16	Barnet (5)	2–1	Farnborough Town (5)	1,822
17	Thame United (8)	0–5	Forest Green Rovers (5)	778
18	Canvey Island (5)	4–1	Hallen (9)	511
19	Lymington & New Milton (9)	1–1	Woking (5)	879
replay	Woking (5)	4–2	Lymington & New Milton (9)	1,209
20	Dagenham & Redbridge (5)	2–1	Crawley Town (5)	1,104
21	Hornchurch (6)	3–2	Gravesend & Northfleet (5)	1,644
22	Exeter City (5)	2–0	Braintree Town (7)	2,308
23	Slough Town (7)	3–2	Salisbury City (7)	1,195
24	Bath City (7)	1–0	Leatherhead (8)	938
25	Aldershot Town (5)	2–1	Maidenhead United (6)	2,100
26	Hayes (6)	4–0	Ashford Town (Middx) (8)	649
27	Thurrock (6)	6–0	Spalding United (8)	325
28	Stevenage Borough (5)	5–0	Hendon (7)	1,328
29	Tiverton Town (7)	4–1	Newport County (6)	1,007
30	Wealdstone (7)	0–2	Histon (7)	409
31	Bromley (8)	0–3	Cambridge City (6)	732
32	Bognor Regis Town (6)	0–2	Yeading (7)	786

== Competition proper ==
See 2004–05 FA Cup for details of the rounds from the first round proper onwards.
