= 2005–06 Northern Premier League =

The 2005–06 Northern Premier League season was the 38th in the history of the Northern Premier League, a football competition in England. Teams were divided into two divisions; the Premier and the First.

== Premier Division ==
Northern Premier League Premier Division
- Season: 2005–06
- Champions: Blyth Spartans
- Promoted: Blyth Spartans; Farsley Celtic
- Relegated: Bradford Park Avenue; Wakefield
- Matches: 465
- Goals: 1,282 (2.76 per match)

The Premier Division featured six new clubs:

- Ashton United relegated from Conference North
- Bradford Park Avenue relegated from Conference North
- Runcorn F.C. Halton relegated from Conference North
- North Ferriby United as champions from Division One.
- Ilkeston Town as runners-up from Division One.
- A.F.C. Telford United via play-offs from Division One.

=== League table ===
Pos	Team	Pld	W	D	L	GF	GA	GD	Pts	Promotion or relegation
1	Blyth Spartans (C, P)	42	26	11	5	79	32	+47	89	Promotion to Conference North
2	Frickley Athletic	42	26	8	8	72	36	+36	86	Qualification for Playoffs
3	Marine	42	23	12	7	61	25	+36	81	Qualification for Playoffs
4	Farsley Celtic (P)	42	23	10	9	84	34	+50	79	Qualification for Playoffs
5	North Ferriby United	42	21	10	11	77	54	+23	73	Qualification for Playoffs
6	Whitby Town	42	18	10	14	60	59	+1	64	
7	Burscough	42	19	6	17	64	64	0	63	
8	Witton Albion	42	17	9	16	68	55	+13	60	
9	Matlock Town	42	16	11	15	60	55	+5	59	
10	A.F.C. Telford United	42	14	17	11	54	52	+2	59	
11	Ossett Town	42	17	7	18	57	61	−4	58	
12	Leek Town	42	14	14	14	50	53	−3	56	
13	Prescot Cables	42	15	8	19	49	60	−11	53	
14	Guiseley	42	14	9	19	45	58	−13	51	
15	Ashton United	42	13	10	19	62	63	−1	49	
16	Ilkeston Town	42	12	13	17	48	51	−3	49	
17	Gateshead	42	12	10	20	52	77	−25	46	
18	Radcliffe Borough	42	12	8	22	54	62	−8	44	
19	Lincoln United	42	10	14	18	44	64	−20	44 (Note: Lincoln United had superior record to same placed Isthmian League team, and consequently kept place in the division.)	
20	Wakefield-Emley (R)	42	11	9	22	38	69	−31	42 (Note: Previously called Wakefield-Emley to Wakefield during the Season.)	Relegation to NPL Division One
21	Bradford Park Avenue (R)	42	10	9	23	64	86	−22	39	Relegation to NPL Division One
22	Runcorn F.C. Halton	42	6	11	25	36	108	−72	29	Resigned, club folded at end of season. The Runcorn Linnets Replaced in NWCFL Division Two.

Updated to match(es) played on 8 February 2011. Source:
Rules for classification: 1) points; 2) goal difference; 3) number of goals scored.
(C) Champions; (P) Promoted; (R) Relegated

=== Results ===
Home \ Away	TEL	ASH	BLY	BPA	BUR	FAR	FRK	GAT	GUI	ILK	LEE	LIN	MAR	MAT	NFU	OST	PRC	RAD	RUN	WAK	WTB	WTN
A.F.C. Telford United		2–1	1–1	3–6	0–1	1–0	1–3	1–1	0–0	0–0	1–0	2–0	1–1	2–1	2–1	1–1	3–2	2–1	3–1	2–3	3–1	2–2
Ashton United	0–0		2–3	3–0	1–3	1–1	0–1	3–1	2–2	2–2	3–1	3–0	1–2	1–1	2–4	0–3	1–3	3–0	6–0	4–0	4–2	0–2
Blyth Spartans	1–1	2–0		2–0	1–0	0–1	1–0	1–1	3–1	1–1	2–1	0–1	1–0	2–2	4–2	4–4	2–0	1–0	0–0	3–0	1–0	5–1
Bradford Park Avenue	0–1	1–1	2–1		3–4	4–3	1–4	0–1	1–3	2–2	0–0	1–1	1–3	1–2	0–4	2–0	1–0	1–2	8–0	2–1	0–0	2–3
Burscough	0–1	3–0	0–0	0–1		0–3	0–1	2–3	3–2	2–1	1–2	1–1	0–3	1–1	3–2	4–1	2–3	3–0	2–2	3–2	2–1	1–1
Farsley Celtic	2–0	3–0	1–1	3–0	2–4		0–1	4–2	1–1	1–1	3–2	3–0	0–1	3–1	1–1	3–0	2–0	3–0	5–0	6–1	1–3	0–3
Frickley Athletic	1–0	2–2	3–2	6–2	4–1	1–0		1–2	2–1	2–0	2–1	2–2	0–0	1–0	1–1	1–0	0–1	0–2	1–0	0–0	3–0	2–0
Gateshead	1–1	3–2	1–2	2–1	2–0	0–5	2–2		0–2	1–2	2–0	1–1	0–1	1–5	2–3	2–1	0–3	0–0	2–4	3–2	3–2	3–2
Guiseley	1–0	1–3	0–2	0–3	3–1	0–3	2–0	1–0		2–2	1–1	1–2	1–0	1–0	0–2	0–2	2–5	3–2	1–1	0–1	0–2	3–1
Ilkeston Town	2–0	2–0	0–0	2–0	1–2	1–1	0–2	3–1	0–1		2–2	1–2	1–0	0–1	1–1	0–1	0–2	3–1	2–0	2–0	0–0	2–0
Leek Town	1–1	1–0	0–3	3–0	3–0	1–1	0–2	0–0	0–2	0–3		1–0	1–1	1–1	0–0	1–1	1–1	0–3	2–2	0–0	3–0	2–2
Lincoln United	1–2	0–0	0–1	3–2	0–1	0–1	3–7	2–2	1–0	2–2	3–3		1–1	0–1	0–1	0–0	0–2	1–1	0–0	1–2	2–0	1–2
Marine	1–1	2–2	0–1	3–1	2–1	1–0	1–0	0–0	2–0	4–2	1–2	5–1		0–0	1–0	4–0	1–0	3–0	2–0	0–0	0–0	0–1
Matlock Town	1–1	0–0	0–1	1–0	3–0	0–0	1–2	1–2	1–0	2–0	0–2	0–3	2–5		1–1	1–0	3–1	1–1	2–1	0–1	4–1	0–4
North Ferriby United	1–0	1–0	1–4	5–2	0–1	0–1	1–2	1–0	2–2	2–1	4–0	0–0	0–2	3–2		2–1	3–0	2–1	3–1	3–3	0–0	5–1
Ossett Town	1–1	3–2	3–1	3–2	0–0	0–1	2–4	3–1	1–0	1–0	0–1	1–3	0–2	4–4	2–3		3–1	2–0	2–1	2–0	2–3	1–0
Prescot Cables	0–0	2–1	1–3	2–2	1–2	1–1	0–2	2–1	0–2	0–0	0–2	1–3	0–1	2–1	0–2	2–1		1–0	0–0	2–0	5–1	1–1
Radcliffe Borough	2–2	1–2	0–3	1–0	0–2	0–5	0–3	4–0	0–0	3–1	2–3	4–0	2–0	0–1	1–2	0–1	4–0		8–1	3–0	0–1	1–3
Runcorn	0–7	1–2	0–5	2–2	1–3	0–7	1–1	2–1	0–0	2–1	0–1	0–1	0–0	0–4	2–4	0–2	5–1	2–2		2–1	1–1	0–4
Wakefield	1–1	0–1	0–3	1–1	2–1	0–1	0–0	1–0	1–3	1–0	1–3	1–1	0–2	2–3	1–0	0–1	1–0	0–0	2–0		2–3	0–2
Whitby Town	4–1	2–2	0–4	3–3	1–2	1–1	2–0	2–0	1–0	2–0	1–0	2–1	1–1	2–1	4–2	2–1	0–1	1–1	4–0	4–2		0–2
Witton Albion	4–0	0–1	1–1	2–3	2–3	0–1	1–0	2–2	4–0	3–1	0–1	3–0	0–2	2–4	2–2	2–0	0–0	0–1	2–0	1–2	0–0	

Updated to match(es) played on 29 April 2006. Source: Northern Premier Division results grid
Legend: Blue = home team win; Yellow = draw; Red = away team win.

=== Play-offs ===
The Premier Division playoffs saw the second to fifth placed sides in the Division compete for one place in the Conference North.

Semi-finals; 1 May 2006
3	Marine	0
4	Farsley Celtic	1
2	Frickley Athletic	0(2)
5	North Ferriby United	0(4)

Final; 6 May 2006
4	Farsley Celtic	2*
5	North Ferriby United	1

* After extra time

== Division One ==
Northern Premier League Division One
- Season: 2005–06
- Champions: Mossley
- Promoted: Fleetwood Town; Kendal Town; Mossley
- Relegated: Bishop Auckland
- Matches: 465
- Goals: 1,398 (3.01 per match)

Division One featured four new clubs:

- Bamber Bridge, relegated from the NPL Premier Division
- Bishop Auckland, relegated from the NPL Premier Division
- Bridlington Town, relegated from the NPL Premier Division
- Fleetwood Town, promoted from the North West Counties League Division One
- Goole, promoted from the Northern Counties East League Premier Division

=== League table ===
Pos	Team	Pld	W	D	L	GF	GA	GD	Pts	Promotion or relegation
1	Mossley (C, P)	42	23	9	10	83	55	+28	78	Promotion to NPL Premier Division
2	Fleetwood Town (P)	42	22	10	10	72	48	+24	76	Promotion to NPL Premier Division
3	Kendal Town (P)	42	22	10	10	81	58	+23	76	Qualification for Playoffs
4	Woodley Sports	42	22	8	12	85	53	+32	74	Qualification for Playoffs
5	Gresley Rovers	42	20	10	12	79	64	+15	70	Qualification for Playoffs
6	Stocksbridge Park Steels	42	17	16	9	66	43	+23	67	Qualification for Playoffs
7	Eastwood Town	42	16	14	12	66	58	+8	62	
8	Brigg Town	42	16	14	12	70	64	+6	62	
9	Belper Town	42	17	8	17	53	56	−3	59	
10	Shepshed Dynamo	42	15	13	14	57	56	+1	58	
11	Bridlington Town	42	16	10	16	61	68	−7	58	
12	Colwyn Bay	42	15	11	16	56	53	+3	56	
13	Bamber Bridge	42	13	15	14	65	59	+6	54	
14	Ossett Albion	42	15	9	18	54	64	−10	54	
15	Rossendale United	42	12	17	13	58	61	−3	53	
16	Clitheroe	42	15	8	19	54	73	−19	53	
17	Kidsgrove Athletic	42	14	9	19	66	69	−3	51	
18	Chorley	42	14	8	20	58	59	−1	50	
19	Warrington Town	42	11	15	16	62	74	−12	48	
20	Spalding United	42	10	15	17	49	70	−21	45	Transferred to Southern League Division One Midlands
21	Goole	42	11	11	20	55	85	−30	43 (Note: Goole were docked 1 point during the campaign and their record had to be compared with the same placed side in the Isthmian League to determine which team would be relegated. As Goole's record was superior, they stayed up.)	
22	Bishop Auckland (R)	42	3	6	33	39	99	−60	15	Relegation to Northern League Division One

Rules for classification: 1) points; 2) goal difference; 3) number of goals scored.
(C) Champions; (P) Promoted; (R) Relegated

=== Results ===
Home \ Away	BAM	BLP	BIS	BRI	BRG	CHO	CLT	COL	EAS	FLE	GOO	GRE	KEN	KID	MOS	OSA	ROS	SPD	SPA	STO	WAR	WDL
Bamber Bridge		0–1	7–2	1–1	3–4	3–1	2–2	2–1	3–1	2–1	1–0	1–1	0–5	2–4	1–2	0–0	0–1	2–1	4–0	1–1	2–1	1–1
Belper Town	1–0		2–1	2–3	1–1	3–1	2–0	2–1	2–1	1–4	2–0	2–1	3–4	0–0	4–0	1–4	0–1	0–1	2–2	0–1	1–1	1–0
Bishop Auckland	1–1	1–3		2–1	0–3	1–4	1–2	0–1	0–1	1–3	0–2	1–2	2–2	2–1	1–2	1–2	1–1	0–4	0–2	1–4	2–3	0–3
Bridlington Town	2–0	2–1	1–0		3–1	4–1	1–0	0–0	2–3	1–1	3–1	2–2	1–2	1–1	2–1	2–1	1–2	1–0	1–0	1–1	1–1	0–2
Brigg Town	3–2	1–2	2–0	3–2		1–0	2–2	1–1	2–2	3–1	1–0	2–1	2–1	2–3	0–1	2–3	2–2	0–1	3–1	0–0	3–2	1–2
Chorley	0–1	1–0	2–2	2–2	1–2		1–2	1–1	0–1	1–1	0–1	2–2	1–1	1–2	1–2	3–0	2–3	1–2	1–1	1–1	3–0	1–4
Clitheroe	1–0	0–2	4–1	2–0	2–2	0–1		1–0	0–3	1–0	1–0	3–3	0–3	2–2	3–2	4–2	2–0	1–1	2–1	0–1	2–3	3–2
Colwyn Bay	1–1	0–1	2–0	1–3	0–0	1–2	0–0		0–0	2–0	4–1	6–0	0–1	4–3	3–0	2–0	0–4	2–0	3–0	1–1	3–0	2–1
Eastwood Town	1–1	2–0	2–0	0–3	2–0	0–4	3–1	4–1		0–1	3–3	2–3	3–3	2–1	2–2	3–2	4–0	1–1	0–0	1–1	3–3	4–0
Fleetwood Town	0–0	2–0	3–2	2–3	5–1	2–1	4–0	2–1	3–2		0–1	1–1	1–2	0–2	1–1	2–2	2–2	1–0	2–1	1–1	1–0	2–0
Goole	3–3	1–0	1–0	2–2	2–2	2–2	1–0	3–0	0–3	3–3		2–3	2–4	1–1	0–0	1–4	1–1	0–5	1–6	0–4	2–3	1–4
Gresley	3–1	3–1	3–1	2–1	3–2	2–1	3–1	3–2	2–0	0–2	4–0		0–1	0–0	3–1	3–1	1–1	0–0	3–0	1–1	2–3	2–5
Kendal Town	2–0	2–2	3–3	2–1	1–4	1–2	1–4	0–0	1–1	2–1	3–1	0–3		4–0	1–1	0–1	4–0	1–2	3–0	1–1	3–1	2–1
Kidsgrove Athletic	0–2	1–0	3–0	3–2	1–4	1–0	5–0	6–0	0–0	0–3	3–3	0–1	0–2		2–3	1–3	2–1	2–3	3–0	0–3	3–3	2–1
Mossley	1–1	4–2	2–1	6–1	1–0	2–1	1–0	1–2	4–0	0–1	3–0	3–1	5–2	2–1		7–0	2–1	2–3	3–1	2–0	1–1	2–2
Ossett Albion	3–2	0–2	2–2	5–2	1–2	1–2	2–1	1–0	0–0	1–2	0–1	2–1	1–2	0–1	0–2		1–0	1–1	1–2	1–0	1–1	2–1
Rossendale United	1–1	2–2	3–0	5–0	1–1	0–1	2–1	2–1	1–0	0–1	2–2	1–4	3–2	1–1	0–0	0–1		2–4	3–3	0–0	2–2	2–3
Shepshed Dynamo	0–5	0–1	0–0	0–0	1–1	1–0	5–0	0–0	0–2	4–0	0–4	1–2	0–3	2–1	2–1	1–1	2–2		0–0	0–1	2–1	1–2
Spalding United	1–1	0–0	2–1	2–0	1–1	1–2	1–2	2–3	0–0	0–4	0–2	4–3	3–0	2–1	0–4	1–1	0–0	2–2		2–2	2–2	1–0
Stocksbridge Park Steels	1–1	4–1	4–2	1–0	3–0	1–3	4–0	1–1	3–1	1–2	1–2	2–1	0–1	2–0	2–3	1–0	2–3	3–1	0–0		2–1	0–0
Warrington Town	0–3	0–0	4–2	3–0	1–1	2–1	1–0	1–2	1–2	2–4	2–1	0–0	0–1	3–2	1–1	2–0	0–0	2–2	1–2	2–2		1–3
Woodley Sports	3–1	3–0	0–2	1–2	2–2	0–2	2–2	2–1	4–1	0–0	2–1	2–1	2–2	2–1	5–0	0–0	2–0	5–1	3–0	4–2	4–1	

Updated to match(es) played on 29 April 2006. Source: Northern Premier League First Division results grid
Legend: Blue = home team win; Yellow = draw; Red = away team win.

=== Play-offs ===
The First Division playoffs saw the third to sixth placed sides in the First Division compete for a place in the Premier Division.

Semi-finals; 1 May 2006
4	Woodley Sports	0
5	Gresley Rovers	4
3	Kendal Town	1(4)
6	Stocksbridge Park Steels	1(2)

Final; 6 May 2006
5	Gresley Rovers	1
3	Kendal Town	2

== Promotion and relegation ==
In the thirty-eighth season of the Northern Premier League Blyth Spartans (as champions) and Farsley Celtic (as play-off winners) were promoted to the Conference North. Wakefield, Bradford Park Avenue and Runcorn Halton were relegated to the First Division; these three clubs were replaced by relegated Conference North side Hednesford Town, First Division winners Mossley, second placed Fleetwood Town and play-off winners Kendal Town. In the First Division Bishop Auckland were relegated and were replaced by Buxton, Cammell Laird, Harrogate Railway Athletic, Alsager Town and Skelmersdale United.

== Cup Results ==
Challenge Cup: Teams from both leagues.

- Farsley Celtic 1–0 Stocksbridge Park Steels

President's Cup: 'Plate' competition for losing teams in the NPL Cup.

- Bradford Park Avenue 1–0 Ilkeston Town

Chairman's Cup: 'Plate' competition for losing teams in the NPL Cup.

- Blyth Spartans bt. Ossett Town

Peter Swales Shield: Between Champions of NPL Premier Division and Winners of the NPL Cup.

- Blyth Spartans bt. Farsley Celtic

== See also ==
- Northern Premier League
- 2005–06 Isthmian League
- 2005–06 Southern Football League
