= 2005–06 North West Counties Football League =

The 2005–06 North West Counties Football League season (known as the Moore & Co Solicitors North West Counties Football League for sponsorship reasons) was the 24th in the history of the North West Counties Football League, a football competition in England.`

The league comprised two divisions, Division One and Division Two (at levels 9 and 10 of the English football league system, Steps 5 and 6 of the National League System respectively). Additionally there were two cup competitions: the League Challenge Cup knockout competition open to all the league's clubs and the Second Division Trophy, a knockout trophy competition for Division Two clubs only. The league also had a reserves team section.

== Division One ==
North West Counties Football League Division One
- Season: 2005–06
- Teams: 22
- Champions: Cammell Laird
- Promoted: Cammell Laird; Skelmersdale United; Alsager Town
- Relegated: None
- Matches: 462
- Goals: 1,507 (3.26 per match)
- Average attendance: 102

Division One featured 22 clubs, 20 remaining from the previous season plus 2 additions (both promoted from Division Two):

- Cammell Laird promoted as champions
- Silsden promoted as runners up

At the end of the season, owing to the forthcoming expansion of the Northern Premier League Division One, three clubs were promoted to it: champions Cammell Laird, runners-up Skelmersdale United and third-placed Alsager Town. Consequently no clubs were relegated from this divsison.

A league record to date for the highest number of victories was established by Cammell Laird with 35 from 42 matches played (the previous best was 33 by Atherton Laburnum Rovers in the 1992–93 season although owing to a six point deduction Cammell Laird did not better their points tally). Each of the bottom three placed clubs conceded in excess of 100 league goals over the season and of those Stone Dominoes created a Division One record for the highest number of goals conceded by a club over a season with 146 goals against over 42 matches played (exceeding the 137 conceded over 42 matches by Blackpool Mechanics in the 1992–93 season).

=== League table ===
Pos	Team	Pld	W	D	L	GF	GA	GD	Pts	Season End Notes
1	Cammell Laird (C, P)	42	35	3	4	126	36	+90	102 (Note: Cammell Laird, Colne and Silsden each had 6 points deducted)	Promoted to Northern Premier; League Division One
2	Skelmersdale United (P)	42	28	7	7	119	48	+71	91	Promoted to Northern Premier; League Division One
3	Alsager Town (P)	42	27	7	8	87	43	+44	88	Promoted to Northern Premier; League Division One
4	Nantwich Town	42	26	6	10	91	37	+54	84	
5	Salford City	42	23	10	9	79	46	+33	79	
6	Newcastle Town	42	21	9	12	97	52	+45	72	
7	Curzon Ashton	42	20	8	14	72	66	+6	68	
8	St Helens Town	42	20	7	15	70	68	+2	67	
9	Colne	42	22	3	17	84	70	+14	63	
10	Maine Road	42	17	10	15	65	56	+9	61	
11	Abbey Hey	42	14	12	16	61	70	−9	54	
12	Congleton Town	42	15	8	19	50	63	−13	53	
13	Squires Gate	42	12	15	15	43	62	−19	51	
14	Silsden	42	16	8	18	76	75	+1	50	
15	Trafford	42	13	13	16	71	56	+15	49 (Note: Trafford had 3 points deducted)	
16	Glossop North End	42	12	11	19	62	78	−16	47	
17	Bacup Borough	42	13	8	21	44	62	−18	47	
18	Ramsbottom United	42	9	18	15	45	60	−15	45	
19	Atherton Collieries	42	7	9	26	43	93	−50	30	
20	Atherton Laburnum Rovers	42	7	8	27	40	115	−75	29	
21	Stone Dominoes	42	5	5	32	39	146	−107	20	
22	Formby	42	4	7	31	43	105	−62	19	

Source: NWCFL: Final Tables, Season 2005/06
Rules for classification: 1) points; 2) goal difference; 3) number of goals scored.
(C) Champions; (P) Promoted

== Division Two ==
North West Counties Football League Division Two
- Season: 2005–06
- Teams: 19
- Champions: F.C. United of Manchester
- Promoted: F.C. United of Manchester; Flixton; Nelson
- Relegated: None
- Matches: 342
- Goals: 1,110 (3.25 per match)
- Average attendance: 333

Division Two featured 19 clubs, 17 remaining from the previous season plus 2 additions:

- F.C. United of Manchester a newly formed club
- Great Harwood Town relegated from Division One

The start-up club F.C. United of Manchester were responsible for the uplift in average match attendance to 333 from the previous season's 71; from the total league attendance of 113,822, their total home match figure (fixtures played at Bury F.C.) was 55,053 (3,059 per match) and 38,440 (2,136 per match) at away fixtures – representing 82% of the total league attendance. They established a league single match attendance record of 6,023 (on 22 April 2006 v. Great Harwood Town) eclipsing the previous record of 2,281 (from Workington versus Mossley in the 1998–99 season).

Bottom placed club Castleton Gabriels in losing 31 of their 36 matches created a division record for the highest proportion of matches lost in a season and, following an eight point deduction for league rule transgressions, with only one point to their name in the final table they recorded the least season end points for any club in the league (without the deduction their nine points earned would have been the third lowest behind Darwen (Division One, 1983–84) and Newton (Division Two, 1988–89) who after adjusting to a three points for a win basis would have recorded eight points each).

At the end of the season in order to maintain the number of clubs in Division One three clubs were promoted: champions in their first season in the league F.C. United of Manchester, runners-up Flixton and third-placed Nelson. The only club leaving the division were Great Harwood Town (who had been in Division One the previous season) who folded after the season ended.

=== League table ===
Pos	Team	Pld	W	D	L	GF	GA	GD	Pts	Season End Notes
1	F.C. United of Manchester (C, P)	36	27	6	3	111	35	+76	87	Promoted to Division One
2	Flixton (P)	36	24	7	5	93	37	+56	79	Promoted to Division One
3	Nelson (P)	36	23	5	8	82	53	+29	74	Promoted to Division One
4	Winsford United	36	19	8	9	65	41	+24	65	
5	Padiham	36	19	5	12	76	52	+24	62	
6	Great Harwood Town	36	18	8	10	51	33	+18	62	Resigned (folded after season)
7	Ashton Town	36	17	7	12	59	57	+2	58	
8	Norton United	36	13	12	11	45	47	−2	51	
9	Blackpool Mechanics	36	13	10	13	48	51	−3	49	
10	Oldham Town	36	14	6	16	46	49	−3	48	
11	Eccleshall	36	13	7	16	50	64	−14	46	
12	New Mills	36	13	7	16	46	62	−16	46	
13	Chadderton	36	13	8	15	51	62	−11	44 (Note: Chadderton had 3 points deducted)	
14	Cheadle Town	36	14	6	16	55	53	+2	42 (Note: Cheadle Town had 6 points deducted)	
15	Holker Old Boys	36	11	8	17	58	74	−16	41	
16	Darwen	36	11	2	23	47	61	−14	35	
17	Leek County School Old Boys	36	7	7	22	51	82	−31	28	
18	Daisy Hill	36	7	6	23	38	75	−37	27	
19	Castleton Gabriels	36	2	3	31	38	122	−84	1 (Note: Castleton Gabriels had 8 points deducted)	

Source: NWCFL: Final Tables, Season 2005/06
Rules for classification: 1) points; 2) goal difference; 3) number of goals scored.
(C) Champions; (P) Promoted

== League Challenge Cup ==
The 2005–06 League Challenge Cup was a knockout competition open to all the league's clubs. The all Division One club final, played at Skelmersdale United F.C., was won by Salford City who defeated the cup holders and this season's Division One champions Cammell Laird 3–2.

Semi-finals and Final

(The semi-finals were decided on aggregate score from two legs played)

Semi-finals
Cammell Laird (D1)	5	5	10
Flixton (D2)	0	1	1
Oldham Town (D2)	1	0	1
Salford City (D1)	0	2	2

Final (Note: Played at Skelmersdale United F.C.)
Cammell Laird (D1)	2
Salford City (D1)	3

Club's division appended to team name: (D1)=Division One; (D2)=Division Two
sources:

- Semi-finals: David Williams (28 March 2006). "Historic day as Lairds bid to reach FA Vase Final". Wirral Globe.; "Cup glory". Manchester Evening News. 30 March 2006.
- Final: "Lairds' double dream is over". Wirral Globe. 2 May 2006.

== Second Division Trophy ==
The 2005–06 Second Division Trophy was a knockout competition for Division Two clubs only. In the final, played at Trafford F.C., the previous season's losing finalist Flixton defeated Winsford United 2–1.

Semi-finals and Final

(The semi-finals were decided on aggregate score from two legs played)

Semi-finals
Flixton	2	0	2
Nelson	0	1	1
Cheadle Town	1	2	3
Winsford United	3	2	5

Final (Note: Played at Trafford F.C.)
Flixton	2
Winsford United	1

sources:

- Semi-finals: "Division Two Trophy". nwcfl.co.uk. April 2006. Archived from the original on 10 May 2006.
- Final: "Blues lose out in the cup". Warrington Guardian. 26 April 2006.

== Reserves Section ==
Main honours for the 2005–06 season:

- Reserves Division
  - Winners: Formby Reserves
  - Runners-up: Nantwich Town Reserves
- Reserves Division Cup
  - Winners: Nelson Reserves
  - Runners-up: Nantwich Town Reserves
