= 2003–04 North West Counties Football League =

The 2003–04 North West Counties Football League season was the 22nd in the history of the North West Counties Football League, a football competition in England.

The league comprised two divisions, Division One and Division Two (at levels 8 and 9 respectively of the English football league system). Additionally there were two cup competitions: the League Challenge Cup knockout competition open to all the league's clubs and the Second Division Trophy, a knockout trophy competition for Division Two clubs only. The league also had a reserves team section.

== Division One ==
North West Counties Football League Division One
- Season: 2003–04
- Teams: 22
- Champions: Clitheroe
- Promoted: Clitheroe; Mossley; Warrington Town; Woodley Sports
- Relegated: None
- Matches: 462
- Goals: 1,553 (3.36 per match)

Division One featured 22 clubs, 19 remaining from the previous season plus 3 additions:

- Bacup Borough, promoted as Division Two champions
- Stone Dominoes, promoted as Division Two runners-up
- Trafford, relegated from the Northern Premier League Division One

During the season four clubs suffered points deductions for transgressing league rules: the most notable was Mossley who suffered a three point deduction for an administrative error without which they would have finished equal on points with champions Clitheroe and by reason of a better goal difference have taken the crown themselves.

At the end of the season owing to the impending creation of two divisions at levels 6 of the English football league system (the Football Conferences North and South) and the advancement of clubs into those divisions and consequently other clubs moving up the pyramid, four Division One clubs were promoted to the Northern Premier League Division One: the champions Clitheroe, runners-up Mossley and fourth and fifth placed clubs Woodley Sports and Warrington Town; third placed club Fleetwood Town were denied promotion as their ground did not meet the grade for the higher division. Owing to the reduction of clubs in the division (with four being promoted) no clubs were relegated.

=== League table ===
Pos	Team	Pld	W	D	L	GF	GA	GD	Pts	Season End Notes
1	Clitheroe (C, P)	42	29	5	8	88	55	+33	92	Promoted to Northern Premier; League Division One
2	Mossley (P)	42	28	8	6	109	54	+55	89 (Note: Mossley, Curzon Ashton and St Helens Town had 3 points deducted)	Promoted to Northern Premier; League Division One
3	Fleetwood Town	42	26	8	8	84	51	+33	86	
4	Woodley Sports (P)	42	26	5	11	99	56	+43	83	Promoted to Northern Premier; League Division One
5	Warrington Town (P)	42	20	10	12	72	59	+13	70	Promoted to Northern Premier; League Division One
6	Newcastle Town	42	21	6	15	94	67	+27	69	
7	Curzon Ashton	42	19	10	13	84	79	+5	64	
8	Skelmersdale United	42	19	6	17	79	64	+15	63	
9	Alsager Town	42	16	15	11	54	47	+7	63	
10	Stone Dominoes	42	18	8	16	57	60	−3	62	
11	Congleton Town	42	15	16	11	62	50	+12	61	
12	Atherton Laburnum Rovers	42	17	7	18	77	76	+1	58	
13	Nantwich Town	42	15	11	16	73	66	+7	56	
14	Bacup Borough	42	15	8	19	68	72	−4	53	
15	Salford City	42	14	11	17	62	66	−4	53	
16	Trafford	42	14	8	20	72	91	−19	50	
17	Ramsbottom United	42	12	12	18	71	92	−21	48	
18	Glossop North End	42	9	9	24	51	95	−44	36	
19	St Helens Town	42	10	6	26	51	81	−30	33	
20	Squires Gate	42	7	12	23	52	83	−31	33	
21	Abbey Hey	42	7	8	27	46	90	−44	29	
22	Atherton Collieries	42	6	9	27	48	99	−51	23 (Note: Atherton Collieries had 4 points deducted.)	

Source: NWCFL: Final Tables, Season 2003/04
Rules for classification: 1) points; 2) goal difference; 3) number of goals scored.
(C) Champions; (P) Promoted

== Division Two ==
North West Counties Football League Division Two
- Season: 2003–04
- Teams: 20
- Champions: Colne
- Promoted: Colne; Formby; Great Harwood Town; Maine Road
- Relegated: None
- Matches: 380
- Goals: 1,335 (3.51 per match)

Division Two featured 20 clubs, 16 remaining from the previous season plus 4 additions:

- Eccleshall, promoted as champions of the Midland Football League
- Flixton, relegated from Division One
- Formby, a league founder member club rejoined from the Liverpool County Football Combination following a one year absence.
- Winsford United, relegated from Division One

At the end of the season the champions Colne (who completed a Division Two league and cup double) and the clubs filling the next three places, Maine Road, Formby and Great Harwood Town, were promoted to Division One to replace those promoted to the Northern Premier League. The latter club benefitted from the late deduction of three points for fielding an ineligble player from Darwen who as a consequence dropped from fourth to sixth position. All the other 16 clubs remained in the division.

=== League table ===
Pos	Team	Pld	W	D	L	GF	GA	GD	Pts	Season End Notes
1	Colne (C, P)	38	26	6	6	102	41	+61	84	Promoted to Division One
2	Maine Road (P)	38	23	5	10	99	58	+41	74	Promoted to Division One
3	Formby (P)	38	21	9	8	86	48	+38	72	Promoted to Division One
4	Great Harwood Town (P)	38	15	14	9	68	44	+24	59	Promoted to Division One
5	Flixton	38	16	11	11	76	60	+16	59	
6	Darwen	38	17	11	10	81	67	+14	59 (Note: Darwen had 3 points deducted)	
7	Ashton Town	38	16	11	11	66	60	+6	59	
8	Winsford United	38	15	11	12	66	62	+4	56	
9	Holker Old Boys	38	15	8	15	82	76	+6	53	
10	Nelson	38	14	11	13	55	64	−9	53	
11	Leek County School Old Boys	38	14	8	16	72	63	+9	50	
12	Padiham	38	14	8	16	63	80	−17	50	
13	Oldham Town	38	13	9	16	69	74	−5	48	
14	Blackpool Mechanics	38	13	7	18	45	59	−14	46	
15	Norton United	38	11	12	15	66	72	−6	45	
16	Cheadle Town	38	12	9	17	55	69	−14	45	
17	Eccleshall	38	10	14	14	56	65	−9	44	
18	Chadderton	38	7	11	20	42	63	−21	32	
19	Daisy Hill	38	7	10	21	33	82	−49	31	
20	Castleton Gabriels	38	6	5	27	53	128	−75	23	

Source: Non-League Matters: North West Counties League 2000–2011
Rules for classification: 1) points; 2) goal difference; 3) number of goals scored.
(C) Champions; (P) Promoted

== League Challenge Cup ==
The 2003–04 League Challenge Cup was a knockout competition open to all the league's clubs. The all Division One club final, played at Southport F.C., was won 3–0 by Bacup Borough who defeated Newcastle Town.

Quarter-finals, Semi-finals and Final

(The semi-finals were decided on aggregate score from two legs played)

Quarter-finals
Clitheroe (D1)	0
Bacup Borough (D1)	1
Woodley Sports (D1)	0
Warrington Town (D1)	1
Ramsbottom United (D1)	2
Great Harwood Town (D2)	1
Mossley (D1)	1
Newcastle Town (D1)	2

Semi-finals
Bacup Borough (D1)	4	3	7
Warrington Town (D1)	1	2	3
Ramsbottom United (D1)	4	1	5
Newcastle Town (D1)	3	3	6

Final (Note: Played at Southport F.C.)
Bacup Borough (D1)	3
Newcastle Town (D1)	0

Club's division appended to team name: (D1)=Division One; (D2)=Division Two
source: "League Challenge Cup Fixtures/Results". nwcfl.co.uk. April 2004. Archived from the original on 19 June 2004.

== Second Division Trophy ==
The 2003–04 Second Division Trophy was a knockout competition for Division Two clubs only. In the final played at Clitheroe F.C. the winners, completing a league and cup double, were Colne who defeated Great Harwood Town 1–0.

Semi-finals and Final

(The semi-finals were decided on aggregate score from two legs played)

Semi-finals
Colne	2	0	2
Cheadle Town	1	0	1
Darwen	0	0	0
Great Harwood Town	0	2	2

Final (Note: Played at Clitheroe F.C.)
Colne	1
Great Harwood Town	0

sources:

- Semi-finals: "Division Two Trophy Fixtures/Results". nwcfl.co.uk. March 2004. Archived from the original on 30 April 2004.
- Final: Phil Simpson (7 May 2004). "Harwood old boy Paul fires Reds to double". Nelson Leader. Nelson. p. 86.

== Reserves Section ==
Main honours for the 2003–04 season:

- Reserves Division
  - Winners: Flixton Reserves
  - Runners-up: Clitheroe Reserves
- Reserves Division Cup
  - Winners: Glossop North End Reserves
  - Runners-up: Maine Road Reserves
