= 2004–05 North West Counties Football League =

The 2004–05 North West Counties Football League season (known as the Moore & Co Solicitors North West Counties Football League for sponsorship reasons) was the 23rd in the history of the North West Counties Football League, a football competition in England.

The league comprised two divisions, Division One and Division Two (at levels 9 and 10 of the English football league system, Steps 5 and 6 of the National League System respectively). Additionally there were two cup competitions: the League Challenge Cup knockout competition open to all the league's clubs and the Second Division Trophy, a knockout trophy competition for Division Two clubs only. The league also had a reserves team section.

== Division One ==
North West Counties Football League Division One
- Season: 2004–05
- Teams: 22
- Champions: Fleetwood Town
- Promoted: Fleetwood Town
- Relegated: Great Harwood Town
- Matches: 462
- Goals: 1,493 (3.23 per match)
- Average attendance: 105

Division One featured 22 clubs, 18 remaining from the previous season plus 4 additions (all promoted from Division Two):

- Colne,
- Formby
- Great Harwood Town
- Maine Road

At the end of the season the champions Fleetwood Town, who missed out the previous season owing to ground grading issues, were promoted to the Northern Premier League Division One. Only the bottom club Great Harwood Town, who had been promoted into the division this season, were relegated to Division Two – had they not suffered a four point deduction for fielding an ineligible player they would have finished two places higher and maintained their position in the division.

=== League table ===
Pos	Team	Pld	W	D	L	GF	GA	GD	Pts	Season End Notes
1	Fleetwood Town (C, P)	42	31	6	5	107	42	+65	99	Promoted to Northern Premier; League Division One
2	Newcastle Town	42	28	8	6	94	51	+43	92	
3	St Helens Town	42	21	13	8	75	48	+27	76	
4	Curzon Ashton	42	23	7	12	66	45	+21	76	
5	Ramsbottom United	42	22	9	11	70	47	+23	75	
6	Skelmersdale United	42	21	11	10	94	57	+37	74	
7	Alsager Town	42	19	11	12	65	47	+18	68	
8	Maine Road	42	20	7	15	76	69	+7	67	
9	Bacup Borough	42	19	8	15	52	47	+5	65	
10	Colne	42	18	10	14	75	61	+14	64	
11	Stone Dominoes	42	17	12	13	73	64	+9	63	
12	Trafford	42	16	8	18	69	59	+10	56	
13	Glossop North End	42	15	10	17	79	75	+4	55	
14	Abbey Hey	42	16	6	20	51	69	−18	54	
15	Atherton Laburnum Rovers	42	14	6	22	64	82	−18	48	
16	Nantwich Town	42	12	8	22	71	91	−20	44	
17	Squires Gate	42	12	8	22	38	64	−26	44	
18	Salford City	42	11	9	22	68	90	−22	42	
19	Congleton Town	42	9	7	26	54	88	−34	34	
20	Formby	42	8	8	26	47	99	−52	32	
21	Atherton Collieries	42	8	7	27	57	102	−45	31	
22	Great Harwood Town (R)	42	8	9	25	48	96	−48	29 (Note: Great Harwood Town had 4 points deducted)	Relegated to Division Two

Source: The FA Full Time: North West Counties Football League: Division One
Rules for classification: 1) points; 2) goal difference; 3) number of goals scored.
(C) Champions; (P) Promoted; (R) Relegated

== Division Two ==
North West Counties Football League Division Two
- Season: 2004–05
- Teams: 19
- Champions: Cammell Laird
- Promoted: Cammell Laird; Silsden
- Relegated: None
- Matches: 342
- Goals: 1,206 (3.53 per match)
- Average attendance: 71

Division Two featured 19 clubs, 16 remaining from the previous season plus 3 additions:

- Cammell Laird, promoted as a runners-up of the West Cheshire League
- New Mills, joined from the Manchester Football League
- Silsden, promoted as champions of the West Riding County Amateur League

At the end of the season the champions Cammell Laird and runners-up Silsden (who had both joined the league this season) were promoted to Division One. All the other 17 clubs remained in the division.

Cammell Laird completed an unprecedented treble of winning the Division Two title, Division Two Trophy and League Challenge Cup. Also with 142 league goals scored from 36 matches they broke the league record for the highest number of goals scored by a club in a season, exceeding the total from the 1997–98 season of Kidsgrove Athletic (127 goals from 42 matches). Additionally they created a league first as, with a goal difference of 108, they were the first club to finish the season with a positive goal difference greater than 100.

=== League table ===
Pos	Team	Pld	W	D	L	GF	GA	GD	Pts	Season End Notes
1	Cammell Laird (C, P)	36	27	6	3	142	34	+108	87	Promoted to Division One
2	Silsden (P)	36	25	5	6	93	42	+51	77 (Note: Silsden, Norton United, Blackpool Mechanics and Cheadle Town had 3 points deducted)	Promoted to Division One
3	Winsford United	36	23	7	6	72	28	+44	76	
4	Padiham	36	21	7	8	84	56	+28	70	
5	Norton United	36	17	12	7	63	40	+23	60	
6	Nelson	36	16	11	9	75	52	+23	59	
7	Ashton Town	36	13	8	15	61	62	−1	47	
8	Daisy Hill	36	12	10	14	61	68	−7	46	
9	New Mills	36	13	6	17	51	74	−23	45	
10	Blackpool Mechanics	36	12	9	15	49	67	−18	42	
11	Eccleshall	36	11	8	17	47	58	−11	41	
12	Cheadle Town	36	11	7	18	47	80	−33	40	
13	Oldham Town	36	10	12	14	54	56	−2	39	
14	Leek County School Old Boys	36	9	10	17	59	68	−9	37	
15	Holker Old Boys	36	10	7	19	65	81	−16	37	
16	Darwen	36	13	5	18	39	56	−17	35 (Note: Darwen had 9 points deducted)	
17	Chadderton	36	7	7	22	40	94	−54	28	
18	Flixton	36	14	6	16	72	79	−7	27 (Note: Flixton had 21 points deducted for 'player irregularities')	
19	Castleton Gabriels	36	4	5	27	32	111	−79	17	

Source: NWCFL: Final Tables, Season 2004/05
Rules for classification: 1) points; 2) goal difference; 3) number of goals scored.
(C) Champions; (P) Promoted

== League Challenge Cup ==
The 2004–05 League Challenge Cup was a knockout competition open to all the league's clubs. The final, played at Bury F.C., was won 2–0 by league newcomers Division Two club Cammell Laird who defeated Division One Skelmersdale United. It was part of a treble of North West Counties League titles won by Cammell Laird and the first occasion in four seasons that a Division Two club had won this cup.

Quarter-finals, Semi-finals and Final

(The semi-finals were decided on aggregate score from two legs played)

Quarter-finals
Fleetwood Town (D1)
Colne (D1)
Cammell Laird (D2)
Bacup Borough (D1)
Skelmersdale United (D1)
St Helens Town (D1)
Abbey Hey (D1)
Blackpool Mechanics (D2)

Semi-finals
Fleetwood Town (D1)	1	0	1
Cammell Laird (D2)	0	2	2
Skelmersdale United (D1)	4	0	4
Blackpool Mechanics (D2)	0	2	2

Final (Note: Played at Bury F.C.)
Cammell Laird (D2)	2
Skelmersdale United (D1)	0

Club's division appended to team name: (D1)=Division One; (D2)=Division Two
sources:

- Quarter-finals: "League Challenge Cup Fixtures/Results". nwcfl.co.uk. February 2005. Archived from the original on 8 February 2005.
- Semi-finals:Andrew Moffatt (11 April 2005). "Football: Laird to meet Skem in cup final". The Free Library: Daily Post (Liverpool).
- Final: Andrew Moffatt (30 April 2005). "Football: Record-breaking Laird's treble". The Free Library: Daily Post (Liverpool).

== Second Division Trophy ==
The 2004–05 Second Division Trophy was a knockout competition for Division Two clubs only. In the final the winners, completing a Division Two league and cup double as part of a treble of North West Counties League titles, were league newcomers Cammell Laird who defeated Flixton 4–0.

Semi-finals and Final

(The semi-finals were decided on aggregate score from two legs played)

Semi-finals
Cammell Laird
Silsden
Ashton Town
Flixton

Final
Cammell Laird	4
Flixton	0

sources:

- Semi-finals: "Division Two Trophy Fixtures". nwcfl.co.uk. February 2005. Archived from the original on 8 February 2005.
- Final: Andrew Moffatt (4 April 2005). "Football: Skem put one foot in third cup final". The Free Library: Daily Post (Liverpool).

== Reserves Section ==
Main honours for the 2004–05 season:

- Reserves Division
  - Winners: Skelmersdale United Reserves
  - Runners-up: New Mills Reserves
- Reserves Division Cup
  - Winners: Colne Reserves
  - Runners-up: Squires Gate Reserves
