= 2006–07 Northern Premier League =

The 2006–07 Northern Premier League season was the 39th in the history of the Northern Premier League, a football competition in England. Teams were divided into two divisions; the Premier and the First. After this season, Division One was split into two leagues: the Northern Premier League Division One North and the Northern Premier League Division One South.

== Premier Division ==
Northern Premier League Premier Division
- Season: 2006–07
- Champions: Burscough
- Promoted: Burscough; A.F.C. Telford United
- Relegated: Grantham Town; Mossley; Radcliffe Borough
- Matches: 465
- Goals: 1,332 (2.86 per match)

The Premier Division featured five new clubs:

- Fleetwood Town promoted as runner-up from NPL Division One
- Grantham Town transferred from Southern League Premier Division
- Hednesford Town, relegated from the Conference North
- Kendal Town, promoted via play-offs from NPL Division One
- Mossley, promoted as champions from NPL Division One

=== League table ===
Pos	Team	Pld	W	D	L	GF	GA	GD	Pts	Promotion or relegation
1	Burscough (C, P)	42	23	12	7	80	37	+43	80 (Note: Burscough deducted 1 point)	Promotion to Conference North
2	Witton Albion	42	24	8	10	90	48	+42	80	Qualification for Play-offs
3	A.F.C. Telford United (P)	42	21	15	6	72	40	+32	78	Qualification for Play-offs
4	Marine	42	22	8	12	70	53	+17	74	Qualification for Play-offs
5	Matlock Town	42	21	9	12	70	43	+27	72	Qualification for Play-offs
6	Guiseley	42	19	12	11	71	49	+22	69	
7	Hednesford Town	42	18	14	10	49	41	+8	68	
8	Fleetwood Town	42	19	10	13	71	60	+11	67	
9	Gateshead	42	17	14	11	75	57	+18	65	
10	Ossett Town	42	18	10	14	61	52	+9	64	
11	Whitby Town	42	18	6	18	63	78	−15	60	
12	Ilkeston Town	42	16	11	15	66	62	+4	59	
13	North Ferriby United	42	15	9	18	54	61	−7	54	
14	Prescot Cables	42	13	14	15	52	56	−4	53	
15	Lincoln United	42	12	15	15	40	58	−18	51	
16	Frickley Athletic	42	13	10	19	50	69	−19	49	
17	Leek Town	42	13	9	20	49	61	−12	48	
18	Ashton United	42	13	9	20	52	72	−20	48	
19	Kendal Town	42	12	11	19	59	79	−20	47	
20	Mossley (R)	42	10	5	27	48	79	−31	35	Relegation to NPL Division One North
21	Radcliffe Borough (R)	42	7	11	24	39	71	−32	32	Relegation to NPL Division One North
22	Grantham Town (R)	42	3	8	31	39	94	−55	17	Relegation to NPL Division One South

Updated to match(es) played on 8 February 2011. Source:
Rules for classification: 1) points; 2) goal difference; 3) number of goals scored.
(C) Champions; (P) Promoted; (R) Relegated

=== Results ===
Home \ Away	TEL	ASH	BUR	FLE	FRK	GAT	GRN	GUI	HED	ILK	KEN	LEE	LIN	MAR	MAT	MOS	NFU	OST	PRC	RAD	WTB	WTN
A.F.C. Telford United		0–0	1–2	2–2	4–1	4–0	1–1	3–2	0–0	1–1	2–2	5–1	1–1	1–1	3–1	0–0	2–1	4–1	2–1	1–1	1–2	3–1
Ashton United	0–5		2–1	3–0	1–0	0–3	1–0	3–0	3–4	1–1	3–3	1–4	2–0	2–4	1–1	1–0	0–3	2–3	2–1	2–1	1–2	2–1
Burscough	0–0	3–2		4–1	5–2	2–0	3–0	1–0	2–0	1–1	8–2	2–0	0–2	0–0	0–0	4–0	3–2	4–0	1–0	2–2	4–0	1–0
Fleetwood Town	3–0	1–1	1–0		2–2	1–0	4–1	1–2	1–2	4–1	2–1	2–1	2–0	2–3	1–1	0–1	4–1	1–0	4–0	0–3	3–1	2–0
Frickley Athletic	0–1	2–0	1–2	1–3		1–1	1–1	2–0	0–2	0–2	2–1	3–1	2–0	1–2	2–0	0–4	1–1	0–0	1–1	2–2	3–2	2–1
Gateshead	4–3	2–3	1–0	3–3	2–3		5–2	0–1	2–3	2–1	1–1	2–1	2–2	2–0	3–2	2–0	0–0	2–1	2–3	3–1	0–0	1–0
Grantham Town	0–1	1–1	0–3	0–2	0–0	0–6		0–1	1–2	0–4	2–1	3–1	1–2	2–1	0–2	1–2	0–5	1–3	0–1	0–0	2–3	2–3
Guiseley	0–1	2–1	1–1	1–1	5–1	1–1	2–0		1–1	3–3	2–1	1–2	1–1	3–1	2–1	5–1	1–1	1–2	3–1	2–1	5–0	1–3
Hednesford Town	0–1	0–0	2–2	2–1	2–1	1–1	2–0	2–2		3–0	2–1	1–0	2–1	0–2	1–2	0–0	1–1	1–1	1–0	0–0	3–0	0–1
Ilkeston Town	1–1	2–1	2–2	2–2	1–2	4–2	2–1	1–2	2–0		2–2	2–0	0–1	0–2	1–3	2–1	1–1	0–2	0–2	1–2	3–0	0–0
Kendal Town	1–1	2–1	1–3	4–1	2–0	1–1	2–0	0–3	2–3	0–3		0–1	0–1	0–2	1–5	3–1	1–0	0–0	3–3	3–1	1–0	1–5
Leek Town	0–1	1–0	1–1	1–2	0–1	0–2	4–2	1–1	2–1	2–1	0–1		0–1	2–1	1–0	1–2	1–0	0–3	1–1	0–0	2–2	1–2
Lincoln United	0–4	1–1	1–1	1–1	1–1	2–4	1–0	0–0	0–0	0–2	1–1	1–2		1–2	0–0	2–0	2–0	0–0	2–2	0–1	1–0	1–0
Marine	0–2	2–1	2–3	2–0	1–2	1–1	1–0	1–0	1–1	2–1	1–1	1–1	4–1		1–2	1–0	4–1	3–2	1–0	2–1	3–1	2–2
Matlock Town	2–1	0–0	1–3	1–1	3–0	0–0	3–2	0–3	0–1	0–1	5–1	1–0	2–0	1–2		4–1	2–0	1–0	3–0	3–2	5–1	1–1
Mossley	3–4	1–2	3–2	0–1	1–2	0–4	3–2	1–3	1–1	2–3	0–2	1–0	1–2	1–3	0–3		1–2	0–2	0–0	2–0	2–0	1–2
North Ferriby United	1–2	3–0	0–2	4–1	3–2	3–1	2–2	0–2	1–0	1–1	4–1	1–5	1–1	1–0	0–2	2–1		0–2	0–1	1–0	2–0	0–4
Ossett Town	0–0	2–1	0–0	2–4	2–0	2–2	2–2	1–0	0–1	1–2	2–1	2–0	1–3	1–1	2–1	3–2	1–2		2–1	4–0	2–2	1–2
Prescot Cables	0–1	1–0	1–2	3–1	1–1	1–1	2–1	2–0	0–0	1–4	2–2	2–2	3–0	2–1	1–3	2–2	0–0	2–1		3–0	0–1	1–1
Radcliffe Borough	1–1	2–0	1–0	0–2	1–0	0–2	2–1	1–2	0–1	1–3	1–3	0–0	3–3	1–3	1–1	1–3	0–2	0–2	1–1		2–4	0–2
Whitby Town	1–0	2–3	1–0	0–0	3–2	2–1	3–1	2–2	2–0	4–1	1–0	2–2	2–0	2–1	1–2	3–2	4–1	0–2	1–2	3–2		0–2
Witton Albion	0–1	5–1	0–0	3–1	2–0	1–1	4–4	2–2	3–0	4–1	1–3	3–4	6–0	5–2	1–0	2–1	2–0	3–1	2–1	1–0	7–2	

Updated to match(es) played on 28 April 2007. Source: Northern Premier Division results grid
Legend: Blue = home team win; Yellow = draw; Red = away team win.

=== Play-offs ===
The Premier Division play-offs saw the second to fifth placed sides in the Division compete for one place in the Conference North.

Semifinals
2	Witton Albion	4
5	Matlock Town	2
3	A.F.C. Telford United	2
4	Marine	0

Final
2	Witton Albion	1
3	A.F.C. Telford United	3

=== Locations ===
Locations of the 2006–07 Northern Premier League teams

== Division One ==
Northern Premier League Division One
- Season: 2006–07
- Champions: Buxton
- Promoted: Buxton; Eastwood Town
- Relegated: None
- Matches: 555
- Goals: 1,732 (3.12 per match)

Division One featured seven new clubs:

- Bradford Park Avenue, relegated from the NPL Premier Division
- Wakefield, relegated from the NPL Premier Division
- Cammell Laird promoted as champions from North West Counties League Division One
- Skelmersdale United promoted as runners-up from North West Counties League Division One
- Alsager Town promoted as third place from North West Counties League Division One
- Buxton promoted as champions from Northern Counties East League Premier Division
- Harrogate Railway Athletic promoted as third place from Northern Counties East League Premier Division

=== League table ===
Pos	Team	Pld	W	D	L	GF	GA	GD	Pts	Promotion, qualification or relegation
1	Buxton (C, P)	46	30	11	5	94	37	+57	101	Promotion to NPL Premier Division
2	Cammell Laird	46	28	10	8	105	56	+49	94	Qualification for Play-offs, then allocated to Division One South
3	Eastwood Town (P)	46	26	9	11	89	43	+46	87	Qualification for Play-offs, then promoted to the NPL Premier Division (Note: Four teams played for one spot and promotion to the NPL Premier Division.)
4	Bradford Park Avenue	46	24	10	12	77	47	+30	82	Qualification for Play-offs, then allocated to Division One North
5	Colwyn Bay	46	22	11	13	74	65	+9	77	Qualification for Play-offs, then allocated to Division One South
6	Stocksbridge Park Steels	46	22	10	14	82	49	+33	76	Allocated to Division One South
7	Goole	46	21	9	16	80	84	−4	72	Allocated to Division One South
8	Kidsgrove Athletic	46	21	7	18	91	80	+11	70	Allocated to Division One South
9	Rossendale United	46	21	7	18	64	59	+5	70	Allocated to Division One North
10	Woodley Sports	46	19	11	16	89	71	+18	68	Allocated to Division One North
11	Ossett Albion	46	19	11	16	71	66	+5	68	Allocated to Division One North
12	Harrogate Railway Athletic	46	21	5	20	72	78	−6	68	Allocated to Division One North
13	Bamber Bridge	46	18	8	20	78	75	+3	62	Allocated to Division One North
14	Alsager Town	46	18	7	21	72	75	−3	61	Allocated to Division One South
15	Skelmersdale United	46	17	10	19	72	77	−5	61	Allocated to Division One North
16	Clitheroe	46	18	6	22	78	75	+3	60	Allocated to Division One North
17	Brigg Town	46	16	10	20	57	72	−15	58	Allocated to Division One South
18	Gresley Rovers	46	16	7	23	59	75	−16	55	Allocated to Division One South
19	Belper Town	46	17	4	25	58	86	−28	55	Allocated to Division One South
20	Shepshed Dynamo	46	15	7	24	62	96	−34	52	Allocated to Division One South
21	Wakefield	46	13	10	23	48	71	−23	49	Allocated to Division One North
22	Warrington Town	46	13	8	25	64	84	−20	47	Allocated to Division One South
23	Chorley	46	10	6	30	52	99	−47	36	Allocated to Division One North
24	Bridlington Town	46	3	14	29	33	101	−68	23	Allocated to Division One North

Updated to match(es) played on 8 February 2011. Source: .
Rules for classification: 1) points; 2) goal difference; 3) number of goals scored.
(C) Champions; (P) Promoted

=== Results ===
Home \ Away	ALS	BAM	BLP	BPA	BRI	BRG	BUX	CAM	CHO	CLT	COL	EAS	GOO	GRE	HRA	KID	OSA	ROS	SPD	SKU	STO	WAK	WAR	WDL
Alsager Town		5–4	2–1	2–0	3–0	0–3	1–3	1–4	5–0	0–2	0–1	2–3	2–3	1–3	2–2	0–3	1–1	1–0	0–2	2–0	1–1	3–1	1–1	1–1
Bamber Bridge	2–2		3–4	1–1	2–0	2–3	1–3	1–1	0–3	3–1	0–1	4–3	0–2	4–1	2–0	2–1	1–3	5–0	3–0	4–1	0–3	0–1	3–0	4–3
Belper Town	2–1	1–0		1–3	2–1	2–1	1–4	1–2	3–1	0–3	1–0	1–0	1–3	1–0	2–0	5–4	2–5	1–2	2–1	0–1	0–0	2–0	0–2	2–2
Bradford Park Avenue	4–1	1–0	4–0		2–0	3–1	0–0	3–1	3–0	7–3	0–0	1–3	3–1	1–2	1–0	1–0	2–2	0–0	5–0	1–1	2–1	1–0	2–1	0–3
Bridlington Town	0–4	0–3	0–2	0–1		1–1	0–5	0–3	2–0	2–2	1–1	0–5	2–2	0–3	1–2	3–2	0–2	1–1	1–2	1–2	1–9	1–1	1–2	2–1
Brigg Town	2–0	2–1	2–1	0–1	0–0		2–2	0–3	1–0	1–0	1–5	4–3	1–3	1–1	2–1	0–1	3–2	1–0	3–1	1–0	0–2	1–2	3–2	1–1
Buxton	1–0	4–1	0–2	2–0	3–0	3–1		3–1	4–0	1–0	2–2	1–1	3–0	2–0	5–0	2–0	0–1	2–1	2–0	0–1	1–0	1–1	3–2	1–0
Cammell Laird	1–2	2–2	2–1	3–1	2–2	1–0	2–3		4–1	2–0	3–2	3–3	2–3	2–0	3–0	3–2	3–1	2–0	4–2	2–2	3–1	4–0	5–1	0–0
Chorley	0–6	2–2	1–1	0–2	2–2	2–1	0–1	1–1		2–2	0–1	0–4	1–3	3–1	0–2	2–5	0–2	3–0	6–1	3–1	1–2	3–0	0–1	0–1
Clitheroe	1–0	1–2	3–2	1–3	3–0	3–1	2–2	2–4	3–0		1–3	0–3	1–2	2–0	1–2	5–1	1–0	0–2	5–0	0–1	0–5	1–1	5–1	3–1
Colwyn Bay	1–0	0–1	2–2	1–0	1–1	4–2	2–0	2–1	2–0	2–1		1–2	5–2	1–0	3–2	2–2	3–0	1–1	2–0	3–3	1–1	1–0	0–2	2–2
Eastwood Town	2–1	1–2	3–0	1–0	0–0	6–0	0–0	0–2	1–0	2–1	2–1		2–2	2–1	1–2	3–0	1–1	1–0	5–0	2–1	1–0	0–1	1–0	2–2
Goole	0–1	2–2	3–0	4–0	1–1	0–0	2–2	0–5	6–3	0–3	4–0	0–0		4–2	1–1	2–3	2–1	0–4	2–1	0–4	1–3	1–3	3–1	2–1
Gresley	2–0	1–2	4–0	0–1	1–1	1–1	0–0	4–1	2–1	1–0	2–2	0–5	1–4		1–0	2–3	1–2	1–4	2–0	1–2	1–1	2–1	3–1	4–5
Harrogate Railway Athletic	1–2	1–1	2–0	2–1	0–0	0–3	4–3	0–3	6–1	2–1	5–1	1–0	0–1	3–1		2–3	0–2	3–2	3–2	2–0	3–3	1–0	2–4	1–0
Kidsgrove Athletic	4–3	1–0	4–1	1–2	2–0	2–1	1–2	1–4	1–2	1–3	2–3	2–1	0–1	3–0	3–0		4–2	1–1	0–1	1–1	1–0	1–2	3–1	3–2
Ossett Albion	1–3	2–1	1–3	1–1	1–0	1–1	1–4	1–2	0–2	1–3	1–0	0–2	1–0	1–2	3–0	1–1		2–2	3–2	4–1	1–0	1–1	2–1	3–2
Rossendale United	0–0	0–1	2–0	0–5	2–0	1–0	1–3	0–1	3–2	0–1	4–1	1–2	2–2	3–0	1–5	2–2	2–1		0–1	4–1	2–1	0–1	4–2	2–0
Shepshed Dynamo	1–2	2–2	3–1	1–0	3–1	0–0	1–4	1–1	2–0	1–3	3–2	2–1	1–2	1–2	1–2	2–2	2–2	0–1		0–0	1–3	1–1	3–2	2–0
Skelmersdale United	6–3	3–2	2–0	2–2	4–1	3–1	0–1	3–2	2–1	2–2	0–3	0–1	3–0	1–2	1–0	3–2	0–3	0–1	1–2		1–1	1–2	3–1	1–1
Stocksbridge Park Steels	0–1	2–0	2–0	0–3	2–0	1–3	1–1	1–1	3–0	4–2	0–1	1–0	3–0	1–0	4–0	1–3	1–0	3–2	6–2	0–0		2–0	2–1	1–2
Wakefield	0–1	0–1	0–2	2–2	3–0	2–1	0–1	1–2	3–1	2–0	1–2	0–4	1–3	1–0	1–3	2–2	1–1	0–1	0–2	4–2	1–1		1–2	1–3
Warrington Town	1–2	3–0	2–1	0–0	2–1	0–0	1–1	0–1	0–0	1–1	3–0	2–4	4–0	0–1	1–3	0–3	1–2	0–1	1–3	3–2	3–1	2–2		2–4
Woodley Sports	4–1	2–1	3–1	2–1	4–2	2–0	0–3	1–1	1–2	2–0	4–0	0–0	4–1	0–0	4–1	2–4	0–3	0–1	6–3	5–3	1–2	4–0	1–1	

Updated to match(es) played on 28 April 2007. Source: Northern Premier League First Division results grid
Legend: Blue = home team win; Yellow = draw; Red = away team win.

=== Play-offs ===
The First Division play-offs saw the second to fifth placed sides in the First Division compete for a place in the Premier Division.

Semifinals
2	Cammell Laird	3
5	Colwyn Bay	2
3	Eastwood Town	3
4	Bradford Park Avenue	0

Final
2	Cammell Laird	1
3	Eastwood Town	2

== Cup results ==
Challenge Cup: Teams from both divisions.

- Fleetwood Town 1–0 Matlock Town

President's Cup: 'Plate' competition for losing teams in the NPL Cup.

- Buxton 3–1 Wakefield

Chairman's Cup: 'Plate' competition for losing teams in the NPL Cup.

- Guiseley 2–1 Cammell Laird

Peter Swales Shield: Between Champions of NPL Premier Division and Champions of NPL First Division.

- Burscough 3–1 Fleetwood Town
