= Alsager Town F.C. =

Association football club in England

Coordinates: 53°06′07″N 2°18′00″W

Alsager Town
- Full name: Alsager Town Football Club
- Nickname: The Bullets
- Founded: 1968
- Ground: Wood Park Stadium, Alsager
- Capacity: 3,500 (250 seated)
- Chairman: Terry Greer
- Manager: Wayne Smith and Josh Probert
- League: North West Counties League Division One South
- 2025–26: North West Counties League Division One South, 16th of 18
- Website: https://www.alsagertownfc.co.uk/
| Home colours | Away colours |

Alsager Town Football Club is a football club, based in Alsager, Cheshire, England. The club are currently members of North West Counties League Division One South and play at Wood Park Stadium. Affiliated to the Cheshire County Football Association, they also operate a reserve team in the Staffordshire County Senior League and a youth team in the North West Youth Alliance.

== History ==
Established in 1968, the club joined the Mid-Cheshire League in the 1971–72 season. In 1973 they were renamed Alsager Town, a name they retained until 1985 when they became Alsager United. In 1988 the club reverted to its original name. They finished as runners-up in the Mid-Cheshire League in 1987–88, but left the league at the end of the season as they disbanded.

The club reformed in 1989 and joined the Premier Division of the Crewe League. Two years later they moved up to the Mid-Cheshire League in 1991 and were placed in Division Two. After playing in the league for seven seasons, they switched to the Midland Football League in 1998. They finished as runners-up in their first season, earning promotion to Division Two of the North West Counties League. In 2001 the club were renamed for a fifth time, becoming Alsager Town again. They finished second in Division Two in North West Counties League, earning promotion to Division One. They won the Leek Cup in the same season.

The 2005–06 season saw Alsager finish third in Division One, resulting in promotion to Division One of the Northern Premier League (NPL). At the end of their first season in the NPL the league added an extra division, resulting in Alsager Town being placed in Division One South. Although they finished fourteenth in the eighteen-club division in 2007–08, the club were relegated back into the renamed Premier Division of the North West Counties League after failing ground grading criteria.

Alsager remained in the Premier Division until the end of the 2015–16 season when they were relegated to Division One. When the division was split in 2018, they were placed in Division One South

=== League history ===
| Season | Division | Position | FA Cup | FA Trophy | FA Vase | Significant events |
|---|---|---|---|---|---|---|
| 1968–69 | Crewe League | | – | – | – | |
| 1969–70 | Crewe League | | – | – | – | |
| 1970–71 | Crewe League | | – | – | – | |
| 1971–72 | Mid-Cheshire League | 12/18 | – | – | – | |
| 1972–73 | Mid-Cheshire League | 12/18 | – | – | – | Renamed Alsager Town. |
| 1973–74 | Mid-Cheshire League | 12/19 | – | – | – | |
| 1974–75 | Mid-Cheshire League | 10/20 | – | – | – | League expanded, placed in Division One |
| 1975–76 | Mid-Cheshire League Division One | 16/17 | – | – | – | |
| 1976–77 | Mid-Cheshire League Division One | 10/16 | – | – | – | |
| 1977–78 | Mid-Cheshire League Division One | 4/16 | – | – | – | |
| 1978–79 | Mid-Cheshire League Division One | 3/16 | – | – | – | |
| 1979–80 | Mid-Cheshire League Division One | 9/16 | – | – | – | |
| 1980–81 | Mid-Cheshire League Division One | 6/16 | – | – | – | |
| 1981–82 | Mid-Cheshire League Division One | 15/16 | – | – | – | |
| 1982–83 | Mid-Cheshire League Division One | 13/15 | – | – | – | Divisions abolished |
| 1983–84 | Mid-Cheshire League | 3/18 | – | – | – | |
| 1984–85 | Mid-Cheshire League | 7/17 | – | – | – | |
| 1985–86 | Mid-Cheshire League | 6/18 | – | – | – | Renamed Alsager United |
| 1986–87 | Mid-Cheshire League | 5/17 | – | – | – | League expanded, placed in Division One |
| 1987–88 | Mid-Cheshire League Division One | 2/16 | – | – | – | Renamed Alsager |
| 1988–89 | Did not compete | | | | | |
| 1989–90 | Crewe League Premier Division | | – | – | – | |
| 1990–91 | Crewe League Premier Division | | – | – | – | |
| 1991–92 | Mid-Cheshire League Division Two | 5/17 | – | – | – | |
| 1992–93 | Mid-Cheshire League Division Two | 9/18 | – | – | – | |
| 1993–94 | Mid-Cheshire League Division Two | 15/17 | – | – | – | |
| 1994–95 | Mid-Cheshire League Division Two | 8/18 | – | – | – | |
| 1995–96 | Mid-Cheshire League Division Two | 3/16 | – | – | – | |
| 1996–97 | Mid-Cheshire League Division Two | 5/16 | – | – | – | |
| 1997–98 | Mid-Cheshire League Division Two | 8/15 | – | – | – | |
| 1998–99 | Midland League | 2/20 | – | – | – | Promoted |
| 1999–00 | North West Counties League Division Two | 12/18 | – | – | – | |
| 2000–01 | North West Counties League Division Two | 7/20 | – | – | – | Renamed Alsager Town |
| 2001–02 | North West Counties League Division Two | 2/21 | – | – | – | Promoted |
| 2002–03 | North West Counties League Division One | 11/22 | – | – | Q2 | |
| 2003–04 | North West Counties League Division One | 9/22 | P | – | R2 | |
| 2004–05 | North West Counties League Division One | 7/22 | Q1 | – | Q2 | |
| 2005–06 | North West Counties League Division One | 3/22 | EP | – | Q2 | Promoted |
| 2006–07 | Northern Premier League Division One | 14/24 | Q1 | Q2 | – | League expanded, placed in Division One South |
| 2007–08 | Northern Premier League Division One South | 14/18 | P | P | – | Relegated |
| 2008–09 | North West Counties League Premier Division | 7/22 | EP | – | R2 | |
| 2009–10 | North West Counties League Premier Division | 18/22 | EP | – | R2 | |
| 2010–11 | North West Counties League Premier Division | 20/22 | EP | – | Q2 | |
| 2011–12 | North West Counties League Premier Division | 13/22 | EP | – | Q1 | |
| 2012–13 | North West Counties League Premier Division | 15/22 | EP | – | Q2 | |
| 2013–14 | North West Counties League Premier Division | 18/22 | EP | – | Q2 | |
| 2014–15 | North West Counties League Premier Division | 17/21 | EP | – | Q1 | |
| 2015–16 | North West Counties League Premier Division | 20/22 | Q1 | – | R3 | Relegated |
| 2016–17 | North West Counties League Division One | 7/22 | P | – | Q2 | |
| 2017–18 | North West Counties League Division One | 8/22 | EP | – | R2 | |
| 2018–19 | North West Counties League Division One South | 17/20 | – | – | Q1 | |
| 2019–20 | North West Counties League Division One South | – | – | – | R1 | Season abandoned due to COVID-19 pandemic |
| 2020–21 | North West Counties League Division One South | – | – | – | Q1 | Season abandoned due to COVID-19 pandemic |
Source: Football Club History Database

== Ground ==
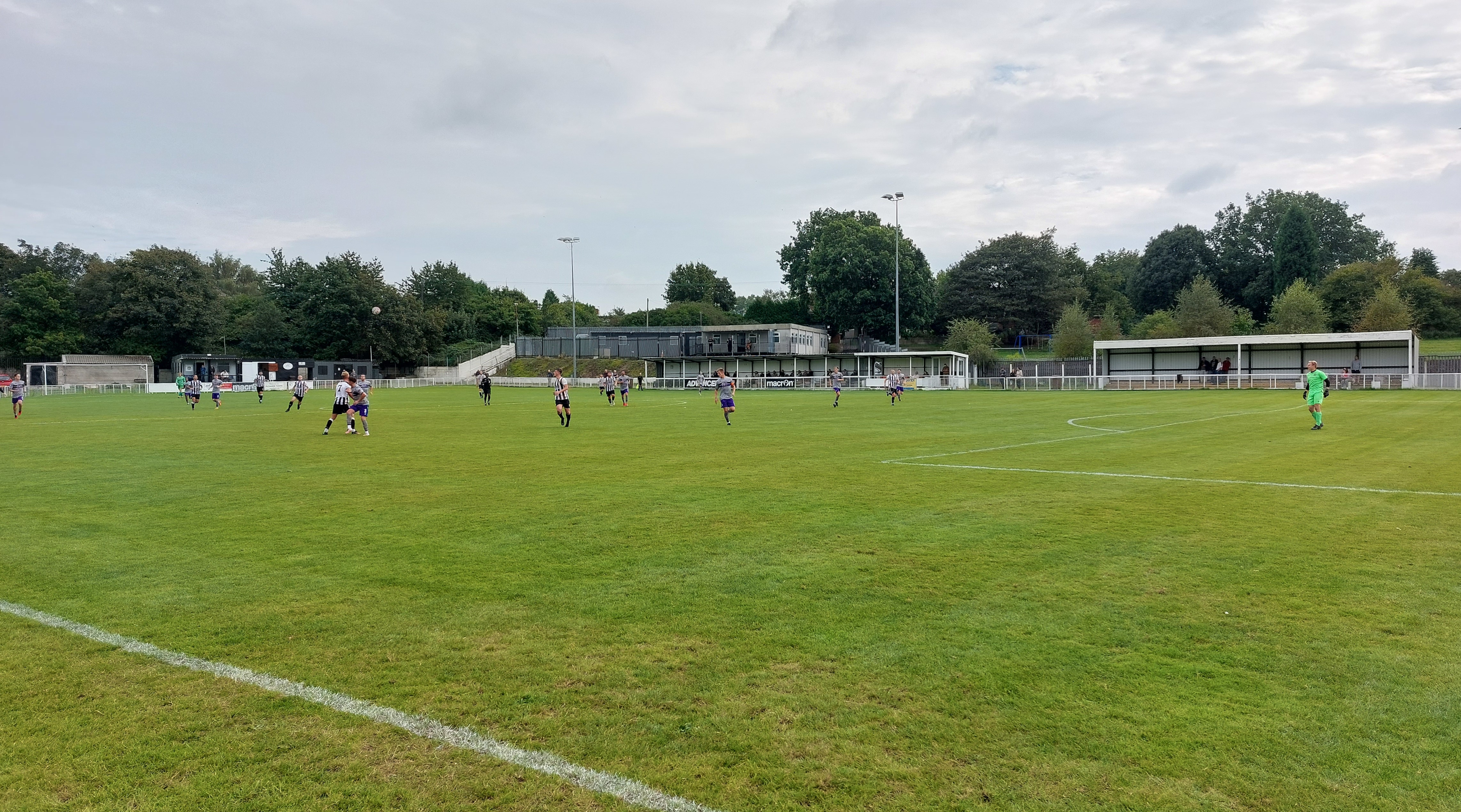
Wood Park in 2023

Alsager have played at Wood Park Stadium, originally known as the Town Ground, since 1968. The clubhouse suffered considerable damage by fire in July 2011, resulting in them largely playing away from home until November that year. The stadium currently has a capacity of 3,000, of which 250 is seated and 1,000 covered.

== Honours ==
- Leek Cup
  - Winners 2001–02

== Records ==
- Best FA Cup performance: First qualifying round, 2004–05, 2006–07, 2015–16
- Best FA Trophy performance: Second qualifying round, 2006–07
- Best FA Vase performance: Third round, 2015–16
- Record attendance: 606 vs Whitley Bay, FA Vase second round, 14 November 2009
- Record defeat: 12–1 vs Altrincham, Cheshire Senior Cup, 8 February 2011
- Record victory: 7–0 vs St. Martins, North West Counties Football League Division One South, 27 November 2021

== See also ==
- Alsager Town F.C. players
