= Sunderland Nissan F.C. =

Sunderland Nissan FC
- Full name: Sunderland Nissan Football Club
- Nickname(s): The Motormen
- Founded: 1988 (as Nissan)
- Dissolved: 2009
- Ground: The Nissan Sports Complex, Sunderland
- Chairman: H. English
- League: Northern Football League; Division One
- 2008–09: Northern Football League; Division One, 5th

Sunderland Nissan F.C. was a football club based in Sunderland, England. They joined the Wearside League Division Two as founding members in 1988. Their original name was Washington Nissan. In the 2005–06 and 2008–09 seasons, they reached the 2nd round of the FA Vase. For the 2008–09 season, their last, they were members of the Northern League Division One. They played at the Nissan Sports Complex. All of their players were employees of the Nissan Motor Manufacturing Plant NMUK in Sunderland.

In 2009 the club dissolved when the company stopped further funds to the club.

== Honours ==
- Northern League Div 2: R-Up: 2004–05
- Northern League Cup: R-Up: 2006–07
- Wearside: 1993–94, 99–2000, 01–02
- Div 2: R-Up: 1989–90
- League Cup: 1992–93, 93–94, 96–97, R-Up: 1991–92, 98–99
- Monkwearmouth Charity Cup: 1996–97 R-Up: 1995–96, 2000–01
- Nissan European Trophy: (x3)
