= Cammell Laird 1907 F.C. =

Association football club in England

Coordinates: 53.369°N 3.002°W

Cammell Laird
- Full name: Cammell Laird 1907 Football Club
- Nicknames: The Lairds, The Camels, The Shipyarders
- Founded: 1907
- Ground: Kirklands, Birkenhead
- Capacity: 2,000 (150 seated)
- Chairman: Alf Roberts
- Manager: Andy Cass
- League: North West Counties League Division One South
- 2024–25: North West Counties League Division One South, 10th of 18
| Home colours | Away colours |

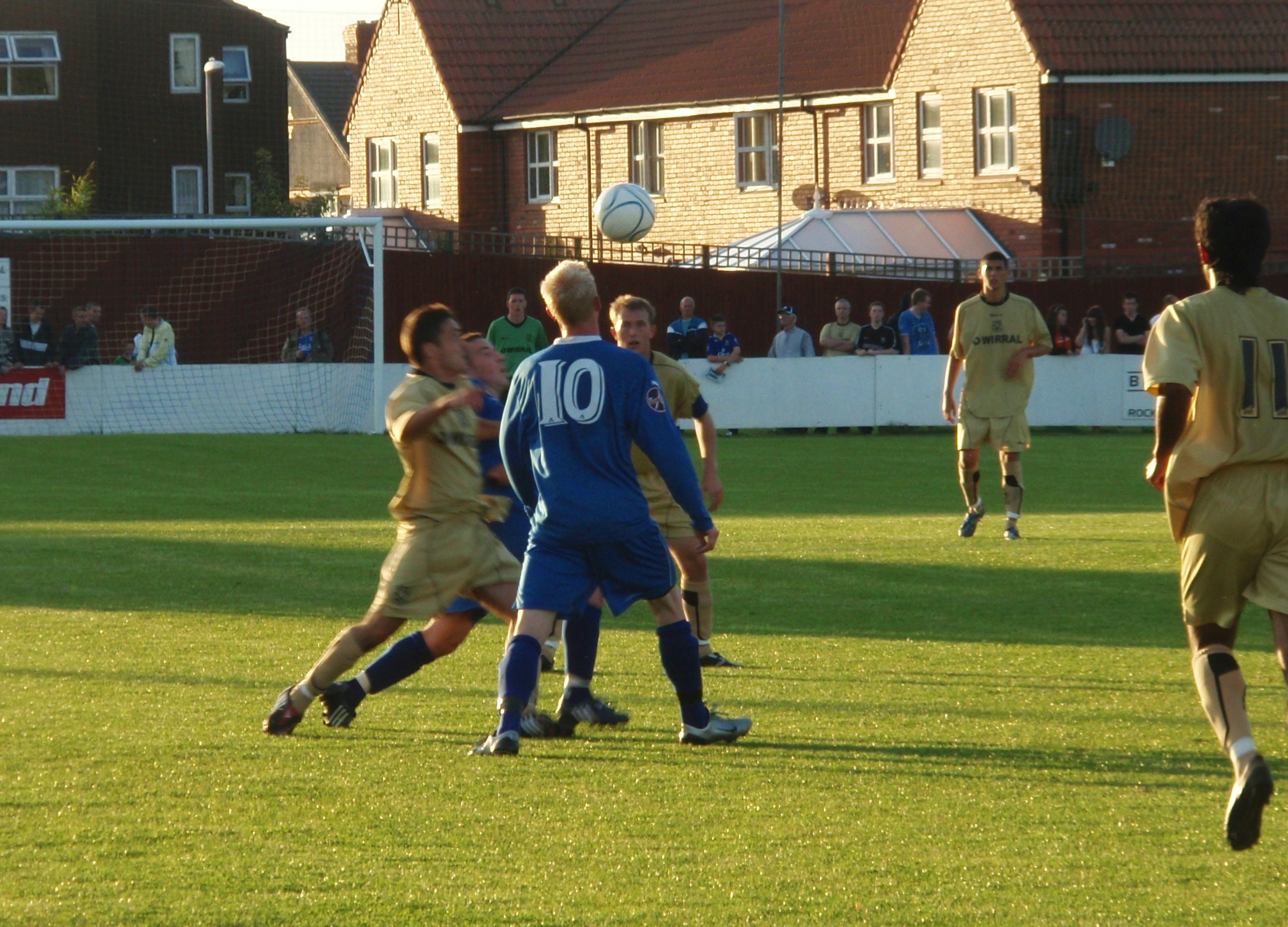
Cammell Laird play in a friendly against Tranmere Rovers in 2008

Cammell Laird 1907 Football Club is a semi-professional football club based in Birkenhead, Merseyside, England. The club are currently members of the North West Counties League Division One South and play at Kirklands.

== History ==
The club was established in 1907 as Cammell Laird Institute Association Football Club, playing their first match against Tranmere Rovers on 2 September that year. They joined Division One the West Cheshire League for the 1907–08 season, finishing tenth. Despite finishing bottom of Division One in 1909–10 they were not relegated to Division Two.

After World War I the Cammell Laird company faced cutbacks due to reduced government spending on ships, and the football team was taken back in-house, with a company league set up and a representative team put forward to play in Wirral Football Association cup competitions. In 1922 a team was entered to Division Two of the Birkenhead & Wirral League under the name Kirklands Football Club, and in 1924–25 they were league champions. The club was disbanded in 1939 due to the outbreak of World War II, but reformed in 1946 under the name Cammell Laird Association Football Club.

The club rejoined the Birkenhead & Wirral League, before moving up to the West Cheshire League in 1948. After finishing fourth in 1950–51, the club were promoted to Division One. However, they were relegated back to Division Two after finishing second-from-bottom of Division One the following season. They won Division Two in 1957–58, but were not promoted. However, after winning it again the following season, they moved up to Division One. In 1968–69 the club won Division One without losing a match. They were league champions again in 1970–71 and went on to win five successive titles between 1974–75 and 1978–79. After finishing as runners-up in 1979–80, they won four successive titles between 1980–81 and 1983–84. They were champions again in 1986–87, before winning another four consecutive titles between 1988–89 and 1991–92. Further titles followed in 1993–94, 1998–99 and 2000–01.

After finishing as runners-up in 2003–04, Cammell Laird moved up to Division Two of the North West Counties League. They won the division at the first attempt, earning promotion to the Premier Division. They won the Premier Division the following season and were promoted to Division One of the Northern Premier League; the season also saw them reach the semi-finals of the FA Vase, eventually losing 5–0 on aggregate to Nantwich Town in the semi-finals. Their first season in the Northern Premier League saw them finish as Division One runners-up, qualifying for the promotion play-offs. However, after beating Colwyn Bay 3–2 in the semi-finals, they lost 2–1 to Eastwood Town in the final.

League reorganisation saw them placed in Division One South for the 2007–08 season, in which they finished as runners-up again, this time earning promotion without the need for play-offs as champions Retford United were denied promotion due to ground grading. However, despite finishing eighteenth in the Premier Division in 2008–09, the club were relegated after themselves failing to meet the ground grading criteria. The club returned to Division One South, but were moved to Division One North in 2010. Despite finishing bottom of the division in 2011–12, they avoided being relegated. The following season saw them finish second, again qualifying for the promotion play-offs. After beating Mossley 1–0 in the semi-finals, they lost 4–2 on penalties to Trafford in the final after a 0–0 draw.

After finishing eleventh in 2013–14, the club were disbanded and replaced by a new club, Cammell Laird 1907, which joined Division One of the North West Counties League. They finished as runners-up in their first season, earning promotion to the Premier Division. However, in 2016–17 the club finished bottom of the Premier Division, resulting in relegation back to Division One. A sixth-placed finish in 2017–18 saw the club qualify for the promotion play-offs. After beating Prestwich Heys 4–1 in the semi-finals, they were beaten 2–1 in the final by Whitchurch Alport.

=== Season-by-season record ===
| Season | Division | Pld | W | D | L | GF | GA | GD | Pts | Position | Notes | Av. attendance |
|---|---|---|---|---|---|---|---|---|---|---|---|---|
| 2004–05 | North West Counties League Division Two | 36 | 27 | 6 | 3 | 142 | 34 | +108 | 87 | 1/19 | Promoted | 83 |
| 2005–06 | North West Counties League Division One | 42 | 35 | 3 | 4 | 126 | 36 | +90 | 102 | 1/22 | Promoted | 114 |
| 2006–07 | Northern Premier League Division One | 46 | 28 | 10 | 8 | 105 | 56 | +49 | 94 | 2/24 | Lost in play-offs | 171 |
| 2007–08 | Northern Premier League Division One South | 42 | 27 | 5 | 10 | 82 | 54 | +28 | 86 | 2/18 | Promoted | 148 |
| 2008–09 | Northern Premier League Premier Division | 42 | 12 | 11 | 19 | 58 | 70 | −12 | 47 | 18/22 | Relegated | 161 |
| 2009–10 | Northern Premier League Division One South | 42 | 13 | 11 | 18 | 49 | 64 | −15 | 50 | 16/22 | Transferred | 93 |
| 2010–11 | Northern Premier League Division One North | 44 | 13 | 8 | 23 | 66 | 94 | −28 | 47 | 19/23 | | 126 |
| 2011–12 | Northern Premier League Division One North | 42 | 8 | 4 | 30 | 34 | 103 | −69 | 28 | 22/22 | | 65 |
| 2012–13 | Northern Premier League Division One North | 42 | 26 | 8 | 8 | 86 | 58 | +28 | 86 | 2/22 | Lost in play-offs | 57 |
| 2013–14 | Northern Premier League Division One North | 42 | 15 | 9 | 18 | 65 | 64 | +1 | 54 | 11/22 | Relegated | 55 |
| 2014–15 | North West Counties League Division One | 36 | 28 | 5 | 3 | 114 | 35 | +79 | 89 | 2/19 | Promoted | 54 |
| 2015–16 | North West Counties League Premier Division | 42 | 14 | 8 | 20 | 71 | 83 | −12 | 50 | 15/22 | | 66 |
| 2016–17 | North West Counties League Premier Division | 42 | 3 | 11 | 28 | 40 | 140 | −100 | 20 | 22/22 | Relegated | 61 |
| 2017–18 | North West Counties League Division One | 42 | 22 | 6 | 14 | 84 | 58 | +26 | 72 | 6/22 | Lost in play-offs | 66 |
| 2018–19 | North West Counties League Division One South | 38 | 10 | 11 | 17 | 55 | 73 | −18 | 41 | 15/20 | | 67 |
| 2019–20 | North West Counties League Division One South | 29 | 9 | 7 | 13 | 56 | 58 | −2 | 34 | – | Season abandoned due to COVID-19 pandemic | 91 |
| 2020–21 | North West Counties League Division One South | 7 | 2 | 0 | 5 | 6 | 10 | −4 | 6 | – | Season abandoned due to COVID-19 pandemic | 83 |
| 2021–22 | North West Counties League Division One South | 38 | 12 | 7 | 19 | 58 | 88 | −30 | 43 | 14/20 | | 85 |
| 2022–23 | North West Counties League Division One South | 38 | 9 | 6 | 23 | 51 | 86 | −35 | 33 | 17/20 | | 70* |
| 2023–24 | North West Counties League Division One South | 34 | 10 | 11 | 13 | 56 | 66 | −10 | 41 | 13/18 | | 105 |
| 2024–25 | North West Counties League Division One South | 33 | 13 | 5 | 15 | 58 | 59 | −10 | 41 | 11/18 | | 105 |

== Ground ==
The club initially played at the original Prenton Park, before moving to Park Road North in Birkenhead Park, where they played between 1909 and 1921, although league matches were played at the Bebington Oval after World War I. In 1922 they moved to Kirklands in Rock Ferry. It currently has a capacity of 2,000, of which 150 is seated.

== Managers ==
| Manager | Nationality | Period |
|---|---|---|
| Ian Doran | England | June 2004 – June 2008 |
| Ken McKenna | England | June 2008 – September 2008 |
| Derek Ward | England | September 2008 – November 2009 |
| Alex Hay | England | November 2009 – November 2010 |
| Tony Sullivan | England | November 2010 – October 2014 |
| Paul McNally | England | October 2014 – February 2016 |
| Tony Sullivan | England | February 2016 – May 2016 |
| Neil Prince | England | June 2016 – October 2016 |
| Michael McGraa | England | October 2016 – May 2018 |
| Phil Burton | England | June 2018 – December 2020 |
| Stuart Keir | England | May 2021 – April 2023 |
| Andy Cass | England | May 2023 – present |

== Honours ==
- North West Counties League
  - Division One champions 2005–06
  - Division Two champions 2004–05
  - Challenge Cup winners 2004–05
  - Division Two Cup winners 2004–05
- West Cheshire League
  - Division One champions 1968–69, 1970–71, 1974–75, 1975–76, 1976–77, 1977–78, 1978–79, 1980–81, 1981–82, 1982–83, 1983–84, 1986–87, 1988–89, 1989–90, 1990–91, 1991–92, 1993–94, 1998–99, 2001–02
  - Division Two champions 1957–58, 1958–59
  - Pyke Challenge Cup winners 1969–70, 1975–76, 1976–77, 1977–78, 1978–79, 1991–92, 1992–93, 1993–94, 1998–99, 2001–02, 2014–15
- Birkenhead & Wirral League
  - Division One champions 1924–25
- Cheshire Senior Cup
  - Winners 2006–07
- Cheshire Amateur Cup
  - Winners 1972–73, 1975–76, 1980–81, 1981–82, 1992–93, 1993–94, 2000–01, 2002–03
- West Cheshire Bowl
  - Winners 1957–58
- Wirral Senior Cup
  - Winners 1971–72, 1976–77, 1977–78, 1978–79, 1979–80, 1987–88, 1989–90, 1990–91, 1994–95, 1999–2000, 2001–02, 2021–22
- Shipley Cup
  - Winners 1920–21
- Wirrall Minor 'B' Cup
  - Winners 1923–24
- Regent Cup
  - Winners 1926–27

== Records ==
- Best FA Cup performance: Third qualifying round, 2004–05, 2005–06
- Best FA Trophy performance: Third qualifying round, 2006–07, 2008–09, 2012–13
- Best FA Vase performance: Semi-finals, 2005–06
- Highest home attendance: 1,700 vs Harwich & Parkeston, FA Vase fifth round, 1990–91

== See also ==
- Cammell Laird 1907 F.C. players
- Cammell Laird 1907 F.C. managers
