= Colne F.C. =

Association football club in England

Coordinates: 53°51′50.440″N 2°10′37.729″W

Colne
- Full name: Colne Football Club
- Nickname: The Reds
- Founded: January 1996
- Ground: Holt House, Colne
- Capacity: 1,800 (160 seated)
- Chairman: Ben Metcalfe
- Manager: Andy Harrison
- League: North West Counties League Division One North
- 2025–26: North West Counties League Division One North, 15th of 18
Home colours	Away colours

Colne Football Club is a football club based in Colne, Lancashire, England. Affiliated with the Lancashire County Football Association, they are currently members of the North West Counties League Division One North and play at Holt House.

== History ==
The club was established in January 1996, six years after Colne Dynamoes folded after being refused promotion to the Football Conference. They joined Division Two of the North West Counties League, with their first league match being a 1–0 defeat by Middlewich Athletic. They went on to finish bottom of the division in their first season. The club finished in the bottom half of the table every season until 2003–04, when they won the division, earning promotion to Division One; the season also saw them win the Division Two Cup with a 1–0 win against Great Harwood Town in the final, as well as reaching the semi-finals of the FA Vase, eventually losing 4–3 on aggregate to AFC Sudbury.

Division One was renamed the Premier Division in 2008. In 2015–16 Colne were Premier Division champions, earning promotion to Division One North of the Northern Premier League. They finished fifth in the division in 2016–17, qualifying the promotion playoffs. However, they lost 4–0 to Farsley Celtic in the semi-finals. As a result of league reorganisation, the club were placed in Division One West for the 2018–19 season. They went on to finish fourth in the division and qualified for the play-offs, losing 2–1 to Leek Town in the semi-finals. In 2022–23 the club finished second-from-bottom of Division One West and were relegated back to the Premier Division of the North West Counties League.

In 2023–24 Colne won the Lancashire FA Trophy, defeating Bamber Bridge 5–2 in the final. The following season saw them finish bottom of the Premier Division of the North West Counties League, resulting in relegation to Division One North.

== Ground ==
The club play at Holt House, which was previously the home ground of Colne Dynamoes. The ground was originally an area with several pitches, before being enclosed in 1975 when Dynamoes joined the Lancashire Combination, although it continued to be used for cricket. Between 1982 and 1985 three stands were erected and floodlights installed. Another new stand was built in 1986. When Dynamoes folded, the ground was used by the Colne Royal British Legion football club until they folded in 1995, after which the modern Colne club became tenants when they formed the following year. The ground has a capacity of 1,800, of which 160 is seated and 1,000 covered.

== Honours ==
- North West Counties League
  - Premier Division champions 2015–16
  - Division Two champions 2003–04
  - Division Two Cup winners 2003–04
- Lancashire FA Trophy
  - Winners 2023–24

== Records ==
- Best FA Cup performance: Fourth qualifying round, 2019–20
- Best FA Trophy performance: Second round, 2022–23
- Best FA Vase performance: Semi-finals, 2003–04
- Record attendance: 1,742 v A.F.C. Sudbury, FA Vase semi-final, 20 March 2004
- Most appearances: Richard Walton
- Most goals: Geoff Payton

== See also ==
- Colne F.C. players
- Colne F.C. managers
