= Stockport Sports F.C. =

Association football club in England

Stockport Sports
- Full name: Stockport Sports Football Club
- Nicknames: The Saxons, The Steelmen
- Founded: 1970 (as Woodley Athletic)
- Dissolved: 2015
- Ground: The Neil Rourke Memorial Stadium, Woodley, Stockport
- Capacity: 2,384 (192 seats)
- 2014–15: North West Counties Football League; Premier Division, failed to complete season
Home colours	Away colours

Stockport Sports F.C. was a football club based in Woodley, Stockport, Greater Manchester, England. They were established in 1970 as Woodley Athletic, and played at the Neil Rourke Memorial Stadium. The club's name was changed to Woodley Sports in 1980 during its time in the Lancashire and Cheshire Amateur League.

In 1992, they became champions of the Manchester League Division One, and were promoted to the Manchester League Premier Division the following year. They became a member of the Northern Premier League Division One in 2004; in 2007, they played in the inaugural season of the Northern Premier League Division One North. The Lambeth Grove Stadium (at which they played) is one of the few football grounds in England to have a synthetic playing surface; because of this, their ties in the FA Cup were switched if they were drawn at home.

In the 2011–12 season they were demoted to the North West Counties Football League Premier Division for ground grading reasons and changed their name to Stockport Sports.

On 2 March 2015, the club was expelled from the NWCFL for a breach of numerous league rules.

== History ==
Woodley Sports won the Manchester Football League Division One title in 1992. The following year saw Woodley both win the Gilchrist Cup and take the Premier Division Runners-up spot. Work to enclose the ground began in 1996–97, and Woodley's application to join the North West Counties League was accepted. By this time, the management team of John Imrie and Gary Lowe had been introduced. Both had played at the highest levels for professional and semi-professional clubs such as Manchester City, Crystal Palace, Macclesfield and Runcorn.

During the 1997–98 season Woodley set a North West Counties League record, when Peter Carty scored seven goals in a league game against Blackpool Mechanics. Carty was also Woodley's leading scorer that season, netting 35 goals. Woodley also scored a record 102 league goals that season. During the summer of 1998 Woodley began work on its biggest project to date, the installation of floodlights. The lighted pitch gave the club a boost, enabling it to enter the FA Vase, Cheshire Senior Cup, North Western Trans Floodlit Cup and the FA Cup.

The 1999–2000 season saw the club's first ever FA Cup Match against reigning NCEL champions Ossett Albion, which resulted in a 2–1 victory for the Steelmen. The continued work of the club was rewarded that season when the Steelmen won the Second Division championship on goal difference from Curzon, winning 12 of their last 13 matches and drawing the other, to take its place in the top flight of the North West Counties League.

Woodley Sports logo

The 2000–01 and 2001–02 seasons saw the club consolidate itself in the top half of the NWCFL First Division, with its reserve team winning a double championship in 2002; it won the Reserve Division title for the second consecutive year and the Reserve Cup. The season finished with work beginning on a new 200-seat stand, which was due to be finished for the 2002–2003 season. The 2003–2004 was Woodley's greatest to date. It won the Cheshire FA Senior Cup, beating Witton Albion in the final; unfortunately, that game was better-known for its "streaker incident", when the opposition captain was sent off for tackling the streaker, than for its being the first time a North West Counties side reached the finals. The FA restructuring of the football pyramid allowed Woodley to gain promotion to the Northern Premier League by finishing fourth in the league. With the Lambeth Grove stadium passed for the Northern Premier League, the Club declared itself a limited company effective 1 August 2004.

The 2004–05 season saw Woodley Sports compete in the NPL Division One; it finished 11th and reached the final of the Chairman's Cup. Off the pitch the club obtained the support of two local businessmen, who have worked with the club on £3.5 million worth of development on the site. Phase one was the installation of a synthetic surface in July 2005, which ensured no future postponements and provided an income stream for the club from hiring of the facilities. Future plans included new floodlights, additional seating, covered standing accommodations, new perimeter fencing and new treatment rooms for use by players and spectators.

The 2005–06 season saw Woodley finish in their highest NPL position (finishing fourth, gaining an automatic playoff place), only to lose against Gresley Rovers. During that season, they sold striker Liam Dickinson to Stockport County for £2,000. A youth team was introduced; the previous squad moved up to become the reserve team, competing in the Lancashire Lancit League.

2006–07 was disappointing by contrast with a 10th-place finish; however, the season was notable for cup successes in major competitions at Conference North, Leigh RMI in the FA Cup and Moor Green in the FA Trophy. Home successes were gained against Marine and Whitby Town. However, they were defeated 8–7 on a penalty kick in overtime in the League President's Cup semi-final at Premier League side Matlock, despite playing over an hour with 10 men.

During the 2008–09 season, the team finished 13th in the Northern Premier League Division One North. Disappointing news was given to Woodley Sports when the administration of Stockport County was announced. Woodley were owed £150,000 from Stockport County for the sale of Liam Dickinson, and this shortfall put the club's future in doubt. However 18-year-old Anthony Sarcevic was sold to Crewe Alexandra for an undisclosed fee. He came through the ranks of Woodley Sports and manager Trevor MacFarlane gave him the chance of first team football in September.

In April 2012 the club announced the appointment of former England international player Peter Withe as manager.

In November 2012 Withe tendered his resignation to the board and now continues with various media roles outside of the club.

For the 2012–13 season the club changed its name to Stockport Sports.

The 2014–15 season saw the club breach a series of league rules throughout the campaign, such as failing to fulfill fixtures on three occasions and their failure to notify the league of their home venue for the remainder of their home games. This led to a suspension being placed on the club by the Cheshire FA. In March 2015, the member clubs of the NWCFL voted in favour of expelling the club from the league.

== Honours ==
=== Cup ===
- Northern Premier League Chairman's Cup
  - Finalists: 2004–05
- Cheshire FA Senior Cup
  - Winners: 2003–04
- Cheshire FA Youth Cup
  - Winners: 2004–05
- Gilchrist Cup
  - Winners: 1992–93
- Rhodes Cup
  - Winners: 1977, 1978
  - Finalists: 1986
- S.E. Woolam Aggregate Trophy
  - Winners: 1980
- Wray Cup
  - Winners: 1998, 1990
- Whitehead Cup
  - Winners: 1980
- Stockport and District Football Association Senior Cup
  - Winners: 1975, 2007
  - Finalists: 1997

=== League ===
- Lancashire and Cheshire Amateur Football League
  - Division 3 (C) Champions: 1975
  - Division 2 (B) Champions: 1976
  - Division 1 Runner-up: 1979
  - Division A Champions: 1980
- Manchester Football League Premier Division
  - Runner-up: 1992–93
- North West Counties League Division Two
  - Champions: 1999–2000
- North West Counties League Reserve Divisions
  - Runner-up: 1999–2000
  - Champions 2000–01, 2001–02
