= Stone Dominoes F.C. =

Association football club in England

Coordinates: 52°53′28.61″N 2°11′35.12″W

- Full name: Stone Dominoes Football Club
- Nickname(s): The Doms
- Founded: 1987
- Ground: Wellbeing Park, Stone
- 2023–24: Staffordshire County Senior League Division Two South, 5th of 11
Home colours	Away colours

Stone Dominoes Football Club is a football club based in Stone, Staffordshire. They played at Wellbeing Park.

== History ==
The club was established in 1987 and joined the Midland League Division Two in 1995. They reached the 5th round of the FA Vase in 2003–04 season. They joined the North West Counties League in 2000, but resigned at the end of the 2012–13 season. Their home ground was Wellbeing Park (Formerly Springbank Stadium).

In 2008 they signed comedy actor Ralf Little as one of their players.

The club had 22 teams with players (boys and girls) from age 4 to adult representing the club.

The men's senior team returned to competition in 2015, competing in the Staffordshire County Senior League, First Division, 2015–16 season.

Stone Dominoes Ladies won the Staffordshire County Women's League in 2014–15 season and now play in the West Midland Regional Division One North.

== Records ==
- FA Cup best performance: second qualifying round – 2004–05
- FA Vase best performance: fifth round replay – 2003–04

== Honours ==
- NWCFL Division One Champions 2009–10
- NWCFL Div 2 Trophy Winners 2002–03
- Midland League Winners 1999–2000
- Midland League Charity Shield Winners 1999–2000
- Midland League Cup Winners 1998–99
- Midland League Div 2 Cup Winners 1996–97
- Staffordshire FA Vase winners 2009–10...
