= 1998–99 North West Counties Football League =

The 1998–99 North West Counties Football League season (known as the North Western Trains Football League for sponsorship reasons) was the 17th in the history of the North West Counties Football League, a football competition in England.

The league comprised two divisions, Division One and Division Two (at levels 8 and 9 respectively of the English football league system), and there were additionally three cup competitions: the League Challenge Cup knockout competition (known as the North Western Trains League Cup for sponsorship reasons), open to all the league's clubs; the Second Division Trophy, a knockout trophy competition for Division Two clubs only; and the Floodlit Trophy competition for all the league's clubs with floodlights. The league also had a reserves team section.

== Division One ==
North West Counties Football League Division One
- Season: 1998–99
- Teams: 21
- Champions: Workington
- Promoted: Workington
- Relegated: Holker Old Boys
- Matches: 420
- Goals: 1,350 (3.21 per match)

Owing to the late withdrawal of Blackpool Rovers in July Division One featured only 21 clubs, 16 remaining from the previous season plus 5 additions (4 of whom had been promoted from Division Two as Division One was intended to be rebuilt back to 22 clubs):

- Bootle, promoted as seventh place in Division Two
- Cheadle Town, promoted as fourth place in Division Two
- Leek CSOB, promoted as third place in Division Two
- Skelmersdale United, promoted as runners-up of Division Two
- Workington, relegated from the Northern Premier League Division One

At the end of the season the champions Workington who had been relegated the previous season bounced back to the Northern Premier League Division One; in their final home match of the season, a championship decider versus Mossley, a new league single match attendance record of 2,281 was established (exceeding the then record of 1,353 set sixteen seasons previously at the Division Two Radcliffe Borough versus Caernarfon Town match from the 1982–83 season). The bottom club Holker Old Boys were relegated to Division Two – the only club relegated from the division.

=== League table ===
Pos	Team	Pld	W	D	L	GF	GA	GD	Pts	Season End Notes
1	Workington (C, P)	40	27	9	4	86	28	+58	90	Promoted to Northern Premier; League Division One
2	Mossley	40	27	7	6	91	38	+53	88	
3	Vauxhall GM	40	26	7	7	92	40	+52	85	
4	Newcastle Town	40	25	9	6	86	33	+53	84	
5	Kidsgrove Athletic	40	24	7	9	90	47	+43	79	
6	Prescot Cables	40	21	9	10	78	44	+34	72	
7	Skelmersdale United	40	21	8	11	82	50	+32	71	
8	St Helens Town	40	22	5	13	77	58	+19	71	
9	Leek County School Old Boys	40	14	11	15	52	58	−6	53	
10	Salford City	40	15	7	18	63	73	−10	52	
11	Ramsbottom United	40	14	8	18	54	64	−10	50	
12	Clitheroe	40	14	6	20	68	58	+10	48	
13	Maine Road	40	14	6	20	50	71	−21	48	
14	Rossendale United	40	14	5	21	59	81	−22	47	
15	Nantwich Town	40	12	6	22	56	68	−12	42	
16	Glossop North End	40	12	6	22	53	81	−28	42	
17	Cheadle Town	40	12	6	22	56	97	−41	42	
18	Atherton Laburnum Rovers	40	10	9	21	45	73	−28	39	
19	Atherton Collieries	40	9	7	24	50	88	−38	34	
20	Bootle	40	9	7	24	41	84	−43	34	
21	Holker Old Boys (R)	40	4	3	33	21	116	−95	15	Relegated to Division Two

Source: NWCFL: Final Tables, Season 1998/99
Rules for classification: 1) points; 2) goal difference; 3) number of goals scored.
(C) Champions; (P) Promoted; (R) Relegated

== Division Two ==
North West Counties Football League Division Two
- Season: 1998–99
- Teams: 19
- Champions: Fleetwood Freeport
- Promoted: Abbey Hey; Fleetwood Freeport
- Relegated: None
- Matches: 342
- Goals: 1,105 (3.23 per match)

Division Two featured 19 clubs, 14 remaining from the previous season plus 5 additions:

- Abbey Hey, joined from the Manchester League
- Chadderton, relegated from Division One
- Curzon Ashton, transferred from the Northern Counties East Football League
- Darwen, relegated from Division One
- Warrington Town, relegated from Division One

At the end of the season champions (and League and Cup double winners) Fleetwood Freeport and runners-up and league newcomers Abbey Hey were promoted to Division One. Also leaving the division were league founder members Maghull who, unable to finance ground improvements required by the league, resigned to the West Cheshire League.

=== League table ===
Pos	Team	Pld	W	D	L	GF	GA	GD	Pts	Season End Notes
1	Fleetwood Freeport (C, P)	36	21	8	7	102	34	+68	71	Promoted to Division One
2	Abbey Hey (P)	36	20	6	10	70	35	+35	66	Promoted to Division One
3	Squires Gate	36	17	14	5	53	31	+22	65	
4	Warrington Town	36	18	9	9	82	46	+36	63	
5	Woodley Sports	36	17	10	9	60	38	+22	61	
6	Castleton Gabriels	36	17	10	9	72	57	+15	61	
7	Formby	36	17	7	12	81	59	+22	58	
8	Darwen	36	13	12	11	64	53	+11	51	
9	Chadderton	36	11	17	8	42	38	+4	50	
10	Tetley Walker	36	14	8	14	62	64	−2	50	
11	Bacup Borough	36	11	14	11	47	61	−14	47	
12	Daisy Hill	36	12	9	15	51	62	−11	45	
13	Nelson	36	11	11	14	51	49	+2	44	
14	Curzon Ashton	36	12	7	17	56	58	−2	43	
15	Maghull	36	11	10	15	50	70	−20	43	Resigned to the West Cheshire League
16	Colne	36	11	7	18	54	71	−17	40	
17	Ashton Town	36	11	6	19	35	59	−24	39	
18	Oldham Town	36	5	7	24	34	99	−65	22	
19	Blackpool Mechanics	36	4	6	26	39	121	−82	18	

Source: NWCFL: Final Tables, Season 1998/99
Rules for classification: 1) points; 2) goal difference; 3) number of goals scored.
(C) Champions; (P) Promoted

== League Challenge Cup ==
The 1998–99 League Challenge Cup (known as the North Western Trains League Cup for sponsorship reasons) was a knockout competition open to all the league's clubs. The all Division One club final, played at Skelmersdale United F.C., was won 1–0 in a replay by Vauxhall GM who defeated Prescot Cables. The original tie held at Bury F.C. was abandoned owing to floodlight failure prior to deciding penalties being taken with the score 1–1 after extra time (1–1 at 90 minutes). Vauxhall GM were the third club to win the trophy twice (emulating Warrington Town and Burscough).

Semi-finals and Final

The semi-finals were decided on aggregate score from two legs played

Semi-finals
Prescot Cables (D1)	2	0	2
Newcastle Town (D1)	0	0	0
St Helens Town (D1)	1	2 (Note: After extra time, score at 90 minutes: 2–1)	1p (Note: Penalties)
Vauxhall GM (D1)	2	1	3p

Final
Prescot Cables (D1)	1 (Note: Played at Bury F.C. Abandoned after extra time, score at 90 minutes: 1–1)	0 (Note: Played at Skelmersdale United F.C.)
Vauxhall GM (D1)	1	1

Club's division appended to team name: (D1)=Division One
sources:

- Semi-finals: Andy Hunter (8 March 1999). "Vauxhall motor to final after penalty drama". Liverpool Echo. Liverpool. p. 46.; "Semi-Pro Statistics: NWT Lge Cup semi 2nd leg". Manchester Evening News; Super Sport. Manchester. 15 March 1999. p. 10.
- Final: "Blundell cup hero". Liverpool Daily Post. Liverpool. 17 May 1999. p. 23.; Hyder Jawad (30 April 1999). "Final halted by lights failure". Liverpool Echo. Liverpool. p. 74.

== Second Division Trophy ==
The 1998–99 Second Division Trophy was a knockout competition for Division Two clubs only. The winners, as part of a League and Cup double, were Fleetwood Freeport who defeated Warrington Town 2–1 in the final played at Darwen F.C.

Semi-finals and Final

The semi-finals were decided on aggregate score from two legs played

Semi-finals
Abbey Hey	2	0	2
Fleetwood Freeport	1	2	3
Warrington Town	3	4	7
Curzon Ashton	2	3	5

Final (Note: Played at Darwen F.C.)
Fleetwood Freeport	2
Warrington Town	1

sources:

- Semi-finals: "Semi-Pro Statistics: NWT Div 2 Trophy semi 2nd leg". Manchester Evening News; Super Sport. Manchester. 15 March 1999. p. 10.; "Semi-Pro Statistics: NWT Div 2 Trophy Semi Final 2nd leg". Manchester Evening News; Super Sport. Manchester. 22 March 1999. p. 4.
- Final: Peter Jose (15 April 1999). "Fleetwood Go for Double: 2nd Division Cup Final Fleetwood Freeport 2 Warrington Town 1". Fleetwood Weekly News. Fleetwood. p. 27.

== Floodlit Trophy ==
The 1998–99 Floodlit Trophy was a competition open to all the league's clubs with floodlights. In the all Division One club final Clitheroe defeated Kidsgrove Athletic 2–1 in the match played at Maine Road F.C.

== Reserves Section ==
Main honours for the 1998–99 season:

- Reserves Division (regionalised competition)
  - North Division
    - Winners: Ramsbottom United Reserves
    - Runners-up: Clitheroe Reserves
  - South Division
    - Winners: Glossop North End Reserves
    - Runners-up: Ashton Town Reserves
- Reserves Division Cup
  - Winners: Clitheroe Reserves
  - Runners-up: Maine Road Reserves
