= 1999–2000 North West Counties Football League =

The 1999–2000 North West Counties Football League season (known as the First North Western Trains Football League for sponsorship reasons), was the 18th in the history of the North West Counties Football League a football competition in England.

The league comprised two divisions, Division One and Division Two (at levels 8 and 9 respectively of the English football league system), and there were additionally three cup competitions: the League Challenge Cup knockout competition (known as the First North Western Trains League Cup for sponsorship reasons), open to all the league's clubs; the Second Division Trophy, a knockout trophy competition for Division Two clubs only; and a Floodlit Trophy competition for all the league's clubs with floodlights. The league also had a reserves team section.

== Division One ==
North West Counties Football League Division One
- Season: 1999–2000
- Teams: 22
- Champions: Vauxhall Motors
- Promoted: Vauxhall Motors
- Relegated: Atherton Laburnum Rovers; Bootle
- Matches: 462
- Goals: 1,461 (3.16 per match)

Division One featured 22 clubs, 19 remaining from the previous season plus 3 additions:

- Abbey Hey, promoted as runners-up of Division Two
- Great Harwood Town, relegated from the Northern Premier League Division One
- Fleetwood Freeport, promoted as champions of Division Two

At the end of the season the champions Vauxhall Motors (who had changed their name prior to the season from Vauxhall GM) were promoted to the Northern Premier League Division One and the bottom two clubs, Bootle and Atherton Laburnum Rovers were relegated to Division Two.

=== League table ===
Pos	Team	Pld	W	D	L	GF	GA	GD	Pts	Season End Notes
1	Vauxhall Motors (C, P)	42	29	7	6	101	32	+69	94	Promoted to Northern Premier; League Division One
2	Newcastle Town	42	26	7	9	82	35	+47	85	
3	Ramsbottom United	42	23	10	9	87	53	+34	79	
4	Mossley	42	23	10	9	80	50	+30	79	
5	Rossendale United	42	23	9	10	77	46	+31	78	
6	Skelmersdale United	42	22	9	11	91	53	+38	75	
7	Fleetwood Freeport	42	21	10	11	75	45	+30	73	
8	Prescot Cables	42	21	10	11	83	55	+28	73	
9	St Helens Town	42	20	13	9	81	59	+22	73	
10	Clitheroe	42	21	7	14	75	49	+26	70	
11	Salford City	42	17	7	18	70	69	+1	58	
12	Atherton Collieries	42	16	6	20	58	68	−10	54	
13	Kidsgrove Athletic	42	14	9	19	47	66	−19	51	
14	Abbey Hey	42	14	8	20	50	75	−25	50	
15	Nantwich Town	42	13	9	20	60	73	−13	48	
16	Great Harwood Town	42	12	9	21	55	81	−26	45	
17	Glossop North End	42	10	11	21	52	73	−21	41	
18	Cheadle Town	42	8	13	21	49	85	−36	37	
19	Maine Road	42	9	10	23	59	100	−41	37	
20	Leek County School Old Boys	42	8	10	24	49	101	−52	34	
21	Bootle (R)	42	6	8	28	29	90	−61	26	Relegated to Division Two
22	Atherton Laburnum Rovers (R)	42	4	12	26	51	103	−52	24	Relegated to Division Two

Source: NWCFL: Final Tables, Season 1999/00
Rules for classification: 1) points; 2) goal difference; 3) number of goals scored.
(C) Champions; (P) Promoted; (R) Relegated

== Division Two ==
North West Counties Football League Division Two
- Season: 1999–2000
- Teams: 18
- Champions: Woodley Sports
- Promoted: Curzon Ashton; Woodley Sports
- Relegated: None
- Matches: 306
- Goals: 1,054 (3.44 per match)

Division Two featured 18 clubs, 16 remaining from the previous season plus 2 additions:

- Alsager, promoted as runners-up of the Midland Football League
- Holker Old Boys, relegated from Division One

At the end of the season champions Woodley Sports and runners-up Curzon Ashton were promoted to Division One. All the other 16 clubs remained in the division.

=== League table ===
Pos	Team	Pld	W	D	L	GF	GA	GD	Pts	Season End Notes
1	Woodley Sports (C, P)	34	24	6	4	85	29	+56	78	Promotied to Division One
2	Curzon Ashton (P)	34	24	6	4	78	26	+52	78	Promotied to Division One
3	Nelson	34	21	8	5	77	31	+46	71	
4	Darwen	34	20	6	8	69	35	+34	66	
5	Bacup Borough	34	15	11	8	68	42	+26	56	
6	Squires Gate	34	16	7	11	70	49	+21	55	
7	Tetley Walker	34	16	4	14	56	70	−14	52	
8	Castleton Gabriels	34	15	6	13	67	67	0	51	
9	Warrington Town	34	14	8	12	66	44	+22	50	
10	Chadderton	34	12	12	10	52	57	−5	48	
11	Formby	34	12	8	14	52	68	−16	44	
12	Alsager	34	11	8	15	48	64	−16	41	
13	Colne	34	12	2	20	44	70	−26	38	
14	Holker Old Boys	34	8	11	15	59	73	−14	35	
15	Blackpool Mechanics	34	9	6	19	49	74	−25	33	
16	Daisy Hill	34	7	5	22	41	75	−34	26	
17	Oldham Town	34	4	6	24	43	86	−43	18	
18	Ashton Town	34	5	2	27	30	94	−64	17	

Source: NWCFL: Final Tables, Season 1999/00
Rules for classification: 1) points; 2) goal difference; 3) number of goals scored.
(C) Champions; (P) Promoted

== League Challenge Cup ==
The 1999–2000 League Challenge Cup (known as the First North Western Trains League Cup for sponsorship reasons) was a knockout competition open to all the league's clubs. The all Division One club final, played at Bury F.C., was won by Skelmersdale United 6–5 on penalties following a 0–0 draw (after extra time) against Newcastle Town.

Semi-finals and Final

The semi-finals were decided on aggregate score from two legs played

Semi-finals
Newcastle Town (D1)	0	1 (Note: After extra time)	1 (Note: Newcastle won on the away goal rule)
Prescot Cables (D1)	0	1	1
Fleetwood Freeport (D1)	1	0	1
Skelmersdale United (D1)	0	5	5

Final (Note: Played at Bury F.C.)
Newcastle Town (D1)	0 (Note: After extra time)	5p (Note: Penalties)
Skelmersdale United (D1)	0	6p

Club's division appended to team name: (D1)=Division One
sources:

- Semi-finals: "First North Western Trains League: League Cup Semi-final Second Leg". The Gazette. Blackpool. 10 April 2000. p. 32.
- Final: "Skem spot on for cup glory thanks to hero Holcroft". Skelmersdale Advertiser. Ormskirk. 24 May 2000. p. 85.

== Second Division Trophy ==
The 1999–2000 Second Division Trophy was a knockout competition for Division Two clubs only. The winners, in the final played at Prescot Cables F.C., were the previous season's losing finalist Warrington Town who defeated Tetley Walker 2–0.

Semi-finals and Final

The semi-finals were decided on aggregate score from two legs played

Semi-finals
Alsager	2	0	2
Tetley Walker	4	2	6
Warrington Town	2	1	3
Nelson	0	2	2

Final (Note: Played at Prescot Cables F.C.)
Tetley Walker	0
Warrington Town	2

sources:

- Semi-finals: "Promotion is the key after semi-final exit". Nelson Leader. Blackpool. 11 February 2000. p. 20.; "Tetley ease into all-Warrington final with home leg triumph". Warrington Guardian. 24 February 2000.
- Final: "Now You See It Now You Don't As Town Beat Tetley". Warrington Guardian. 14 April 2000.

== Floodlit Trophy ==
The 1999–2000 Floodlit Trophy was a competition open to all the league's clubs with floodlights. In the all Division One club final the league champions Vauxhall Motors defeated Rossendale United.

== Reserves Section ==
Main honours for the 1999–2000 season:

- Reserves Division (regionalised competition)
  - North Division
    - Winners: Clitheroe Reserves
    - Runners-up: Darwen Reserves
  - South Division
    - Winners: Salford City Reserves
    - Runners-up: Woodley Sports Reserves
- Reserves Division Cup
  - Winners: Cheadle Town Reserves
  - Runners-up: Clitheroe Reserves
