= 2000–01 North West Counties Football League =

The 2000–01 North West Counties Football League season was the 19th in the history of the North West Counties Football League, a football competition in England.

The league comprised two divisions, Division One and Division Two (at levels 8 and 9 respectively of the English football league system), and there were additionally three cup competitions: the League Challenge Cup knockout competition (known as the Worthington Challenge Trophy for sponsorship reasons) open to all the league's clubs; the Second Division Trophy, a knockout trophy competition for Division Two clubs only; and a Floodlit Trophy competition for all the league's clubs with floodlights which was abandoned without conclusion owing to bad weather. The league also had a reserves team section.

== Division One ==
North West Counties Football League Division One
- Season: 2000–01
- Teams: 22
- Champions: Rossendale United
- Promoted: Rossendale United
- Relegated: Cheadle Town; Leek CSOB
- Matches: 462
- Goals: 1,554 (3.36 per match)

Division One featured 22 clubs, 19 remaining from the previous season plus 3 additions:

- Curzon Ashton, promoted as runners-up of Division Two
- Flixton, relegated from the Northern Premier League Division One
- Woodley Sports, promoted as champions of Division Two

At the end of the season the champions Rossendale United were promoted to the Northern Premier League Division One and the bottom two clubs, Leek County School Old Boys and Cheadle Town, were relegated to Division Two.

=== League table ===
Pos	Team	Pld	W	D	L	GF	GA	GD	Pts	Season End Notes
1	Rossendale United (C, P)	42	29	5	8	114	44	+70	92	Promoted to Northern Premier; League Division One
2	Clitheroe	42	27	8	7	105	47	+58	89	
3	Ramsbottom United	42	28	4	10	85	44	+41	88	
4	St Helens Town	42	26	9	7	98	40	+58	87	
5	Fleetwood Freeport	42	26	4	12	90	50	+40	82	
6	Kidsgrove Athletic	42	24	10	8	81	46	+35	82	
7	Salford City	42	23	10	9	87	41	+46	79	
8	Prescot Cables	42	24	5	13	94	54	+40	77	
9	Newcastle Town	42	20	7	15	69	45	+24	67	
10	Mossley	42	19	7	16	73	56	+17	64	
11	Curzon Ashton	42	18	9	15	67	66	+1	63	
12	Skelmersdale United	42	17	8	17	69	69	0	59	
13	Woodley Sports	42	16	9	17	69	69	0	57	
14	Abbey Hey	42	15	6	21	76	92	−16	51	
15	Maine Road	42	15	3	24	75	102	−27	48	
16	Nantwich Town	42	10	9	23	46	79	−33	39	
17	Atherton Collieries	42	11	6	25	43	88	−45	39	
18	Glossop North End	42	9	4	29	41	111	−70	31	
19	Great Harwood Town	42	7	9	26	44	93	−49	30	
20	Flixton	42	5	13	24	47	100	−53	28	
21	Leek County School Old Boys (R)	42	5	12	25	39	89	−50	27	Relegated to Division Two
22	Cheadle Town (R)	42	5	9	28	42	129	−87	24	Relegated to Division Two

Source: NWCFL: Final Tables, Season 2000/01
Rules for classification: 1) points; 2) goal difference; 3) number of goals scored.
(C) Champions; (P) Promoted; (R) Relegated

== Division Two ==
North West Counties Football League Division Two
- Season: 2000–01
- Teams: 20
- Champions: Warrington Town
- Promoted: Atherton Laburnum Rovers; Warrington Town
- Relegated: None
- Matches: 380
- Goals: 1,355 (3.57 per match)

Division Two featured 20 clubs, 16 remaining from the previous season plus 4 additions:

- Atherton Laburnum Rovers, relegated from Division One
- Bootle, relegated from Division One
- Padiham, promoted as champions of the West Lancashire Football League Division One
- Stone Dominoes, promoted as champions of the Midland Football League

At the end of the season divisional runners-up Tetley Walker resigned from the league as they were evicted from the ground they used and were unable to find a replacement. The promotion places to Division One were taken by the champions Warrington Town and third placed Atherton Laburnum Rovers. All the other 17 clubs remained in the division.

=== League table ===
Pos	Team	Pld	W	D	L	GF	GA	GD	Pts	Season End Notes
1	Warrington Town (C, P)	38	24	7	7	90	31	+59	79	Promoted to Division One
2	Tetley Walker	38	24	5	9	83	41	+42	77	Resigned (club folded)
3	Atherton Laburnum Rovers (P)	38	24	3	11	88	50	+38	75	Promoted to Division One
4	Nelson	38	21	11	6	89	44	+45	74	
5	Squires Gate	38	21	7	10	75	47	+28	70	
6	Blackpool Mechanics	38	21	6	11	85	47	+38	69	
7	Alsager	38	19	8	11	48	42	+6	65	
8	Padiham	38	20	4	14	83	71	+12	64	
9	Daisy Hill	38	18	6	14	78	80	−2	60	
10	Chadderton	38	17	7	14	68	58	+10	58	
11	Darwen	38	16	7	15	72	66	+6	55	
12	Formby	38	15	8	15	65	56	+9	53	
13	Stone Dominoes	38	15	6	17	62	63	−1	51	
14	Bacup Borough	38	13	9	16	59	60	−1	48	
15	Holker Old Boys	38	14	5	19	67	79	−12	47	
16	Bootle	38	11	8	19	70	76	−6	41	
17	Castleton Gabriels	38	10	7	21	52	90	−38	37	
18	Ashton Town	38	8	3	27	46	98	−52	27	
19	Colne	38	4	4	30	37	107	−70	16	
20	Oldham Town	38	3	3	32	38	149	−111	12	

Source: NWCFL: Final Tables, Season 2000/01
Rules for classification: 1) points; 2) goal difference; 3) number of goals scored.
(C) Champions; (P) Promoted

== League Challenge Cup ==
The 2000–01 League Challenge Cup (known as the Worthington Challenge Trophy for sponsorship reasons) was a knockout competition open to all the league's clubs. The final played at Bury F.C. was won for the first occasion in fourteen seasons by a Division Two club, Formby (who had started in the preliminary round of the competition), on penalties following a 1–1 draw after extra time (score at 90 minutes: 1–1) against Curzon Ashton of Division One.

Semi-finals and Final

Semi-finals
Curzon Ashton (D1)	5
Newcastle Town (D1)	2
Formby (D2)	4
Kidsgrove Athletic (D1)	0

Final (Note: Played at Bury F.C.)
Curzon Ashton (D1)	1 (Note: After extra time, score at 90 minutes: 1–1)	p
Formby (D2)	1	p (Note: Formby won on penalties)

Club's division appended to team name: (D1)=Division One; (D2)=Division Two
sources:

- Semi-finals: "All Results 2000/01 season (Saturday 31st March 2001)". The NWCFL.
- Final: "Formby F.C – A Brief History". formbyfc.co.uk. 2001. Archived from the original on 4 November 2001.

== Second Division Trophy ==
The 2000–01 Second Division Trophy was a knockout competition for Division Two clubs only. The winners, in the final played at Skelmersdale United F.C., were Squires Gate who defeated Bacup Borough 1–0.

Semi-finals and Final

Semi-finals
Bacup Borough	3
Daisy Hill	2
Squires Gate	2
Formby	1

Final (Note: Played at Skelmersdale United F.C.)
Bacup Borough	0
Squires Gate	1

sources:

- Semi-finals: "Local Soccer: Bacup on trail of cup glory". Lancashire Telegraph. 4 April 2001.; Mike Young (11 April 2001). "Gate secure Final place". The Gazette. Blackpool. p. 37.
- Final: "Local Soccer: Bacup just miss out". Lancashire Telegraph. 11 May 2001.

== Floodlit Trophy ==
The 2000–01 Floodlit Trophy was a competition open to all the league's clubs with floodlights; it was abandoned owing to bad weather. The competition was not played in subsequent seasons.

== Reserves Section ==
Main honours for the 2000–01 season:

- Reserves Division (regionalised competition)
  - North Division
    - Winners: Salford City Reserves
    - Runners-up: Clitheroe Reserves
  - South Division
    - Winners: Woodley Sports Reserves
    - Runners-up: Glossop North End Reserves
- Reserves Division Cup
  - Winners: Salford City Reserves
  - Runners-up: Colne Reserves
