= 1997–98 North West Counties Football League =

The 1997–98 North West Counties Football League season was the 16th in the history of the North West Counties Football League, a football competition in England.

The league comprised two divisions, Division One and Division Two (at levels 8 and 9 respectively of the English football league system), and there were additionally three cup competitions: the League Challenge Cup knockout competition, open to all the league's clubs; the Second Division Trophy, a knockout trophy competition for Division Two clubs only; and the Floodlit Trophy competition for all the league's clubs with floodlights. The league also had a reserves team section.

== Division One ==
North West Counties Football League Division One
- Season: 1997–98
- Teams: 22
- Champions: Kidsgrove Athletic
- Promoted: Burscough
- Relegated: Chadderton; Darwen; Warrington Town
- Matches: 462
- Goals: 1,529 (3.31 per match)

Division One featured featured 22 clubs, 18 remaining from the previous season plus 4 additions:

- Atherton Laburnum Rovers, relegated from the Northern Premier League Division One
- Haslingden, promoted as runners-up of Division Two
- Ramsbottom United, promoted as champions of Division Two
- Warrington Town, relegated from the Northern Premier League Division One

Over the season the champions Kidsgrove Athletic broke the league record for league goals scored in a season by a single club with 127 goals scored in 42 matches (previously held since the 1993–94 season by Haslingden with 117 goals from 34 matches); however, they were not promoted as their ground failed the grading requirement of the higher league. Instead runners-up Burscough took the automatic promotion to the Northern Premier League Division One. Five more clubs also left the division: Blackpool Rovers resigned voluntarily mid-summer prior to the start of the following season to the West Lancashire League; Haslingden quit when they folded; and three clubs, Chadderton, Darwen and Warrington Town were relegated to Division Two on ground grading shortcomings. Owing to Haslingden's resignation Atherton Collieries were repreived from relegation.

=== League table ===
| Pos | Team | Pld | W | D | L | GF | GA | GD | Pts | Season End Notes |
|---|---|---|---|---|---|---|---|---|---|---|
| 1 | Kidsgrove Athletic (C) | 42 | 32 | 3 | 7 | 127 | 50 | +77 | 99 | |
| 2 | Burscough (P) | 42 | 29 | 7 | 6 | 101 | 30 | +71 | 94 | Promoted to Northern Premier; LeagueDivision One |
| 3 | Newcastle Town | 42 | 23 | 16 | 3 | 82 | 32 | +50 | 85 | |
| 4 | Vauxhall GM | 42 | 24 | 9 | 9 | 91 | 52 | +39 | 81 | |
| 5 | St Helens Town | 42 | 22 | 12 | 8 | 91 | 59 | +32 | 78 | |
| 6 | Clitheroe | 42 | 21 | 10 | 11 | 72 | 51 | +21 | 73 | |
| 7 | Prescot Cables | 42 | 19 | 11 | 12 | 72 | 57 | +15 | 68 | |
| 8 | Glossop North End | 42 | 19 | 7 | 16 | 78 | 69 | +9 | 64 | |
| 9 | Mossley | 42 | 16 | 14 | 12 | 67 | 52 | +15 | 62 | |
| 10 | Nantwich Town | 42 | 17 | 6 | 19 | 71 | 79 | −8 | 57 | |
| 11 | Maine Road | 42 | 15 | 10 | 17 | 56 | 70 | −14 | 55 | |
| 12 | Chadderton (R) | 42 | 15 | 8 | 19 | 63 | 59 | +4 | 53 | Relegated (ground grading) to Division Two |
| 13 | Rossendale United | 42 | 15 | 6 | 21 | 61 | 80 | −19 | 51 | |
| 14 | Blackpool Rovers | 42 | 13 | 9 | 20 | 67 | 84 | −17 | 48 | Resigned to the West Lancashire League |
| 15 | Atherton Laburnum Rovers | 42 | 12 | 11 | 19 | 54 | 73 | −19 | 47 | |
| 16 | Haslingden | 42 | 12 | 10 | 20 | 68 | 95 | −27 | 46 | Club folded |
| 17 | Ramsbottom United | 42 | 12 | 9 | 21 | 58 | 84 | −26 | 45 | |
| 18 | Salford City | 42 | 13 | 4 | 25 | 64 | 92 | −28 | 43 | |
| 19 | Warrington Town (R) | 42 | 10 | 10 | 22 | 56 | 72 | −16 | 40 | Relegated (ground grading) to Division Two |
| 20 | Holker Old Boys | 42 | 7 | 12 | 23 | 46 | 96 | −50 | 33 | |
| 21 | Darwen (R) | 42 | 6 | 13 | 23 | 42 | 93 | −51 | 31 | Relegated (ground grading) to Division Two |
| 22 | Atherton Collieries | 42 | 7 | 9 | 26 | 42 | 100 | −58 | 30 | Reprieved from relegation |

Source: NWCFL: Final Tables, Season 1997/98
Rules for classification: 1) points; 2) goal difference; 3) number of goals scored.
(C) Champions; (P) Promoted; (R) Relegated

== Division Two ==
North West Counties Football League Division Two
- Season: 1997–98
- Teams: 21
- Champions: Oldham Town
- Promoted: Bootle; Cheadle Town; Leek CSOB; Skelmersdale United
- Relegated: None
- Matches: 420
- Goals: 1,638 (3.9 per match)

Division Two featured featured 21 clubs, 18 remaining from the previous season plus 3 additions:

- Bootle, relegated (ground grading) from Division One
- Fleetwood Freeport, a re-formed club (renamed from Fleetwood Wanderers)
- Woodley Sports, joined from the Manchester League

At the end of the season the champions Oldham Town were refused promotion on ground grading considerations; runners-up Skelmersdale United and third placed Leek County School Old Boys were promoted to Division One as the two highest ranked candidates from the division; also promoted (to rebuild Division One) were two clubs with ground facilities acceptable for the higher division, Cheadle Town (from fourth place in the division) and Bootle (from seventh) who had improved their ground after being demoted last season. Clubs leaving owing to negative events were two recent additions, Garswood United (joined 1996) and Middlewich Athletic (joined 1995) both expelled as their grounds were judged below the required standard and who joined the Mid Cheshire League, and also leaving were Stantondale who folded.

Both the champions Oldham Town and fifth placed Woodley Sports scored 118 goals from 40 matches played and exceeded the Division Two single season total goals scored record of Haslingden (117 goals from 34 matches over the 1993–94 season); also scoring in excess of 100 goals were Skelmersdale United (111 goals) and Cheadle Town (108 goals). With regard to goals conceded, the three bottom clubs Blackpool Mechanics (165 conceded from 40 matches), Stantondale (146) and Ashton Town (137) all conceded league highs – the latter equal to and the others higher than the previous high which was set in the 1992–93 season by one of the three, Blackpool Mechanics who had conceded 137 goals in 42 matches that season; this season's Blackpool Mechanics team also extended the highest negative goal difference record established by their forerunners from 110 that season to 132 this season.

=== League table ===
| Pos | Team | Pld | W | D | L | GF | GA | GD | Pts | Season End Notes |
|---|---|---|---|---|---|---|---|---|---|---|
| 1 | Oldham Town (C) | 40 | 27 | 8 | 5 | 118 | 49 | +69 | 89 | |
| 2 | Skelmersdale United (P) | 40 | 26 | 7 | 7 | 111 | 50 | +61 | 85 | Promoted to Division One |
| 3 | Leek County School Old Boys (P) | 40 | 26 | 7 | 7 | 77 | 39 | +38 | 85 | Promoted to Division One |
| 4 | Cheadle Town (P) | 40 | 24 | 9 | 7 | 108 | 58 | +50 | 81 | Promoted to Division One |
| 5 | Woodley Sports | 40 | 22 | 7 | 11 | 118 | 56 | +62 | 73 | |
| 6 | Formby | 40 | 22 | 7 | 11 | 90 | 63 | +27 | 73 | |
| 7 | Bootle (P) | 40 | 19 | 15 | 6 | 82 | 60 | +22 | 72 | Promoted to Division One |
| 8 | Garswood United | 40 | 19 | 10 | 11 | 98 | 62 | +36 | 67 | Expelled (ground grading); |
| 9 | Tetley Walker | 40 | 19 | 9 | 12 | 98 | 62 | +36 | 66 | |
| 10 | Castleton Gabriels | 40 | 18 | 7 | 15 | 86 | 59 | +27 | 61 | |
| 11 | Maghull | 40 | 16 | 10 | 14 | 68 | 63 | +5 | 58 | |
| 12 | Fleetwood Freeport | 40 | 15 | 11 | 14 | 73 | 55 | +18 | 56 | |
| 13 | Nelson | 40 | 17 | 5 | 18 | 69 | 76 | −7 | 56 | |
| 14 | Bacup Borough | 40 | 13 | 8 | 19 | 58 | 83 | −25 | 47 | |
| 15 | Squires Gate | 40 | 11 | 9 | 20 | 72 | 88 | −16 | 42 | |
| 16 | Daisy Hill | 40 | 11 | 9 | 20 | 60 | 86 | −26 | 42 | |
| 17 | Middlewich Athletic | 40 | 11 | 8 | 21 | 48 | 90 | −42 | 41 | Expelled (ground grading); |
| 18 | Colne | 40 | 8 | 7 | 25 | 48 | 91 | −43 | 31 | |
| 19 | Ashton Town | 40 | 6 | 6 | 28 | 73 | 137 | −64 | 24 | |
| 20 | Stantondale | 40 | 4 | 4 | 32 | 50 | 146 | −96 | 16 | Club folded |
| 21 | Blackpool Mechanics | 40 | 2 | 5 | 33 | 33 | 165 | −132 | 11 | |

Source: NWCFL: Final Tables, Season 1997/98
Rules for classification: 1) points; 2) goal difference; 3) number of goals scored.
(C) Champions; (P) Promoted

== League Challenge Cup ==
The 1997–98 League Challenge Cup was a knockout competition open to all the league's clubs. The all Division One club final, played at Bury F.C., was won as part of a league and cup double by Kidsgrove Athletic who defeated Vauxhall GM 1–0.

Semi-finals and Final

The semi-finals were decided on aggregate score from two legs played

Semi-finals
Nantwich Town (D1) | 1 | 0 | 1
Kidsgrove Athletic (D1) | 2 | 6 | 8
Glossop North End (D1) | 1 | 0 | 1
Vauxhall GM (D1) | 0 | 3 | 3

Final (Note: Played at Bury F.C.)
Kidsgrove Athletic (D1) | 1
Vauxhall GM (D1) | 0

Club's division appended to team name: (D1)=Division One
sources:

- Semi-finals: "Semi-pro Results, Scorers and Tables: NWC league Cup: Semi Final 2nd Leg". Manchester Evening News; Super Sport. Manchester. 6 April 1998. p. 13.; "North West Counties: Results: Friday April 3. League Challenge Cup s/f 2nd leg". Leek Post & Times. Leek. 8 April 1998. p. 55.
- Final: "Misery in the mud". The Chronicle (Chester edition). Chester. 1 May 1988. p. 32.

== Second Division Trophy ==
The 1997–98 Second Division Trophy was a knockout competition for Division Two clubs only. The winners were Tetley Walker who defeated Squires Gate 3–0 in the final played at Skelmersdale United F.C.

Semi-finals and Final

The semi-finals were decided on aggregate score from two legs played

Semi-finals
Formby | 0 | 1 | 1
Squires Gate | 3 | 1 | 4
Garswood United | 1 | 1 (Note: After extra time, score at 90 minutes: 1–2) | 2
Tetley Walker | 0 | 3 | 3

Final (Note: Played at Skelmersdale United F.C.)
Squires Gate | 0
Tetley Walker | 3

sources:

- Semi-finals: "Tetley Walker 3 Garswood United 1". Daily Post. Liverpool. 16 March 1998. p. 24.; "Gate go through to league cup final". The Evening Gazette. Blackpool. 23 March 1998. p. 17.
- Final: Mike Young (10 April 1998). "Double leaves Gate nursing hangover". The Evening Gazette. Blackpool. p. 33.

== Floodlit Trophy ==
The 1997–98 Floodlit Trophy was a competition open to all the league's clubs with floodlights. In the all Division One club final Burscough defeated St Helens Town 2–1 after extra time (score at 90 minutes: 1–1) in the match played at Skelmersdale United F.C.

== Reserves Section ==
Main honours for the 1997–98 season:

- Reserves Division
  - Winners: Maine Road Reserves
  - Runners-up: Clitheroe Reserves
- Reserves Division Cup
  - Winners: Ramsbottom United Reserves
  - Runners-up: Maine Road Reserves
