= Hollinshead =

Hollinshead is a surname. Notable people with the surname include:

- Ariel Hollinshead (born 1929), American cancer researcher
- Cyril Hollinshead (1902–1995), English cricketer
- Emily Hollinshead (born 1995), Welsh footballer
- Shaun Hollinshead (born 1961), English footballer and manager
- Reg Hollinshead (1924–2013), Horse racing trainer

== See also ==
- Henry Blundell-Hollinshead-Blundell (1831–1906), British Army officer and politician
- Hollinshead Hall, a ruined manor house in Lancashire, England
- Raphael Holinshed (c.1525-1582), English chronicler
- Hollinshed
