= Kidsgrove Athletic F.C. =

English football club

Coordinates: 53°04′52″N 02°15′02″W

Kidsgrove Athletic
- Full name: Kidsgrove Athletic Football Club
- Nickname: The Grove
- Founded: 1952
- Ground: Hollinwood Road, Kidsgrove
- Capacity: 2,000
- Chairman: Mick Fitzjohn
- Manager: Matt Rhead
- League: Northern Premier League Division One West
- 2025–26: Northern Premier League Division One West, 16th of 22
- Website: https://www.pitchero.com/clubs/kidsgroveathleticfc
Home colours	Away colours

Kidsgrove Athletic Football Club is an English football club based in Kidsgrove, Staffordshire, England currently playing in the Northern Premier League Division One West. The team, nicknamed "The Grove", play their home games at Hollinwood Road, Clough Hall.

== History ==
Football was played in the town of Kidsgrove before the outbreak of World War II, which led to the disbandment of the team. Football was resurrected when Kidsgrove United was formed, bringing a number of players from further afield. Local young men, unhappy with this structure, formed their own club in 1952 under the name Kidsgrove Athletic. One of these young men was Frank Timmis. The club joined the amateur Burslem and Tunstall League. They played on the Vickers and Goodwin pitch next to the A50 before deciding not to play football in 1961, opting instead to develop a ground on Hollinwood Road, Clough Hall. The club won the Burslem and Tunstall League in 1962 and joined the Staffordshire County League in 1963.

They won the Division Two title in 1963–64 before winning the Division One title in 1965–66. Kidsgrove moved to the Mid-Cheshire League in 1966 a move which caused some controversy. The team thrived in the new league and were crowned champions in 1970–71, 1977–78, 1986–87 and 1987–88 and also won the Mid-Cheshire League Cup in 1968, 1970 and 1986. The club joined the North West Counties Football League in 1990 and were promoted to the Premier Division in 1991–92 due to ground grading. After several seasons of struggle at this level they won the title in 1997–98 and 2001–02 which earned them promotion to the Northern Premier League. Kidsgrove struggled with the step up to the eighth tier narrowly avoiding relegation in 2002–03 and 2003–04. Under the management of Ant Buckle and Darren Twigg they finished in mid-table in 2004–05 and 2005–06. Peter Ward re-joined the club in the summer of 2006 which saw Kidsgrove begin to mount a promotion challenge and they reached the play-offs in 2009–10 but lost out to Glapwell. In 2010–11 Grove missed out on a play-off spot by four points finishing in 7th position.

In 2011–12 Kidsgrove reached the fourth-qualifying round of the FA Cup where they lost 2–0 to Bradford Park Avenue. In the summer of 2012 Peter Ward left the club and was replaced by Shaun Hollinshead however he was sacked in April 2013. Ant Buckle and Darren Twigg took control of the side for the 2013–14 season. Grove had a poor 2013–14 season finishing bottom of the table which saw Ant Buckle replaced by Neil Gill in May 2014. However, after a poor start to the 2014–15 campaign Gill was sacked on 7 September 2014, being replaced by Paul Moore four days later. However Moore quit on 22 October 2014 blaming board interference. In his place came former manager Peter Ward.

== Ground ==
Kidsgrove play home matches at Hollinwood Road, in the Clough Hall area of Kidsgrove.

== Club records ==
Kidsgrove have yet to reach the first round of the FA Cup, but did reach the semi-finals of the FA Vase in 1997–98. Athletic have won the Staffordshire Senior Cup five times in 2004, 2007, 2009, 2011 and 2012.

- Best FA Cup performance: 4th qualifying round 2011–12; 2018–19
- Record Attendance: 1,903 v Tiverton Town, FA Vase Semi-final, 21 March 1998
- Record Victory: 23–0 v Cross Heath WMC, Staffordshire Cup 1965
- Record Defeat: 0–15 v Stafford Rangers, Staffordshire Senior Cup, 20 November 2001
- Top goalscorer: 159, Anthony Malbon, 2014–2022

== Honours ==
=== Leagues ===
- North West Counties Football League Premier Division
  - Champions: 1997–98, 2001–02
- Mid-Cheshire League
  - Champions: 1970–71, 1977–78, 1986–87, 1987–88
  - Runners-up: 1968–69, 1985–86
- Staffordshire County League
  - Champions: 1965–66
- Staffordshire County League Division Two
  - Champions: 1963–64

=== Cups ===
- Staffordshire Senior Cup
  - Winners: 2004, 2007, 2009, 2011, 2012
  - Runners-up: 2008
- Northern Premier League Chairman's Cup
  - Winners: 2005
- North West Counties League Challenge Cup
  - Winners: 1998
- North West Counties League Floodlit Trophy
  - Runners-up: 1999
- Mid Cheshire League Cup
  - Winners: 1968, 1970, 1986
  - Runner-up: 1985, 1987

== League history ==
Season	League									FA Cup	FA Trophy	FA Vase
Season	Division	P	W	D	L	F	A	Pts	Pos	FA Cup	FA Trophy	FA Vase
1966–67	Mid-Cheshire League	30	12	3	15	71	74	21	11/16			
1967–68	Mid-Cheshire League	34	16	6	12	76	62	38	8/18			
1968–69	Mid-Cheshire League	38	27	5	6	114	49	59	2/20			
1969–70	Mid-Cheshire League	34	24	4	6	104	41	52	3/18			
1970–71	Mid-Cheshire League	34	26	4	4	115	27	56	1/18			
1971–72	Mid-Cheshire League	34	21	10	3	110	48	52	3/18			
1972–73	Mid-Cheshire League	34	14	3	17	59	63	31	11/18			
1973–74	Mid-Cheshire League	36	14	15	7	58	44	43	7/18			
1974–75	Mid-Cheshire League	38	22	7	9	78	51	51	4/20			
1975–76	Mid-Cheshire League	32	11	8	13	50	50	30	9/17			
1976–77	Mid-Cheshire League	30	19	4	7	69	33	42	3/16			R1
1977–78	Mid-Cheshire League	30	14	5	11	49	51	33	7/16			R1
1978–79	Mid-Cheshire League	30	22	6	2	70	24	50	1/16			R2
1979–80	Mid-Cheshire League	30	8	10	12	46	39	26	12/16			PR
1980–81	Mid-Cheshire League	30	12	6	12	30	30	30	9/16			PR
1981–82	Mid-Cheshire League	30	12	7	11	35	35	31	8/16			PR
1982–83	Mid-Cheshire League	28	11	5	12	49	43	27	10/15			
1983–84	Mid-Cheshire League	34	11	10	13	51	41	32	12/18			
1984–85	Mid-Cheshire League	32	16	9	7	53	40	41	5/17			
1985–86	Mid-Cheshire League	34	24	6	4	107	38	54	2/18			
1986–87	Mid-Cheshire League	32	23	6	3	91	25	52	1/17			
1987–88	Mid-Cheshire League	30	24	5	1	87	24	53	1/16			
1988–89	Mid-Cheshire League	28	12	7	9	56	51	51	5/15			
1989–90	Mid-Cheshire League	30	14	2	14	54	66	44	8/16			
Joined North West Counties League Division Two
1990–91	NWCFL Division Two	34	7	10	17	37	65	31	14/18			
1991–92	NWCFL Division Two	34	14	7	13	44	45	49	10/18			R1
Promoted to Division One ahead of higher-placed teams due to ground grading
1992–93	NWCFL Division One	42	9	8	25	53	94	35	20/22			
1993–94	NWCFL Division One	42	16	10	16	70	61	58	10/22			
1994–95	NWCFL Division One	42	14	8	20	66	78	50	15/22			PR
1995–96	NWCFL Division One	42	15	9	18	61	64	54	13/22	QR1		R1
1996–97	NWCFL Division One	42	10	14	18	53	73	44	16/22	PR		QR2
1997–98	NWCFL Division One	42	32	3	7	127	50	99	1/22	PR		SF
1998–99	NWCFL Division One	40	24	7	9	90	47	79	5/21	QR1		R4
1999–00	NWCFL Division One	42	14	9	19	47	66	51	13/22	PR		R2
2000–01	NWCFL Division One	42	24	10	8	81	46	82	6/22	EPR		R1
2001–02	NWCFL Division One	42	31	9	4	125	47	102	1/22	PR		R4
Promoted to Northern Premier League First Division
2002–03	NPL First Division	42	9	11	22	49	71	38	19/22	QR2	R1	
2003–04	NPL First Division	42	10	9	23	45	67	39	22/22	PR	PR	
2004–05	NPL First Division	42	15	15	12	60	55	60	10/22	PR	R2	
2005–06	NPL First Division	42	14	9	19	66	69	51	17/22	QR1	QR2	
2006–07	NPL First Division	42	21	7	18	91	80	70	8/24	QR3	QR2	
2007–08	NPL Division One South	42	7	10	25	61	90	31	17/18	QR2	PR	
2008–09	NPL Division One South	38	12	5	21	49	62	41	15/20	QR1	QR1	
2009–10	NPL Division One South	42	22	12	8	93	50	78	4/22	QR1	PR	
2010–11	NPL Division One South	42	23	6	13	88	59	75	7/22	QR2	PR	
2011–12	NPL Division One South	42	13	16	13	62	59	55	13/22	QR4	QR1	
2012–13	NPL Division One South	42	12	7	23	75	86	43	18/22	PR	QR1	
2013–14	NPL Division One South	40	7	9	24	41	80	30	21/21	QR1	QR2	
2014–15	NPL Division One South	42	9	9	24	48	96	36	20/22	PR	PR	
2015–16	NPL Division One South	42	12	14	16	81	78	50	15/22	PR	QR2	
2016–17	NPL Division One South	42	16	7	19	72	66	55	12/22	QR2	QR2	
2017–18	NPL Division One South	42	11	2	22	69	90	42	18/22	QR2	QR2	
2018–19	NPL Division One West	38	15	13	10	58	40	58	10/20	QR4	PR	
2019–20	NPL Division One South East	27	11	6	10	42	31	39	10/20	QR3	QR1	
2020–21	NPL Division One South East	7	5	1	1	13	7	16	4/20	PR	R1	
2021–22	NPL Division One West	38	14	8	6	51	53	50	10/20	PR	QR3	
2022–23	NPL Division One West	38	13	12	13	49	55	51	8/20	PR	QR1	
