= 1998–99 Northern Premier League =

The 1998–99 Northern Premier League season was the 31st in the history of the Northern Premier League, a football competition in England. Teams were divided into two divisions; the Premier and the First. It was known as the Unibond League for sponsorship reasons.

== Premier Division ==
Northern Premier League Premier Division
- Season: 1998–99
- Champions: Altrincham
- Promoted: Altrincham
- Relegated: Accrington Stanley; Chorley
- Matches: 462
- Goals: 1,290 (2.79 per match)

The Premier Division featured four new teams:

- Gateshead relegated from the Football Conference
- Stalybridge Celtic relegated from the Football Conference
- Whitby Town promoted as champions of Division One
- Worksop Town promoted as runners-up of Division One

=== League table ===
Pos	Team	Pld	W	D	L	GF	GA	GD	Pts	Promotion or relegation
1	Altrincham (C, P)	42	23	11	8	67	33	+34	80	Promotion to Football Conference
2	Worksop Town	42	22	10	10	66	48	+18	76	
3	Guiseley	42	21	9	12	64	47	+17	72	
4	Bamber Bridge	42	18	15	9	63	48	+15	69	
5	Gateshead	42	18	11	13	69	58	+11	65	
6	Gainsborough Trinity	42	19	8	15	65	59	+6	65	
7	Whitby Town	42	17	13	12	77	62	+15	64	
8	Leigh RMI	42	16	15	11	63	54	+9	63	
9	Hyde United	42	16	11	15	61	48	+13	59	
10	Stalybridge Celtic	42	16	11	15	71	63	+8	59	
11	Winsford United	42	14	15	13	56	52	+4	57	
12	Runcorn	42	12	19	11	46	49	−3	55	
13	Emley	42	12	17	13	47	49	−2	53	
14	Blyth Spartans	42	14	9	19	56	64	−8	51	
15	Colwyn Bay	42	12	13	17	60	71	−11	49	
16	Frickley Athletic	42	11	15	16	55	71	−16	48	
17	Marine	42	10	17	15	61	69	−8	47	
18	Spennymoor United	42	12	11	19	52	71	−19	47	
19	Lancaster City	42	11	13	18	50	62	−12	46	
20	Bishop Auckland	42	10	15	17	49	67	−18	45	
21	Chorley (R)	42	8	15	19	45	68	−23	39	Relegation to NPL Division One
22	Accrington Stanley (R)	42	9	9	24	47	77	−30	36	Relegation to NPL Division One

Updated to match(es) played on 1 May 1999. Source: .
Rules for classification: 1) points; 2) goal difference; 3) number of goals scored.
(C) Champions; (P) Promoted; (R) Relegated

=== Results ===
Home \ Away	ACC	ALT	BAM	BIS	BLY	CHO	COL	EML	FRK	GAI	GAT	GUI	HYD	LNC	LEI	MAR	RUN	SPU	STL	WTB	WNS	WKS
Accrington Stanley		1–4	0–5	0–1	1–3	0–0	1–2	2–0	1–1	2–1	1–3	2–0	1–1	1–1	1–2	3–2	1–2	2–3	2–0	1–1	0–2	1–3
Altrincham	2–1		1–1	0–0	0–0	4–0	1–1	1–0	1–1	1–1	1–0	1–0	2–1	1–2	1–0	4–1	3–0	2–1	2–1	1–1	1–1	2–0
Bamber Bridge	1–1	0–1		2–2	1–0	1–0	1–1	1–2	3–2	1–4	3–1	4–1	1–1	4–2	1–1	2–2	1–2	5–1	2–1	1–1	1–1	3–2
Bishop Auckland	2–1	2–1	1–1		2–2	0–4	0–1	1–1	2–2	2–1	2–2	1–0	0–1	1–1	0–0	0–2	2–3	1–1	3–3	1–1	0–2	2–1
Blyth Spartans	0–1	0–0	0–1	2–1		0–0	4–4	0–2	2–2	0–2	1–2	4–1	1–2	1–0	4–1	2–1	1–1	4–0	3–2	0–5	0–3	0–1
Chorley	4–0	0–2	0–1	1–3	0–2		1–2	1–1	1–1	0–2	2–2	0–2	1–3	2–0	3–3	0–2	1–1	2–2	2–1	2–2	2–2	1–3
Colwyn Bay	3–1	1–1	0–1	0–3	2–0	2–1		3–3	0–2	3–4	1–1	0–0	2–1	0–0	0–1	1–0	1–3	1–3	1–2	3–1	1–2	2–2
Emley	3–1	0–3	0–1	2–0	2–1	1–0	0–0		1–1	3–2	1–2	0–1	1–1	1–1	0–2	1–1	1–1	1–0	2–2	0–1	1–1	2–2
Frickley Athletic	0–0	0–3	0–2	0–0	2–0	2–2	2–1	0–1		1–2	0–2	1–2	3–0	3–2	0–2	1–1	1–1	1–2	3–2	3–3	3–1	2–3
Gainsborough Trinity	0–4	0–3	0–1	2–1	3–4	3–0	3–1	1–2	4–1		1–1	2–2	0–1	1–0	2–0	3–0	1–1	3–1	1–4	2–0	0–0	3–1
Gateshead	3–0	0–1	2–0	4–1	0–1	0–0	3–2	2–1	2–3	0–2		1–0	0–3	7–1	1–3	2–2	2–2	0–1	2–1	1–1	2–1	3–2
Guiseley	4–0	2–0	3–0	1–0	1–2	4–0	2–2	1–1	3–0	2–1	3–2		1–0	1–0	2–0	2–0	2–0	2–1	1–1	0–3	2–3	2–1
Hyde United	3–2	0–1	1–1	5–0	0–1	3–4	2–2	0–1	2–0	1–2	3–0	3–1		1–1	1–2	1–1	2–0	3–0	1–1	3–2	2–0	0–0
Lancaster City	1–0	0–0	3–2	2–4	2–2	0–1	4–1	1–1	5–0	0–1	2–2	1–3	1–0		1–2	0–0	1–1	0–3	1–1	0–1	1–0	2–0
Leigh RMI	1–2	3–2	0–1	1–1	3–2	0–1	3–2	0–0	0–1	3–0	2–2	3–2	2–2	0–2		0–0	0–0	1–1	3–0	2–2	2–2	1–1
Marine	2–0	2–1	1–2	2–2	1–3	4–1	1–4	2–2	1–4	1–2	0–1	1–1	1–0	2–1	1–1		1–4	5–2	2–2	3–3	3–3	1–2
Runcorn	2–2	0–3	2–2	1–0	1–0	2–1	0–1	1–1	1–1	0–0	1–0	1–3	1–1	1–2	0–2	1–1		2–0	1–0	2–3	0–1	1–1
Spennymoor United	2–0	0–2	0–0	2–0	2–1	0–0	4–0	2–1	0–1	1–1	2–2	0–0	2–0	2–2	2–4	0–2	0–0		1–0	4–5	1–3	0–2
Stalybridge Celtic	1–3	3–1	1–1	3–1	4–0	1–1	1–0	2–0	2–2	2–0	0–3	2–2	2–1	3–1	4–4	2–1	1–2	3–0		2–0	1–0	3–0
Whitby Town	3–2	1–4	1–0	2–1	2–1	1–1	4–3	1–0	4–0	5–1	1–2	0–0	2–3	1–2	0–2	0–2	0–0	4–1	4–1		1–2	1–1
Winsford United	2–2	2–1	1–0	1–2	2–2	1–2	1–1	3–2	2–2	2–0	1–2	0–1	0–2	1–0	2–0	2–2	0–0	1–1	1–2	0–2		1–1
Worksop Town	1–0	3–1	1–1	3–1	1–0	2–0	1–2	0–2	2–0	1–1	2–0	3–1	2–0	3–0	2–1	1–1	2–1	2–1	2–1	2–1	1–0	

Updated to match(es) played on 1 May 1999. Source: Northern Premier Division results grid
Legend: Blue = home team win; Yellow = draw; Red = away team win.

== Division One ==
Northern Premier League Division One
- Season: 1998–99
- Champions: Droylsden
- Promoted: Droylsden; Hucknall Town
- Relegated: Alfreton Town; Great Harwood Town
- Matches: 462
- Goals: 1,446 (3.13 per match)

Division One featured four new teams:

- Alfreton Town relegated from the NPL Premier Division
- Burscough promoted as runners-up from the NWCFL Division One
- Hucknall Town promoted as champions from the NCEFL Premier Division
- Radcliffe Borough relegated from the NPL Premier Division

=== League table ===
Pos	Team	Pld	W	D	L	GF	GA	GD	Pts	Promotion or relegation
1	Droylsden (C, P)	42	26	8	8	97	55	+42	86	Promotion to Premier Division
2	Hucknall Town (P)	42	26	11	5	80	38	+42	86 (Note: Hucknall Town were docked 3 points.)	Promotion to Premier Division
3	Ashton United	42	22	12	8	79	46	+33	78	
4	Lincoln United	42	20	12	10	94	65	+29	72	
5	Eastwood Town	42	20	8	14	65	69	−4	68	
6	Radcliffe Borough	42	19	8	15	78	62	+16	65	
7	Burscough	42	19	8	15	67	61	+6	65	
8	Witton Albion	42	18	9	15	70	63	+7	63	
9	Bradford Park Avenue	42	17	11	14	64	55	+9	62	
10	Stocksbridge Park Steels	42	16	13	13	64	60	+4	61	
11	Harrogate Town	42	17	7	18	75	77	−2	58	
12	Gretna	42	16	10	16	73	80	−7	58	
13	Belper Town	42	15	11	16	58	57	+1	56	
14	Trafford	42	14	11	17	50	58	−8	53	
15	Netherfield Kendal	42	13	10	19	51	64	−13	49 (Note: From this season onwards Netherfield were known as Netherfield Kendal.)	
16	Flixton	42	12	12	18	50	64	−14	48	
17	Matlock Town	42	14	6	22	53	72	−19	48	
18	Farsley Celtic	42	11	13	18	56	73	−17	46	
19	Whitley Bay	42	10	9	23	53	77	−24	39	
20	Congleton Town	42	8	15	19	65	91	−26	39	
21	Great Harwood Town (R)	42	10	8	24	51	73	−22	38	Relegation to NWCFL Division One
22	Alfreton Town (R)	42	9	8	25	53	86	−33	35	Relegation to NCEFL Premier Division

Updated to match(es) played on 22 February 2011. Source: .
Rules for classification: 1) points; 2) goal difference; 3) number of goals scored.
(C) Champions; (P) Promoted; (R) Relegated

=== Results ===
Home \ Away	ALF	ASH	BLP	BPA	BUR	CNG	DRO	EAS	FAR	FLX	GHT	GRT	HAR	HUC	KEN	LIN	MAT	RAD	STO	TRA	WHI	WTN
Alfreton Town		1–7	0–3	2–2	0–1	2–1	0–2	3–0	2–2	0–0	1–3	0–1	1–1	1–2	1–2	2–2	3–2	1–1	1–3	0–3	2–1	1–3
Ashton United	4–2		1–0	1–0	3–1	1–1	1–1	2–0	3–0	2–0	3–0	4–2	3–2	0–0	1–1	1–1	1–0	2–1	0–2	1–1	6–3	0–2
Belper Town	1–2	0–2		3–1	2–0	2–1	3–0	0–3	2–1	1–1	1–1	2–1	2–2	0–0	1–0	4–1	1–0	1–1	0–1	1–2	5–3	2–2
Bradford Park Avenue	2–1	0–3	2–0		1–1	4–0	0–5	3–1	1–2	2–1	0–1	4–2	0–1	2–2	1–1	3–1	3–1	1–2	1–1	0–0	0–0	5–0
Burscough	2–1	2–3	2–1	1–1		3–2	1–3	2–0	1–0	3–0	0–2	2–0	2–0	0–3	0–1	2–1	0–1	1–0	1–2	2–2	2–1	4–0
Congleton Town	2–1	2–2	1–0	0–0	3–2		0–1	1–2	3–1	1–2	1–1	2–2	1–0	2–4	0–0	2–2	3–4	2–6	0–4	3–1	2–2	1–1
Droylsden	1–0	1–1	4–1	2–0	4–2	2–4		1–3	3–3	2–1	3–0	2–0	2–1	4–2	1–1	5–1	2–0	3–2	3–1	2–0	2–1	5–0
Eastwood Town	2–2	2–1	1–0	4–5	2–2	2–0	4–3		1–1	1–3	3–1	1–0	1–1	0–0	3–0	2–2	3–0	2–0	2–2	1–0	0–1	2–0
Farsley Celtic	3–1	1–1	2–1	0–2	1–4	2–2	1–1	2–0		4–0	3–1	5–3	1–2	0–3	2–0	0–0	1–1	0–0	2–0	0–2	1–2	0–1
Flixton	2–0	2–0	0–0	0–2	2–2	2–0	3–2	3–2	0–2		1–0	2–3	3–4	2–3	0–0	1–1	2–2	1–0	0–0	1–2	2–0	2–3
Great Harwood Town	5–1	1–1	0–1	3–4	2–5	2–2	0–1	0–2	2–0	0–1		2–2	0–1	1–0	4–0	1–4	0–1	1–2	0–0	1–2	2–1	1–1
Gretna	2–1	0–2	1–1	3–2	1–1	5–2	2–5	2–4	0–0	1–2	3–0		2–2	1–1	1–3	2–5	3–2	2–2	1–1	4–1	2–0	2–1
Harrogate Town	0–4	1–4	5–3	0–1	1–2	4–2	1–3	2–2	2–2	3–2	2–0	2–4		1–0	0–2	1–1	4–0	1–2	1–0	4–2	5–1	2–3
Hucknall Town	2–1	4–0	1–0	1–1	2–0	4–2	3–1	3–0	2–1	3–0	1–0	0–1	3–0		6–3	2–2	1–0	2–1	2–2	1–1	2–2	0–1
Kendal Town	1–0	1–1	1–2	1–0	4–5	1–1	0–2	3–0	4–0	1–1	3–2	0–1	2–3	0–2		1–2	1–2	0–3	0–4	4–2	1–3	1–0
Lincoln United	4–0	1–1	1–2	1–3	2–0	1–7	1–1	7–0	2–2	2–1	4–1	3–1	4–0	1–2	2–0		6–0	2–4	4–3	5–3	1–0	3–1
Matlock Town	0–3	1–0	1–3	0–1	2–0	2–2	3–3	1–2	3–0	3–0	1–2	2–0	2–5	0–1	0–1	0–2		3–1	2–0	2–1	2–3	1–3
Radcliffe Borough	2–3	2–1	3–3	2–0	1–0	1–1	3–2	4–0	5–2	2–2	2–4	1–3	3–2	1–3	1–1	0–1	3–1		0–1	4–1	2–1	3–1
Stocksbridge Park Steels	2–2	0–3	0–0	2–2	0–1	3–2	2–3	1–2	2–2	1–1	2–1	2–3	2–1	0–0	0–3	3–2	0–0	2–4		1–0	4–1	2–1
Trafford	3–1	2–1	1–1	0–1	0–1	1–1	2–1	0–1	0–1	1–0	2–1	1–1	3–0	1–2	1–0	0–1	0–0	1–0	1–3		1–1	1–1
Whitley Bay	0–2	1–3	1–0	1–0	1–1	4–0	1–1	0–1	4–3	2–0	4–1	0–2	0–2	2–3	2–2	0–4	1–2	0–1	1–2	1–1		0–0
Witton Albion	4–0	1–2	4–2	2–1	3–3	5–0	0–2	5–1	4–0	1–1	1–1	5–1	0–3	0–2	1–0	1–1	1–3	1–0	4–1	0–1	2–0	

Updated to match(es) played on 1 May 1999. Source: Northern Premier League First Division results grid
Legend: Blue = home team win; Yellow = draw; Red = away team win.

== Promotion and relegation ==
In the thirty-first season of the Northern Premier League Altrincham (as champions) were automatically promoted to the Football Conference. Chorley and Accrington Stanley were relegated to the First Division; these two clubs were replaced by relegated Conference sides Barrow and Leek Town, First Division winners Droylsden and second placed Hucknall Town. In the First Division Great Harwood Town and Alfreton Town left the League at the end of the season and were replaced by newly admitted Ossett Town and Workington.

== Cup results ==
=== Challenge Cup ===
Featuring teams from both leagues.

Quarterfinals
Hucknall Town	0
Farsley Celtic	0
Stalybridge Celtic	5
Burscough	2
Blyth Spartans	4
Droylsden	3
Guiseley	1^{2}
Accrington Stanley	1^{1}

Semifinals
Hucknall Town	1^{1}
Stalybridge Celtic	1^{2}
Blyth Spartans	0
Guiseley	2

Final
Stalybridge Celtic	2
Guiseley	1

=== President's Cup ===
'Plate' competition for losing teams in the NPL Cup.

- Droylsden 2–1 Leigh Railway Mechanics Institute

=== Peter Swales Shield ===
Between Champions of NPL Premier Division and Winners of the NPL Cup.

- Altrincham bt. Stalybridge Celtic
