= Hollinshed =

Hollinshed is a surname. Notable people with the surname include:

- Marjorie Hollinshed (1905–1995), Australian ballet dancer and dance teacher
- Ottiwell Hollinshed (fl. 1550s), Canon of Windsor from 1550 to 1554

== See also ==
- Hollinshead
- Holinshed
