= 1999–2000 Northern Premier League =

The 1999–2000 Northern Premier League season was the 32nd in the history of the Northern Premier League, a football competition in England. Teams were divided into two divisions; the Premier and the First.

== Premier Division ==
Northern Premier League Premier Division
- Season: 1999–2000
- Champions: Leigh RMI
- Promoted: Leigh RMI
- Relegated: Guiseley; Winsford United
- Matches: 506
- Goals: 1,426 (2.82 per match)

The Premier Division featured four new teams:

- Barrow relegated from the Football Conference
- Leek Town relegated from the Football Conference
- Droylsden promoted as champions of Division One
- Hucknall Town promoted as runners-up of Division One

=== League table ===
Pos	Team	Pld	W	D	L	GF	GA	GD	Pts	Promotion or relegation
1	Leigh RMI (C, P)	44	26	10	8	87	44	+43	88	Promotion to Football Conference
2	Hyde United	44	24	14	6	76	42	+34	86	
3	Gateshead	44	23	13	8	79	41	+38	82	
4	Marine	44	21	17	6	78	43	+35	80	
5	Emley	44	20	12	12	54	41	+13	72	
6	Stalybridge Celtic	44	18	13	13	62	51	+11	67	
7	Lancaster City	44	18	12	14	63	56	+7	66	
8	Runcorn	44	18	11	15	63	53	+10	65	
9	Bishop Auckland	44	18	11	15	63	61	+2	65	
10	Worksop Town	44	19	6	19	78	65	+13	63	
11	Gainsborough Trinity	44	16	15	13	58	48	+10	63	
12	Whitby Town	44	15	13	16	66	66	0	58	
13	Barrow	44	14	15	15	65	59	+6	57	
14	Droylsden	44	14	14	16	52	57	−5	56	
15	Blyth Spartans	44	15	9	20	62	67	−5	54	
16	Frickley Athletic	44	15	9	20	64	85	−21	54	
17	Hucknall Town	44	14	11	19	55	61	−6	53	
18	Bamber Bridge	44	13	13	18	66	65	+1	52	
19	Leek Town	44	14	10	20	58	79	−21	52	
20	Colwyn Bay	44	11	13	20	44	84	−40	46	
21	Spennymoor United	44	10	13	21	41	71	−30	42 (Note: Spennymoor United: 1 point deducted)	
22	Guiseley (R)	44	8	17	19	52	71	−19	41	Relegation to NPL Division One
23	Winsford United (R)	44	3	7	34	40	116	−76	16	Relegation to NPL Division One

Updated to match(es) played on 6 May 2000. Source:
Rules for classification: 1) points; 2) goal difference; 3) number of goals scored.
(C) Champions; (P) Promoted; (R) Relegated

=== Results ===
Home \ Away	BAM	BRW	BIS	BLY	COL	DRO	EML	FRK	GAI	GAT	GUI	HUC	HYD	LNC	LEE	LEI	MAR	RUN	SPU	STL	WTB	WNS	WKS
Bamber Bridge		2–3	4–0	1–1	1–2	1–3	0–1	2–1	0–0	0–3	2–2	1–1	0–0	6–1	5–0	2–2	0–2	2–0	2–0	1–4	2–2	2–1	2–3
Barrow	4–0		1–3	3–2	4–0	0–3	0–2	2–0	1–1	3–5	1–1	4–2	1–2	2–2	1–4	2–2	2–2	0–2	1–0	1–1	0–3	0–0	2–3
Bishop Auckland	0–1	1–3		1–1	4–0	1–0	1–1	3–2	0–0	1–1	1–0	3–1	2–2	1–1	1–1	1–1	0–2	2–0	0–3	1–0	4–0	4–1	1–2
Blyth Spartans	1–2	1–1	0–2		4–1	3–0	3–2	4–1	1–1	0–1	1–2	1–0	3–4	0–2	2–3	0–1	3–1	4–2	2–3	1–4	2–0	1–0	2–1
Colwyn Bay	0–7	0–0	0–1	0–0		1–2	0–1	1–0	0–0	1–3	0–2	2–0	2–3	1–1	1–1	3–5	0–5	1–1	0–2	0–0	2–0	2–0	3–1
Droylsden	2–0	0–3	1–0	1–0	1–2		1–1	1–1	1–0	2–2	3–0	0–0	1–3	3–4	1–2	0–2	0–1	1–0	0–1	1–0	3–2	3–0	0–2
Emley	3–0	0–0	2–0	2–0	1–2	1–0		1–3	0–0	1–1	1–1	1–1	0–1	0–0	0–0	3–1	0–2	1–0	2–0	0–1	2–1	3–2	1–2
Frickley Athletic	2–0	2–5	4–2	1–1	4–1	0–4	0–0		0–0	1–4	2–2	3–2	3–1	3–2	1–1	2–4	2–2	1–2	1–1	1–1	2–1	3–1	1–3
Gainsborough Trinity	1–0	1–3	4–1	0–1	2–0	2–1	2–1	1–2		1–2	0–0	5–2	1–1	1–0	3–2	4–3	0–0	1–1	4–0	1–1	1–1	3–0	2–0
Gateshead	2–1	0–0	0–0	3–0	6–0	1–1	0–1	2–0	0–1		3–1	0–0	2–3	4–0	2–1	1–1	2–0	0–3	6–2	2–0	0–0	2–0	3–2
Guiseley	2–4	0–0	0–3	2–1	2–2	2–0	1–1	0–1	1–3	1–1		1–2	0–1	0–1	1–1	0–3	1–3	2–2	3–1	2–2	0–1	2–2	0–1
Hucknall Town	2–1	0–3	1–0	0–1	2–2	3–3	2–0	2–3	1–0	1–0	1–1		0–1	1–3	2–0	1–2	2–0	1–1	0–0	4–0	3–2	4–0	0–1
Hyde United	3–1	1–0	1–1	5–2	3–0	2–0	2–3	2–3	4–0	1–1	2–0	4–3		4–1	2–0	1–2	1–1	0–0	2–1	1–0	4–1	2–0	0–0
Lancaster City	1–1	1–0	0–1	3–0	3–0	4–0	2–1	2–0	2–0	1–1	2–0	1–0	1–0		1–3	1–3	1–1	3–2	3–0	3–2	1–2	4–1	0–0
Leek Town	0–0	2–1	1–4	1–4	0–2	0–0	1–3	1–2	3–2	1–2	2–2	2–2	2–0	3–1		2–0	2–4	0–1	1–0	0–0	2–1	1–2	3–1
Leigh RMI	3–0	1–0	4–1	2–0	1–2	1–2	1–0	5–0	1–1	3–1	0–1	1–0	0–0	2–1	0–2		2–1	2–0	4–0	2–0	2–1	3–2	2–2
Marine	0–3	1–0	3–1	0–0	1–1	3–2	3–1	1–0	2–2	1–1	2–2	3–0	0–0	0–0	6–1	1–1		0–1	3–0	1–3	3–3	3–1	3–2
Runcorn	2–0	2–2	2–0	3–0	1–2	1–1	1–3	2–1	3–2	2–0	2–2	0–1	0–3	0–1	5–0	0–2	1–2		3–2	0–0	3–1	1–0	2–0
Spennymoor United	3–1	0–0	0–1	0–0	1–1	1–1	2–3	3–2	0–2	0–2	1–4	1–1	0–0	0–0	3–1	1–3	0–0	3–0		1–0	1–1	0–0	2–1
Stalybridge Celtic	2–2	3–1	5–0	2–0	3–1	0–0	0–0	2–3	2–0	1–0	2–1	2–1	3–1	1–1	3–2	1–3	0–3	1–1	1–0		0–3	4–1	4–3
Whitby Town	1–1	1–1	2–2	1–2	1–1	5–2	0–1	3–0	2–1	0–2	3–1	2–1	1–1	1–0	3–1	2–0	0–3	4–0	1–1	1–0		2–2	2–1
Winsford United	1–5	0–2	2–5	0–5	1–2	1–1	1–2	1–2	1–2	1–3	4–2	1–2	1–2	0–2	0–2	0–5	2–2	1–6	3–0	1–2	1–1		1–3
Worksop Town	0–2	0–2	1–2	2–2	4–2	1–1	0–1	4–0	2–1	1–2	1–2	1–0	1–1	4–1	2–0	0–3	0–1	0–3	5–1	2–1	4–1	9–0	

Updated to match(es) played on 6 May 2000. Source: Northern Premier Division results grid
Legend: Blue = home team win; Yellow = draw; Red = away team win.

== Division One ==
Northern Premier League Division One
- Season: 1999–2000
- Champions: Accrington Stanley
- Promoted: Accrington Stanley; Burscough
- Relegated: Flixton; Whitley Bay
- Matches: 462
- Goals: 1,380 (2.99 per match)

Division One featured four new teams:

- Accrington Stanley relegated from the Premier Division
- Chorley relegated from the Premier Division
- Ossett Town promoted as runners-up of the Northern Counties East Football League Premier Division
- Workington promoted as champions of the North West Counties Football League Division One

=== League table ===
Pos	Team	Pld	W	D	L	GF	GA	GD	Pts	Promotion or relegation
1	Accrington Stanley (C, P)	42	25	9	8	96	43	+53	84	Promotion to Premier Division
2	Burscough (P)	42	22	18	2	81	35	+46	84	Promotion to Premier Division
3	Witton Albion	42	23	15	4	88	46	+42	84	
4	Bradford Park Avenue	42	23	9	10	77	48	+29	78	
5	Radcliffe Borough	42	22	12	8	71	48	+23	78	
6	Farsley Celtic	42	19	11	12	66	52	+14	68	
7	Matlock Town	42	17	16	9	72	55	+17	67	
8	Ossett Town	42	17	8	17	77	55	+22	59	
9	Stocksbridge Park Steels	42	16	8	18	55	70	−15	56	
10	Eastwood Town	42	15	11	16	64	65	−1	55 (Note: Eastwood Town were docked 1 point.)	
11	Harrogate Town	42	14	12	16	65	67	−2	54	
12	Congleton Town	42	14	12	16	63	73	−10	54	
13	Chorley	42	13	15	14	53	64	−11	54	
14	Ashton United	42	12	16	14	65	67	−2	52	
15	Workington	42	13	13	16	49	55	−6	52	
16	Lincoln United	42	13	12	17	52	80	−28	51	
17	Belper Town	42	13	11	18	59	72	−13	50	
18	Trafford	42	11	12	19	55	63	−8	45	
19	Gretna	42	11	7	24	48	78	−30	40	
20	Netherfield Kendal	42	8	9	25	46	82	−36	33	Changed their name to Kendal Town
21	Flixton (R)	42	7	9	26	47	85	−38	30	Relegation to NWCFL Division One
22	Whitley Bay (R)	42	7	9	26	41	87	−46	30	Relegation to Northern League Division One

Updated to match(es) played on 22 February 2011. Source:
Rules for classification: 1) points; 2) goal difference; 3) number of goals scored.
(C) Champions; (P) Promoted; (R) Relegated

=== Results ===
Home \ Away	ACC	ASH	BLP	BPA	BUR	CHO	CNG	EAS	FAR	FLX	GRT	HAR	KEN	LIN	MAT	OST	RAD	STO	TRA	WHI	WTN	WRK
Accrington Stanley		2–1	4–1	2–1	2–2	0–0	1–0	2–2	3–0	2–0	3–2	5–0	4–1	10–1	0–0	2–1	1–3	4–1	1–2	3–0	0–0	4–1
Ashton United	1–2		3–0	2–2	0–0	1–2	1–1	3–1	1–1	2–0	3–1	2–1	1–0	2–3	1–1	2–4	1–4	2–2	0–1	2–2	2–2	1–1
Belper Town	1–2	4–1		0–0	0–3	1–1	1–2	1–1	0–3	5–1	2–1	1–0	2–2	0–2	1–0	2–1	3–2	0–1	3–2	1–2	2–2	1–2
Bradford Park Avenue	1–0	2–3	2–1		1–1	4–1	3–2	1–0	1–1	3–1	6–0	2–2	3–0	4–1	4–3	1–0	1–1	2–0	3–0	1–0	2–2	1–0
Burscough	1–1	1–0	3–1	1–2		1–0	5–0	5–0	2–0	3–0	4–0	2–2	4–3	1–1	2–2	3–2	1–2	4–1	1–0	1–0	1–1	0–0
Chorley	2–3	1–1	0–1	2–1	2–2		0–1	0–0	3–0	1–1	0–1	3–1	3–0	1–1	2–2	3–3	1–1	0–3	0–4	0–0	2–5	0–0
Congleton Town	2–3	1–1	2–2	2–1	2–2	2–1		2–2	2–1	1–0	2–1	0–3	5–1	1–2	1–2	1–0	2–0	0–0	1–2	1–3	0–1	1–2
Eastwood Town	1–7	0–0	2–0	0–1	0–2	0–1	1–2		2–5	1–1	2–0	1–2	2–1	3–0	1–1	2–1	4–0	1–1	4–0	6–0	1–3	1–1
Farsley Celtic	2–1	2–1	3–1	4–1	0–0	1–2	1–0	1–3		3–1	0–1	4–3	0–1	0–0	1–1	2–1	2–1	2–1	4–0	0–0	1–0	1–1
Flixton	0–5	1–3	2–1	0–1	0–1	1–2	2–1	2–3	2–1		4–0	2–2	2–0	1–1	0–1	1–3	1–2	2–4	3–5	2–0	0–1	0–0
Gretna	0–1	1–1	3–4	1–2	0–2	3–2	3–3	1–1	1–1	1–2		2–0	4–1	4–1	2–5	2–0	0–1	1–0	1–1	1–0	0–3	1–3
Harrogate Town	0–2	1–1	2–2	0–3	1–2	1–3	5–0	2–0	0–5	0–0	3–2		3–0	0–0	1–1	0–1	1–1	6–1	1–1	1–0	1–1	2–0
Kendal Town	1–0	3–4	1–1	1–1	4–7	1–1	1–2	1–3	0–1	3–0	0–2	0–1		2–1	1–0	1–1	0–0	0–1	3–3	3–2	0–4	0–1
Lincoln United	1–0	2–2	1–1	2–1	0–1	1–2	0–2	2–2	2–2	3–3	1–0	2–1	2–1		3–2	1–5	1–2	1–2	0–3	2–1	1–2	3–2
Matlock Town	2–1	1–1	3–4	2–2	1–1	1–2	2–2	2–1	3–0	3–2	2–1	3–3	1–2	0–0		2–1	0–1	3–1	3–1	5–0	2–2	3–2
Ossett Town	2–2	4–0	1–1	3–1	1–1	3–0	0–0	1–2	2–0	3–2	2–1	1–2	1–0	1–2	3–1		2–2	4–1	0–1	1–2	1–2	3–1
Radcliffe Borough	2–3	2–0	1–1	2–1	0–0	1–1	3–3	3–2	2–1	2–0	0–0	3–1	1–1	2–2	1–2	2–0		3–1	0–1	4–1	1–0	1–0
Stocksbridge Park Steels	1–3	2–1	1–0	2–1	0–2	1–2	3–1	0–2	1–1	3–1	1–0	2–1	3–2	2–1	0–1	0–2	2–4		1–0	3–2	1–2	1–1
Trafford	2–4	0–2	1–2	2–0	1–1	6–0	2–2	1–2	0–1	2–2	0–1	2–3	0–0	2–0	0–1	0–0	0–1	3–3		1–2	1–1	1–1
Whitley Bay	1–1	1–3	2–1	1–3	1–1	1–3	5–3	0–1	1–3	4–0	0–0	1–2	1–3	0–1	0–0	1–7	1–6	1–0	1–1		2–4	1–2
Witton Albion	0–0	3–2	2–0	0–2	1–1	2–0	1–2	4–1	2–3	2–2	6–1	3–1	2–1	3–1	1–1	3–2	3–0	1–1	2–0	2–0		2–2
Workington	1–0	2–4	2–3	0–2	0–3	1–1	1–2	2–0	2–2	1–0	3–1	0–3	2–0	4–0	0–1	0–3	0–1	0–0	2–0	2–0	1–1	

Updated to match(es) played on 6 May 2000. Source: Northern Premier League First Division results grid
Legend: Blue = home team win; Yellow = draw; Red = away team win.

== Promotion and relegation ==
In the thirty-second season of the Northern Premier League Leigh RMI (as champions) were automatically promoted to the Football Conference. Guiseley and Winsford United were relegated to the First Division; these two clubs were replaced by relegated Conference side Altrincham, First Division winners Accrington Stanley and second placed Burscough. In the First Division Flixton and Whitley Bay left the League at the end of the season and were replaced by newly admitted North Ferriby United and Vauxhall Motors.

== Cup Results ==
Challenge Cup: Teams from both leagues.

- Lancaster City bt. Worksop Town

President's Cup: 'Plate' competition for losing teams in the NPL Cup.

- Trafford bt. Whitby Town

Chairman's Cup: 'Plate' competition for losing teams in the NPL Cup.

- Hyde United bt. Emley

Peter Swales Shield: Between Champions of NPL Premier Division and Winners of the NPL Cup.

- Leigh Railway Mechanics Institute 2–1 Lancaster City
