= Clough Hall =

Suburb in Staffordshire, England

Coordinates: 53.0844°N 2.2601°W

- Location within Staffordshire
- OS grid reference: SJ826541
- District: Newcastle-under-Lyme
- Shire county: Staffordshire
- Region: West Midlands
- Country: England
- Sovereign state: United Kingdom
- Post town: STOKE-ON-TRENT
- Postcode district: ST7
- Dialling code: 01782
- Police: Staffordshire
- Fire: Staffordshire
- Ambulance: West Midlands
- UK Parliament: Staffordshire Moorlands

Clough Hall is a suburb of Kidsgrove in the Borough of Newcastle-under-Lyme, Staffordshire.

== History ==
The earliest trace of any buildings near Clough Hall dates back to the 1440s.
