= Shaun Hollinshead =

English footballer

Personal information
- Full name: Shaun Hollinshead
- Date of birth: 21 February 1961 (age 65)
- Place of birth: Sandbach, England
- Position: Midfielder

Senior career*
Years	Team	Apps	(Gls)
1977–1978	Crewe Alexandra	5	(0)
1979–1980	Congleton Town	16	(1)
- Eastwood Hanley
- Kidsgrove Athletic
- Newcastle Town
- Rhyl

Managerial career
- Congleton Vale
- Alsager Town
- 20??–2012: Stone Dominoes
- 2012–2013: Kidsgrove Athletic
- 2013–20??: Eccleshall
- * Club domestic league appearances and goals

Shaun Hollinshead (born 21 February 1961) is an English footballer who played in the Football League for Crewe Alexandra. After ending his semi-pro career he turned to management.

== Career ==
Hollinshead was born in Sandbach and began his career with Crewe Alexandra. He made five appearances under manager Harry Gregg but failed to forge a career in professional football and became a foreman groundsman with Cheshire County Council and played semi-pro football with Congleton Town, Eastwood Hanley, Kidsgrove Athletic, Newcastle Town and Rhyl.

He turned to management with Congleton Vale and Alsager Town and had a successful spell with Stone Dominoes. He was appointed manager of Kidsgrove Athletic in the summer of 2012. He was sacked in April 2013.

Hollinshead was appointed manager of Eccleshall in November 2013.
