= Cyril Hollinshead =

English cricketer

Personal information
- Full name: Cyril Hollinshead
- Born: 26 May 1902; Timberland, Lincolnshire, England
- Died: 25 November 1995 (aged 93); Cheltenham, Gloucestershire, England
- Batting: Left-handed
- Bowling: Left-arm fast-medium

Domestic team information
- Years: Team
- 1931: Lincolnshire
- 1946: Gloucestershire

Career statistics
Competition	FC
Matches	1
Runs scored	–
Batting average	–
100s/50s	–/–
Top score	–
Balls bowled	30
Wickets	–
Bowling average	–
5 wickets in innings	–
10 wickets in match	–
Best bowling	–
Catches/stumpings	–/–
- Source: Cricinfo, 13 September 2010

Cyril Hollinshead (26 May 1902 – 25 November 1995) was an English cricketer. Hollinshead was a left-handed batsman who bowled left-arm fast-medium. He was born at Timberland, Lincolnshire.

In 1931, Hollinshead played a single Minor Counties Championship match for Lincolnshire against Bedfordshire. Fifteen years later, following the Second World War, he played a single first-class match for Gloucestershire against Cambridge University at the Wagon Works Ground in Gloucester. In his only first-class match he wasn't required to bat and bowled 5 wicketless overs. In 1947, he represented the Gloucestershire Second XI in a Minor Counties Championship match against the Surrey Second XI at The Oval.

Hollinshead died at Cheltenham, Gloucestershire on 25 November 1995.
