= Tetley Walker F.C. =

Coordinates: 53.40911°N 2.5874°W

- Founded: 1973
- Dissolved: 2001
- Ground: Long Lane
- Capacity: 2,000
- 2000–01: North West Counties Football League Division Two, 2nd

Tetley Walker F.C. was a football club based in Warrington, England. The club started in the local Warrington leagues before making the step up to the North West Counties Football League. The club had a successful seven seasons in the NWCFL Division Two, winning the NWCFL Division Two league cup, reaching the Fourth Round of the FA Vase and finishing runners-up in the league, before folding in 2001 due to being evicted from their home ground, Long Lane.

== History ==
The club was formed in 1974 in Warrington. The club originally played in the Warrington Soccer Leagues, and joined the North West Counties Football League Division Two in 1994. The club played at this level for seven seasons, winning the Second Division Trophy in 1998, before folding in 2000–01, despite finishing as runners-up in the league. The club folded due to being evicted from their ground at Long Lane for not contributing financially to the sports club to which they were affiliated.

In 1995–96 and 1996–97 the club competed in the FA Vase, reaching the Fourth Round in the latter season before being knocked out by Durham City. It was during this match that the club achieved its record attendance of 200.

== Honours ==
- North West Counties Football League Division Two
  - Runners-up 2000–01
- North West Counties Football League Division Two Trophy
  - Winners 1997–98
  - Runners-up 1999–2000

== Records ==
- FA Vase
  - Fourth Round 1996–97
