= Ramsbottom United F.C. =

English football club in Greater Manchester

Coordinates: 53°38′41.07″N 2°18′48.20″W

Ramsbottom United
- Full name: Ramsbottom United Football Club
- Nickname: The Rams
- Founded: 1966; 60 years ago
- Ground: Harry Williams Riverside Stadium; Ramsbottom, Bury
- Capacity: 2,000
- Chairman: Harry Williams
- Manager: Rob Henry
- League: North West Counties League Premier Division
- 2025–26: North West Counties League Premier Division, 2nd of 24
- Website: ramsbottomutd.com
Home colours	Away colours

Ramsbottom United Football Club are an English football club based in Ramsbottom, Greater Manchester. Nicknamed "The Rams", they currently compete in the North West Counties League Premier Division and play their home matches at the Harry Williams Riverside Stadium, Acrebottom, Ramsbottom. They are full members of the Lancashire County Football Association.

== History ==
The club was founded in 1966 by present chairman Harry Williams. They first played in the Bury Amateur League.

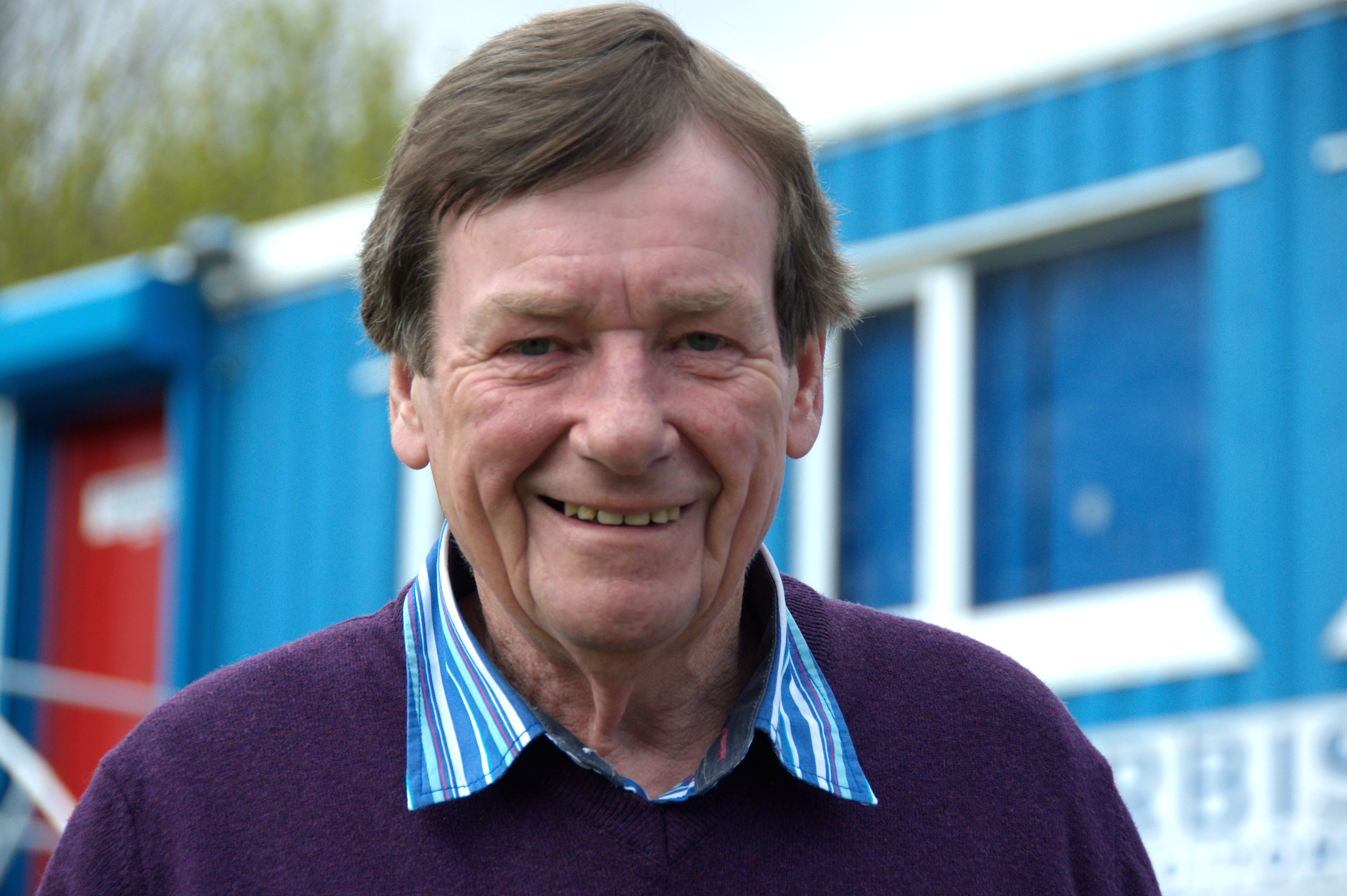
Founder and club chairman Harry Williams.

In 1969 Ramsbottom moved leagues to the Bolton Combination. In the 1972–1973 season they won the Division One Championship and in the 1976–1977 season they won the Premier Division. The Rams spent a total of twenty years in this league before moving in 1989 to the Manchester League, playing in Division One. The 1989–90 they finished in third place, and the following season were Division One champions, earning promotion to the Premier Division, where they spent the next four seasons. At the end of the 1994–95 season, the club applied to the North West Counties Football League and following substantial ground improvements, were admitted into the league's Second Division in June 1995.

In their first season, The Rams finished twelfth and also won the Second Division Trophy with a 2–1 victory over Cheadle Town at Darwen's Anchor Ground. The following season they were crowned Second Division champions, pipping local rivals Haslingden on goal difference on the last day of the season. On 9 November 1996 they beat Stantondale 9–0, setting a club record winning margin and they also won all of their first 17 home fixtures. The club also entered the FA Vase for the first time, losing in the first qualifying round 0–1 at home to Tetley Walker.

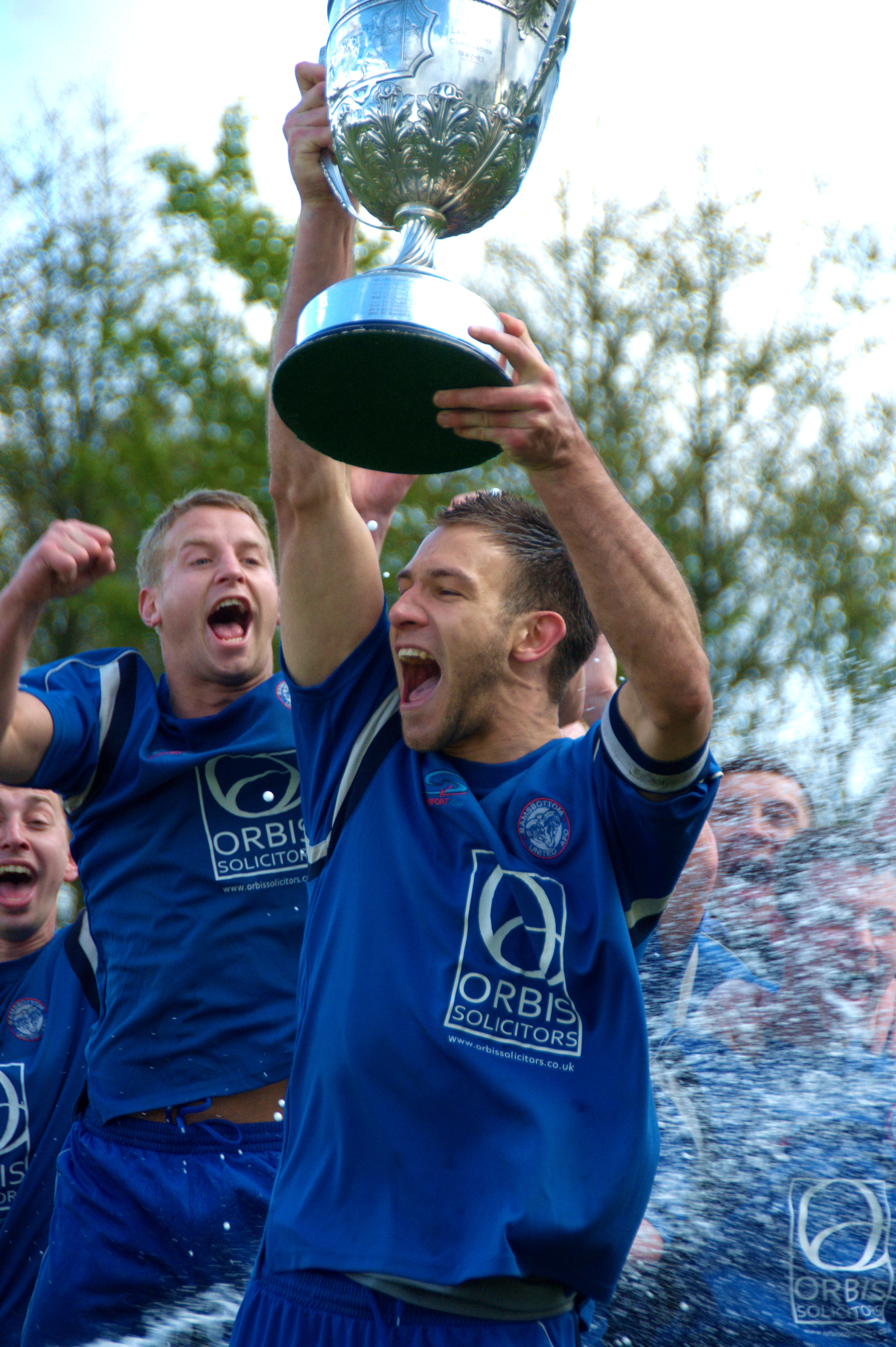
Team Captain Andy Dawson lifts the 2011–12 league trophy.

The 1997–98 season, The Rams first season in First Division, the club finished Seventeenth. The following season saw the club finish in Eleventh place and also enter the FA Cup for the first time. They beat Maine Road 2–1 in a replay in the preliminary round, then won 3–0 at home to Shildon in the first qualifying round. In the second qualifying round they beat Billingham Town 3–0 before losing 0–5 at home to Conference National club Southport in the third qualifying round.

The 1999–2000 season saw a third-place finish, on 79 points. Russell Brierley became the club's top scorer in any one season with 38 league goals. In the following season they finished third again, this time on 88 points. In the 2001–2002 season the club finished fifteenth. Further mid-table finishes continued in the early 2000s, with a fifth-place in 2004–05, which also included a league double over eventual champions Fleetwood Town.

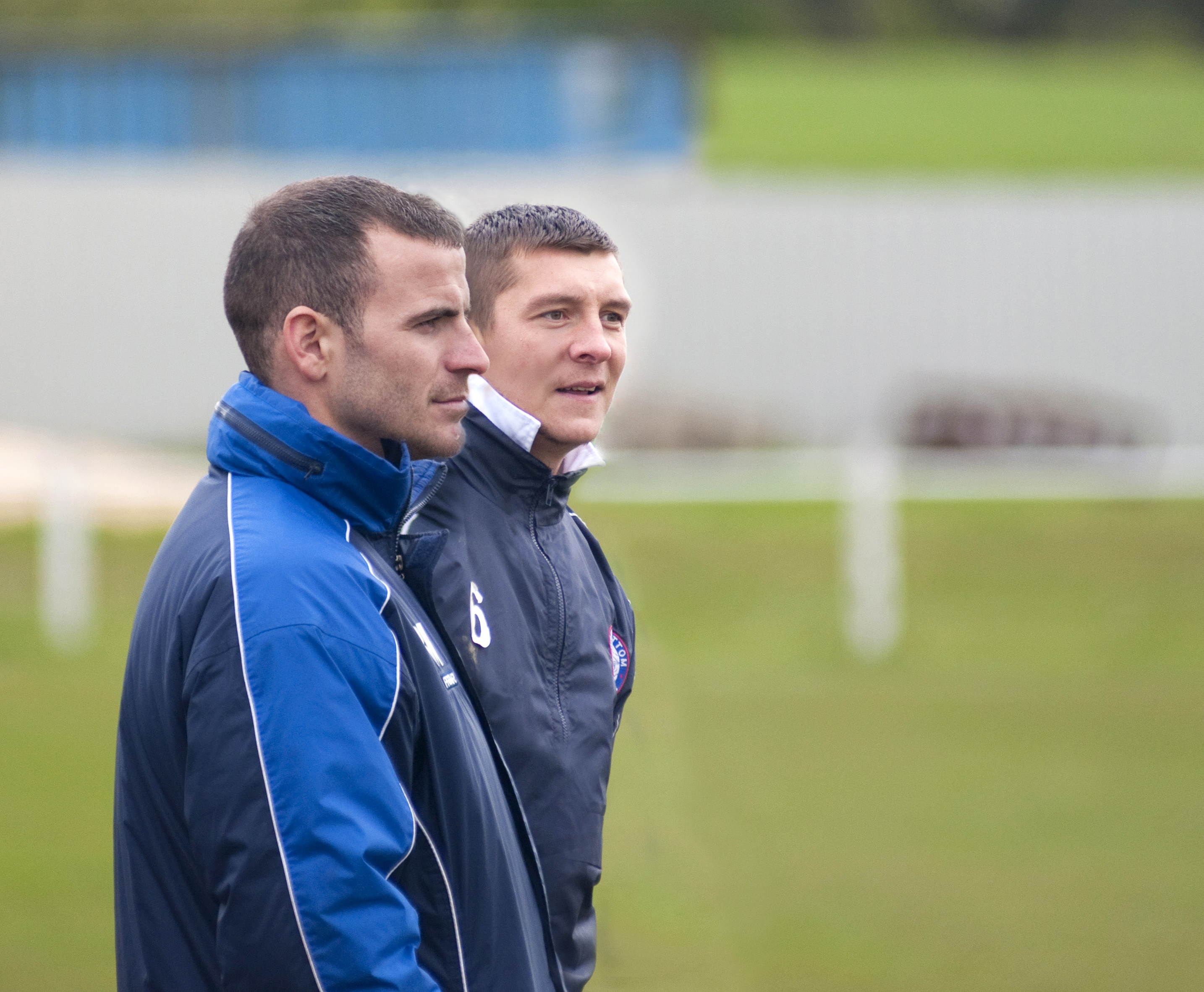
Former management duo Bernard Morley (left) and Anthony Johnson.

The Rams won the Bolton Hospitals Cup in the 2005–06 season with a 2–1 victory over Eagley at the Reebok Stadium, Bolton. In the league they finished in 18th place. The following season they finished 8th and won the Bolton Hospitals Cup again. And in 2007–08 they completed a third successive Bolton Hospitals Cup win, while finishing in 16th place in the league. The following season was once again seen as a disappointment, a 14th-placed finish and being unable to retain the hospital's cup led to both manager and caretaker manager losing their jobs.

The 2009–10 season saw two former players return as joint managers, 26-year-old Anthony Johnson and 25-year-old Bernard Morley. The team finished in 4th place with a new club record of fourteen away victories. The following season (2010–11) was even better as the team once again broke plenty of club records including its highest ever finish in the club's history by taking the runners-up trophy.

The 2011–12 season saw the club take the Premier Division title, gaining not only promotion to the Northern Premier League Division One North but also giving the club its highest-ever finish. The side broke many club records – 31 league wins, 16 away league wins, 108 league goals scored, and 96 points amassed, were just a few of the season's highlights, as well as numerous 'Player of the Month' awards being won. At the North West Counties AGM dinner in Blackpool, joint managers Johnson and Morley were awarded with the Managers of the Year award.

The 2012–13 season saw the club play in the Northern Premier League for the first time. The team missed out on a play-off place in the last minutes of the season: needing a single point, for which a draw would have sufficed, after 81 minutes the team were 1–0 up before division champions Skelmersdale United scored two late goals. The club finished in 6th place and two of its players, Lee Gaskell and Gary Stopforth, were named in the league's 'Team of the Year'.

2013–14 proved to be Ramsbottom's best season to date. Despite being deducted three points towards the end of the season, they managed to take fifth place and the last play-off spot. They proceeded to defeat Darlington 1883 in the semi-finals, before passing Bamber Bridge 3–2 after extra time in the final, reaching the Northern Premier League Premier Division, the seventh tier of English football, for the first time in their history.

After six years in the role, joint managers Johnson and Morley resigned in January 2015, moving to manage Salford City. The club appointed former player Jon Robinson as new manager. Along with the management duo, the club lost quite a few of their influential players to Salford City at this time. Whilst the club succeeded in staying in the Northern Premier League Premier Division for the start 2015–16 season, they never really recovered from the player and management losses and the club were relegated for the first time in their 50-year history at the end of the 2015–16 season. 2016–17 saw a mid table finish in the Evo Stik North Division 1, Mark Fell and Paul Fildes were appointed in May 2016 with former league player Gareth Seddon signed. It was an inconsistent season with Fildes sacked after the Boxing Day defeat to Radcliffe, leaving Fell in sole charge. They were relegated to the ninth tier in the 2022–23 season.

== Stadium ==
Ramsbottom play their home games at the Harry Williams Riverside Stadium, which is situated near the town centre, next to the East Lancashire Railway line and Ramsbottom Cricket Club. The ground was given the name of their long-serving chairman form the 2010–11 season. It is fully enclosed and behind one goal is a long covered stand named after long serving club stalwart Jack Wolfenden. The other goal has terracing behind it, over which covers were erected in 2013. One side of the pitch has two smaller covered stands, situated either side of the halfway line. Floodlights were installed in the 1996–97 season, acquired from Oldham RLFC's Watersheddings stadium.

Ground developments during the summer of 2013 saw the addition of a large sponsors' lounge, however, the Boxing Day floods of 2015 caused significant damage to the whole stadium including the sponsors' lounge.

== Players ==
As of 9 November 2023.

Note: Flags indicate national team as defined under FIFA eligibility rules; some limited exceptions apply. Players may hold more than one non-FIFA nationality.

No.	Pos.	Nation	Player
—			Black, Johnny (captain)
—			Chingwaro, Kuda
—			Collinge, Owen
—			Dudley, Matthew
—			Forbes, Jamie
—			Gallagher, Conal
—			Greenwood, Liam
—			Hamer, Ryan
—			Hayhurst, Harvey
—			Howson, Phteven (Hoofer)
—			Jackson, Martyn
—			Finlay Bartram
—			Lockett, Ryan
—			Lungenyi, Manasse
—			Marshall, Lloyd
—			Massamba, Chappy
—			McKerney, Aidan
—			Ogunby, Henri
—			Radcliffe, Oscar
—			Rigby, Sam
—			Roscoe, Luke
—			Sephton, Luke
—			Sotona, Damola
—			Ujahchuku, Emmanuel
—			Walder, Maine
—			Walker, Tom
—			Whittingham, Richard
—			Whyte, Harvey
—			Wood, Austin
—			Yates, Alex

== Non-playing staff ==
Name	Role
(England) Harry Williams	Chairman
(England) Tony Cunningham	Vice-Chairman
(England) Phillip Rose	President
(England) Chris Newton	Secretary
(England) Gareth Schofield	Matchday Secretary
(England) Rob Henry	Manager
(England) Richard Thomas	Assistant Manager
(England) Steven Ryan	Coach
(England) Lewis Hindley	Goalkeeper Coach
(England) Tony Dunn	First Aider

Source:Club details

== Notable former players ==
- Andy Barlow
- Dale Jennings
- Anthony Johnson
- Tom Kennedy
- Dominic McHale
- Bernard Morley
- Joel Pilkington
- Gareth Seddon
- Andrew Teague

== Records ==
- Best FA Cup performance: Third qualifying round, 1998–99
- Best FA Trophy performance: Third round, 2018–19 (replay)
- Best FA Vase performance: Third round, 2003–04, 2023–24, 2025–26

== Honours ==
=== League ===
- Northern Premier League Division One North
  - Play-off Winners: 2013–14
- North West Counties Football League Premier Division
  - Champions: 2011–12
  - Runners-up: 2010–11
- North West Counties Football League Division Two
  - Champions: 1996–97
- Manchester Football League Division One
  - Champions: 1990–91
- Bolton Combination Premier Division
  - Champions: 1976–77
- Bolton Combination Division One
  - Champions: 1972–73
  - Runners-up: 1984–85
- Bolton Combination Division Two
  - Runners-up: 1982–83

=== Cup ===
- North West Counties Football League Second Division Trophy
  - Winners: 1995–96
- Bolton Hospitals Cup
  - Winners: 1974–75 1998–99 2005–06, 2006–07, 2007–08
  - Runners-up: 2001–02
- Bolton Combination Jackson Cup
  - Winners: 1979–80
  - Runners-up: 1981–82 1985–86
- Bolton Combination Open Cup
  - Winners: 1976–77 1983–84
  - Runners-up: 1987–88

== Attendances ==
=== Records ===
- Largest attendance: 2,138 vs Bury, North West Counties Premier Division, 20 April 2024

=== Averages ===
At the end of the 2019–20 season, the average league-game attendance at the Harry Williams Riverside Stadium for the 2019–20 season was 307.

Past averages (league only):

- 2020–21: 278* (at Lockdown 2)
- 2019–20: 307
- 2018–19: 225
- 2017–18: 210
- 2016–17: 221
- 2015–16: 218
- 2014–15: 354
- 2013–14: 262
- 2012–13: 233
- 2011–12: 197
- 2010–11: 151
- 2009–10: 135
- 2008–09: 115
- 2007–08: 123
- 2006–07: 214
- 2005–06: 141
- 2004–05: 159
- 2003–04: 133

Source: English football site
