= Skelmersdale United F.C. =

Association football club in Skelmersdale, England

Coordinates: 53.55725°N 2.80169°W

Skelmersdale United
- Full name: Skelmersdale United Football Club
- Nicknames: Blueboys; Skem
- Founded: 1882
- Ground: Community Ground, Burscough
- Capacity: 1500
- Chairman: Frank Hughes
- Manager: Richard Brodie
- League: Liverpool County Premier League Premier Division
- 2025–26: Liverpool County Premier League Premier Division, 12th of 14
- Website: https://nycdaweeklydraw.co.uk/floatingfund/
Home colours	Away colours

Skelmersdale United Football Club is a football club from Skelmersdale, Lancashire. They are currently members of the Liverpool County Premier League and play at the Community Ground, Burscough. The club is a member of both the Liverpool County Football Association and the Lancashire County Football Association.

== History ==
=== The first 75 years ===
The club had its genesis in a team of players brought together by the teachers of the Skelmersdale Wesleyan Day School and was first called "Skelmersdale Young Rovers", the school headmaster at the time being Mr. Ritson. Riston was succeeded by Mr. Forster of St Helens, a keen football enthusiast. Under his guidance, the team became a much stronger organization and the name was changed to "Skelmersdale Wesleyans", subsequently the minister expressed his disapproval of this name and the team became "Skelmersdale United".

Nearly 10 years after their formation, United joined the newly created Lancashire Combination in 1891–92. Skelmersdale was a small mining community with a population of a little over 5,000, and they were paired up with the reserve sides of clubs that were in the top flight of English football, Blackburn Rovers, Bolton Wanderers and Preston North End. The club won its first major trophy in 1908 when they defeated Portsmouth Rovers in the final of the Lancashire Junior Shield. They joined the Liverpool County Combination in 1909 and won the first of their Championship titles in 1911. They competed in the League until 1955, during which time they were Champions on 10 occasions, Liverpool County FA Challenge Cup Winners on 8 occasions and George Mahan Cup Winners 5 times. For the majority of their first 70 years the club played at Sandy Lane, which is now the site of an office block.

Tom Tinsley, who played for just four seasons (either side of the war), created a record by scoring 214 goals despite many games missed due to Army call ups.

For the 1955–56 season, the club moved into the 2nd Division of the Lancashire Combination, and in their first season, they lifted the Championship. It was at this time they also moved into their new home - White Moss Park.

=== A new team for a new town ===
Skelmersdale became a designated new town in 1961 and ushered in a whole new era for the area. Around the same time, in August 1961, Wesley Bridge was made Secretary and Manager of United and began the radical restructuring of the club. In 1966–67, the changes began to pay dividends on the pitch. The FA Amateur Cup quarter final victory against Slough Town saw record attendance at Whitemoss Park (Sandy Lane) – 7,500 – in March 1967. That same year, United won their way to the FA Amateur Cup Final at Wembley Stadium in front of 75,000 spectators (which, at the time, was the biggest Wembley attendance for any game other than an FA Cup Final, League Cup or international game). A 0–0 draw with Enfield F.C. resulted in a replay at Maine Road, Manchester. Whilst United lost 3–0, the experience was the basis of an extraordinarily successful period in their history. The following season, United lost away to Football League club Scunthorpe United in the first round of the FA Cup. In 1968–69, United again qualified for the FA Cup first round only to lose away to Football League club Chesterfield. The same season, after transferring from the down-graded Lancashire Combination to the Cheshire County League, United won the league championship, a feat they would repeat the following year. The club also got through to the semi-finals of the FA Amateur Cup, another feat that they would repeat the next year. In 1970–71, United won the FA Amateur Cup in a 4–1 thrashing of Dagenham at Wembley. Despite only finishing third in the Cheshire County League, United also secured promotion to the Northern Premier League, the highest level the club had ever played. In 1971–72, United finished in the top half of the Northern Premier League, and qualified again for the first round of the FA Cup where they were beaten at home by football league club Tranmere Rovers.

=== Decline and revival ===
By 1976, United had dropped back into the Lancashire Combination. In 1982, when the Combination was amalgamated with the Cheshire County League to form the North West Counties League (NWCL), United found themselves in Division Two of the NWCL. The club reached the inaugural League Challenge Cup Final, only losing in a replay to Darwen. In 1987, the NWCL was restructured when a large number of clubs left to join the Northern Premier League. This restructuring saw the club move up to the NWCL First Division, United struggled for three seasons before being relegated.

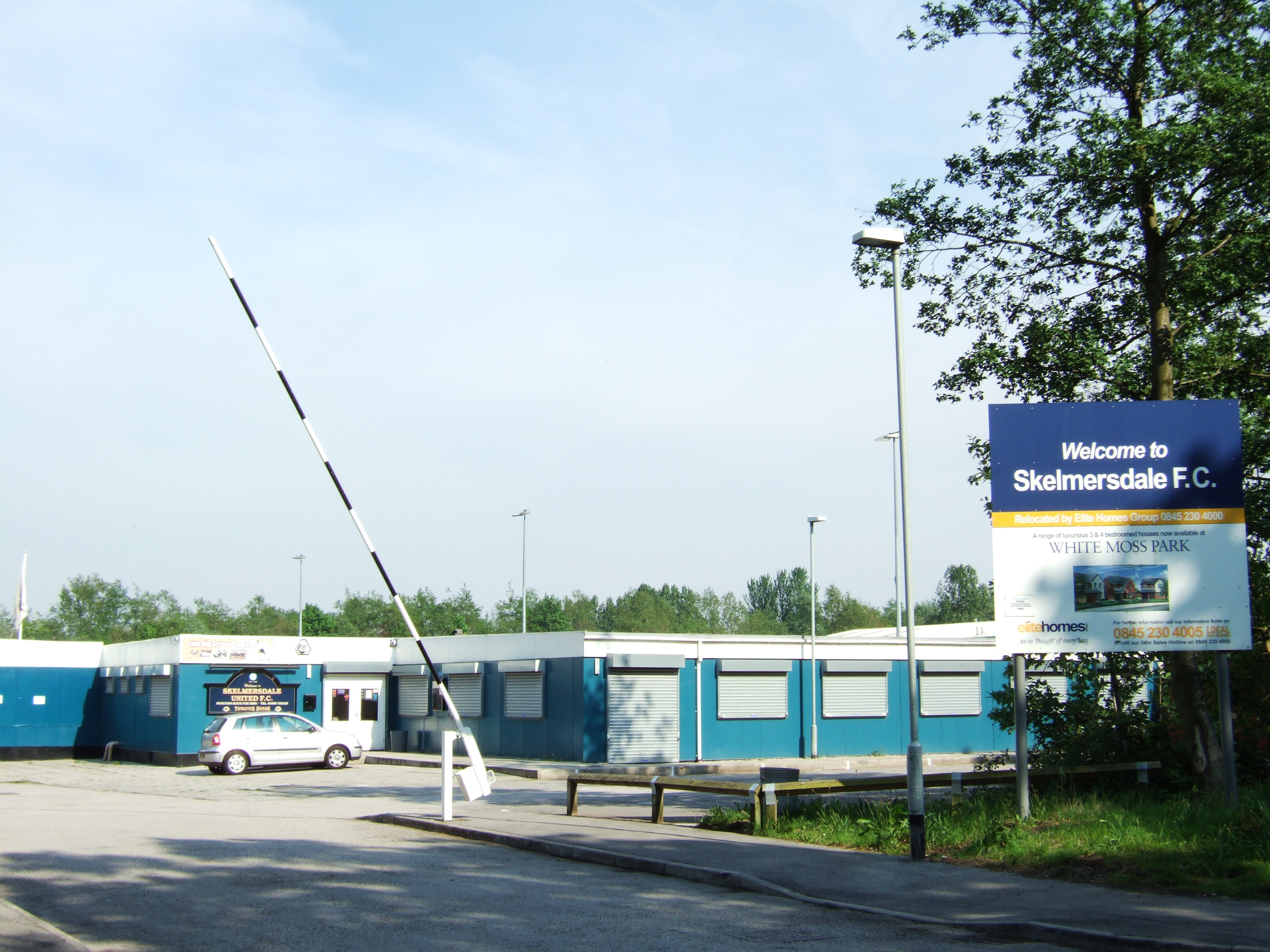
Stormy Corner, home of Skelmersdale United from 2004 until 2016 when land owner Martin Gilchrist locked the gates to the ground and left Skelmersdale United temporarily homeless.

Russ Perkins was named as manager and the club quickly regained promotion and the start of the long road back to the club's former glory. Winning the League Challenge Trophy in May 2000, the club left their spiritual home of White Moss Park in 2002 and eventually moved to the newly named Westgate Interactive Stadium (also known as Stormy Corner) in 2004. Stuart Rudd broke the goal-scoring record, netting 230 goals. With Paul Gallagher in charge, the club moved forward, securing a second-place finish and promotion to the Northern Premier League in 2006.

=== Northern Premier league ===
Following several years on the management committee, Frank Hughes was appointed as the new Chairman, as Arthur Gore stepped to one side. Frank swiftly appointed the experienced manager, Tommy Lawson, to take the club to a new level, and apart from a mid-table position in 2006–07, the club finished in a play-off position in the next 5 seasons. In 2008, Skelmersdale United finished third in the inaugural season of the Northern Premier League Division One North. They were only 4 points off the top spot and won the semi-final of the playoffs against Curzon Ashton 3–1. The final was a 4–1 loss against FC United of Manchester, despite scoring first in front of 4,000 fans at Gigg Lane. The 2009 season saw Skelmersdale finish 2nd by 1 point and lose in the semi-finals of the playoffs to Newcastle Blue Star 1–0. Both teams that were promoted that season went into administration in the off-season. The 2010 season saw Skelmersdale finish in 5th place and lose in the semi-final of the playoffs 2–0 to Lancaster City.

In the 2011 season, Skelmersdale again finished in 2nd place to Chester. Skelmersdale were 3 points behind and had a worse goal difference, but having scored significantly more goals than Chester. The final day of fixtures saw Skelmersdale needing to win and Chester to lose, with an 8-goal swing in Skelmersdale's favour. Chester did, in fact, lose to mid-table Garforth Town by a 2–1 score line, but Skelmersdale only won their game 7–2 against bottom team Ossett Town, so missed out on promotion by 2 goals. Their misery was completed by losing in the semi-finals yet again to AFC Fylde 1–0. At the end of the season, Frank Hughes stepped down as chairman, citing personal reasons, with Paul Griffiths stepping up from vice chairman. The 2012 season saw Skelmersdale finish outside the playoffs for the first time in 7th place.

Skelmersdale continued to improve under manager Tommy Lawson. In the 2012–2013 season, they finished top of the league, being promoted to the Northern Premier League Premier Division which sits under the Conference (now National League) and is level 7 in the National League system. They won it by a 16-point margin from second place, scoring 110 goals in the league alone that season. This is their highest position in non-league football 'pyramid' to date.

On 5 March 2011, Skelmersdale entertained Chester in a Northern Premier League Division One North fixture and broke the attendance record for The Skelmersdale & Ormskirk College Stadium when 1,171 attended, it had previously been 1,002 for an FA Cup tie in 2004 against Burscough. Despite challenging for the title in their first season in the NPL Premier the club lost ground and eventually finished 6th. After a good start to the 2014–15 season, the club led the table until after the Christmas period, but United found themselves in a serious financial problem and only through the efforts of the players, supporters, and sponsors the club managed to see the season through. The season, however, ended on a high as victories over Champions FC United and a Liverpool Senior Cup win offered the club optimism for the future.

The 2015–16 season saw United finish 16th; the highlights of the season would come in the cup competitions, firstly the run to the FA Trophy first round where they exited at the hands of AFC Fylde. Losing 4–0 at the AJ Bell Stadium in January 2016 after weather had forced several postponements of United's hosting of the replay after drawing 4–4 in the original tie. The run included a 5–2 win over Chorley FC in the previous round, and United also reached the semi-finals of the Liverpool Senior Cup, where a 4–0 loss to eventual winners Everton U23s saw them end their defense of the trophy.

2016–17 was notable for the events of late March 2017, as Skelmersdale suffered relegation to Northern Premier League Division One North which was confirmed by a 6–0 home defeat to Buxton FC on 25 March. On 28 March 2017, the club announced that it had been unable to agree on a new lease on its Uretek Stadium ground and, as a result, was at risk of ceasing to exist. However, on 1 April, the club announced an agreement with nearby Prescot Cables F.C. to ground share for the 2017/18 season, safeguarding the club's future in the short term.

Exits at the first stage of the cup competitions, coupled with an exodus of the playing staff over the festive period after a cut in the playing budget, then led to a change in the backroom in January 2017 with long serving manager Tommy Lawson sacked. Alan Rogers took charge in February and, working with a youthful squad, was unable to prevent the drop to the division below.

Ahead of their first season in Northern Premier League Division One North since 2013, United brought in experienced players Danny Ventre, Richard Brodie, Andy Owens, Steven Gillespie and Gareth Roberts to bolster a young squad. A mixed start to the 2017–18 season saw one win in the opening nine league games with an exit in the First Qualifying round of the FA Cup. Rogers departed as manager on 20 September, citing other work commitments, and Dave Powell was appointed manager on 24 September. Under Powell, United exited the FA Trophy, Integro League Cup and Liverpool Senior Cup at the hands of Mossley, Atherton Collieries and Burscough respectively. A defeat to Kendal Town in the League was followed by a five-game unbeaten run which included a first away win of the season at Tadcaster Albion and home victories over Ramsbottom United, Mossley and Ossett Town. The club was evicted from the Uretek stadium on 20 October but agreed a temporary ground-share with Marine before beginning a season-long ground-share at Prescot Cables' Valerie Park Park on 18 November. The club finished 21st in the 2017–18 season, avoiding relegation.

The 2018–19 season saw the club play in the newly formed Evo-Stik West Division. One win in the opening 14 games saw a change in management with Dave Powell departing on 11 November and Paul McNally appointed as manager on 16 November. Having won only 13 points in their campaign, United were relegated from the Northern Premier League in 20th position to join the North West Counties Football League following a 5–0 loss to Prescot Cables who continued as landlords to United into the next season.

=== North West Counties League, plus a single NPL season ===
Skelmersdale United moved to their new home of the JMO Sports Park after a mixed start to the 2019–20 North West Counties Football League season and played their first game at the venue on Boxing Day 2019 against local rivals Burscough with United coming out on top with a 4–0 win in front of 266 supporters. That was the first of a winning trilogy at JMO before a number of the high-flying sides visited with close run battles before the season was ended early by the FA due to the COVID-19 pandemic. United reached the first round of the 2020–21 FA Cup for the first time since their 1971 loss to Tranmere and were beaten 4–1 by Harrogate Town. They began the competition in the extra preliminary round, beating six teams in order to reach the first round of the Cup.

In the 2021–22 season, Skelmersdale United achieved promotion back to the NPL Division One West after finishing second to Macclesfield and playing a one-off playoff game, 150 miles away against Cinderford Town. Michael Howard scoring four goals in a 5–1 win that saw Paul McNally's team promoted back to the NPL West, with Howard getting the golden boot as the division's top scorer with 33 goals.

For ground grading reasons Skem agreed a groundshare with Burscough for the 2022–23 season to play all their home games there (an arrangement that continued for the next three seasons). Despite finishing 11th in the 2022–2023 season under manager Richard Brodie, Skelmersdale United were demoted from the Northern Premier League Division One West due to ground grading issues. Brodie left the club in May 2023 to take up the reins at local rivals Burscough.

With the club facing the possibility of going out of business, Frank Hughes returned to the club for his second stint as chairman, and appointed Matt Potter as manager.

In October 2023, former Premier League defender Pascal Chimbonda was named as manager of Skelmersdale United, replacing Matt Potter. With the lowest budget in the league, it was unsurprising that things did not work out and the club were immediately relegated in their first season back in the ninth tier. Pascal was sacked on 4 May 2024.

On 11 June 2024 the club announced the return of Tommy Lawson as manager. The 2024–25 season saw another relegation with the club only getting two league wins, due to the lack of recources and no budget available for the club. The club was relegated to the 11th tier, which means it would play at Step 7, the highest level of amateur football in the Liverpool County Premier League.

=== Liverpool County Premier League ===
For the 2025–26 season, it was announced that Skem had agreed a groundshare with Marine. During pre-season, on 20 of July, Tommy Lawson stepped down as manager. On 22 of July, it was announced that Nick Matthews would be the new manager. Matthews had previously assisted manager Chimbonda on a temporary basis when he was at the club, but lasted just four league games before being sacked by the club on 16 September 2025. He was immediately replaced by former Skem player Andy Barlow, who’d previously served as assistant to both Tommy & Nick.

== Records ==
- Best FA Cup performance: First round, 2020–21
- Best FA Trophy performance: Third round, 2012–13
- Best FA Vase performance: Fourth round, 1990–00, 2004–05
- Best FA Amateur Cup performance: Champions: 1970–71

== Former players ==
Players who left the club directly for league clubs include:

- (England) Micky Burns – Blackpool & Newcastle United (1971–76)
- Steve Heighway – Liverpool. The story that Steve gained an International Cap with the Republic of Ireland whilst he was still playing for Skelmersdale is a myth as Steve left United in April 1970 and gained his first cap 23 September 1970
- (India) Matthew Dreha – Liverpool
- (England) Sean McConville – Accrington Stanley January 2009
- (England) Josh Lennie (2009)
- (England) Matty Hughes – Fleetwood Town
- (England) Ben Tollitt – Portsmouth

Those who played for the club and progressed into league football after leaving the club include:

- (England) Paul Futcher – Chester City & Manchester City
- (England) Ron Futcher – Chester City & Manchester City
- (England) Craig Noone – Plymouth Argyle, Exeter City (Loan) and Brighton & Hove Albion
- (England) Peter Withe – Nottingham Forest & Aston Villa
- (England) Gerry Keenan – Port Vale

Those who played for the club after a career in league football include:

- (France) Pascal Chimbonda
