= Cheadle Town F.C. =

Association football club in Greater Manchester, England

Coordinates: 53°23′31.69″N 2°12′12.18″W

Cheadle Town
- Full name: Cheadle Town Football Club
- Founded: 1961 (as Grasmere Rovers)
- Ground: Park Road Stadium
- Capacity: 1,200
- Chairman: George Turner
- Player-Manager: Paul Turnbull
- League: Midland League Premier Division
- 2025–26: North West Counties League Premier Division, 18th of 24 (transferred)
- Website: cheadletown.co.uk
Home colours	Away colours

Cheadle Town Football Club are a semi-professional football club based in Cheadle, a suburb of Stockport, Greater Manchester, England. They were established in 1961 and joined the North West Counties Football League in 1983. They are currently members of the Midland League Premier Division (the new name of the "old" Division One as of 2008–09). Their home ground is Park Road Stadium.

== History ==
=== As Grasmere Rovers ===
Cheadle Town's history can be traced back to 1961 when a 14-year-old boy called Barrie Dean asked his neighbour, Chris Davies, to help his friends form a football team. This team was called Grasmere Rovers after the name of the street that both Dean and Davies lived on (Grasmere Avenue). Chris Davies took on the role of team manager and on 3 September 1961, Grasmere Rovers took to the field for the first time, losing 0–5 to Sutton Boys.

Grasmere started out in the Manchester Junior Football League - a league they would eventually win in the 1967–68 season - playing their games on a Sunday afternoon at The Mellands Playing Fields in Belle Vue. They joined the Manchester League in 1972, allowing them to play their football on the more regular Saturday afternoon. Now under the managerial guidance of Albert Pike, with Chris Davies as chairman and now playing their matches at Surrey Street in Glossop, Grasmere Rovers went from strength-to-strength; the peak of which was the 1979–80 season where they won the Manchester League, the Gilchrist Cup, the Manchester County Amateur Cup and the Derbyshire Junior Cup. In that same season striker Peter Tilley ran in 43 goals.

The team moved to their present-day home of Park Road for the 1982–83 season. Al Sadd were the first ever visitors on Saturday 12 August 1982, running out 4–1 winners on the day. This would be the last season that the team would be known as Grasmere Rovers.

=== As Cheadle Town ===
The club joined the North West Counties Football League (NWCFL) for the 1983–84 season as Cheadle Town, under the managerial guidance of Gerry Clewes. They finished their first season a lowly 15th in Division Three but were promoted "by default" at the end of the 1986–87 season when Division Three was incorporated into Division Two.

Cheadle Town have spent most of their NWCFL life in Division Two; 1998 saw the start of a three-year escape from Division Two as the club were promoted to Division One. The club struggled with lowly finishes during their three seasons and were ultimately relegated back to Division Two in 2001 after finishing bottom. They stayed at this level until season 2022–23; the fact that Cheadle Town found themselves in Division One for the start of the 2008–09 season was merely down to a renaming of the NWCFL leagues.

== Club colours and badge ==
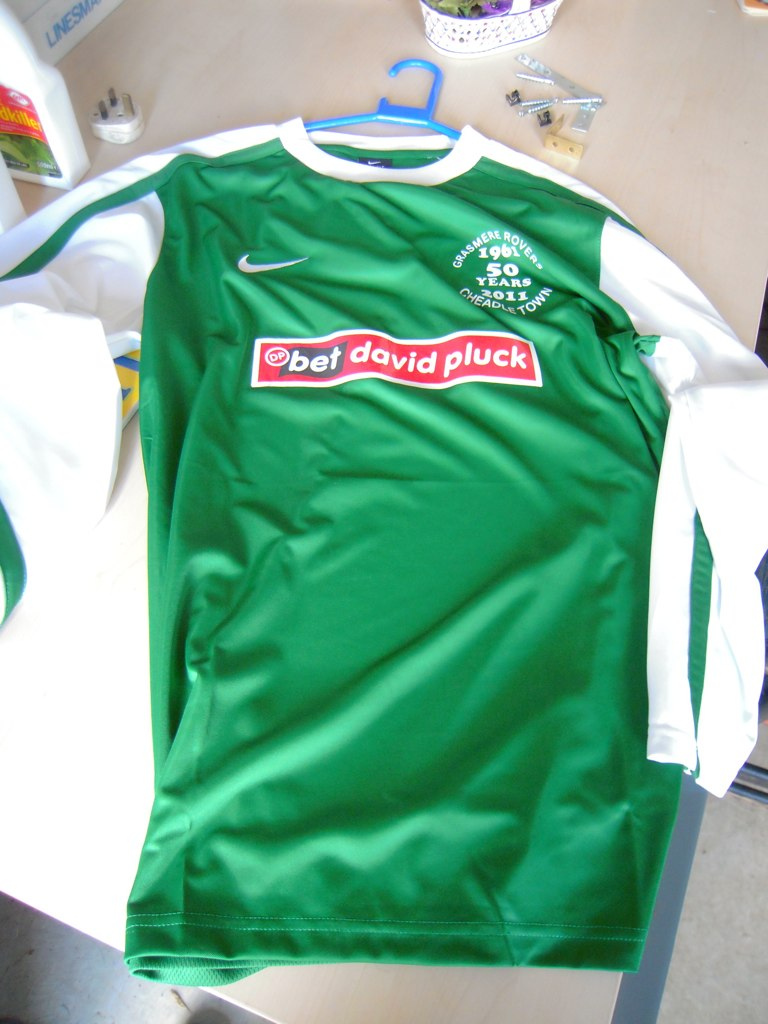
Cheadle's more traditional colours of black-and-white as seen in the 2008–09 season (left) and the green-and-white shirt introduced for the 2011–12 season, reflecting Grasmere Rovers' original colours.

Cheadle Town's most common colours were white and black worn in the combination of white shirts, black shorts and black stockings. They have also appeared in a multitude of other colour combinations such as yellow and blue, sky blue and white stripes and also all-red.

As part of the club's 50th anniversary celebrations in 2011 the club decided to revert to the original colours of Grasmere Rovers: green and white.

For the start of the 2018–19 season the club changed its colours once again to red-and-white striped shirts, red shorts and stockings.

The old club badge

The club logo was also changed for the start of the 2018–19 season.

The old badge was taken directly from the coat of arms granted to the Cheadle & Gatley Urban District Council back in December 1955.

== Stadium ==
The Ground Up Solutions Stadium (formerly Park Road Stadium) has an official capacity of 2,000; its record attendance is 1,700 for a friendly match against Stockport County in August 1994. During the 1966 World Cup it was used by the Portugal national team as a training ground and has also had the honour of hosting a soccer school run by Brazilian legend Jairzinho during the summer of 1993.

It has a covered main stand on the west side of the pitch that can seat approximately 250 and contains the changing rooms underneath; the other three sides of the pitch are uncovered and surrounded by nothing more than a railing. Other facilities at the stadium include a clubhouse and a portable building that doubles up as the refreshments kiosk and hospitality room. The ground also includes a 2nd pitch adjacent to the main pitch, which is used by the clubs reserve team and their junior teams.

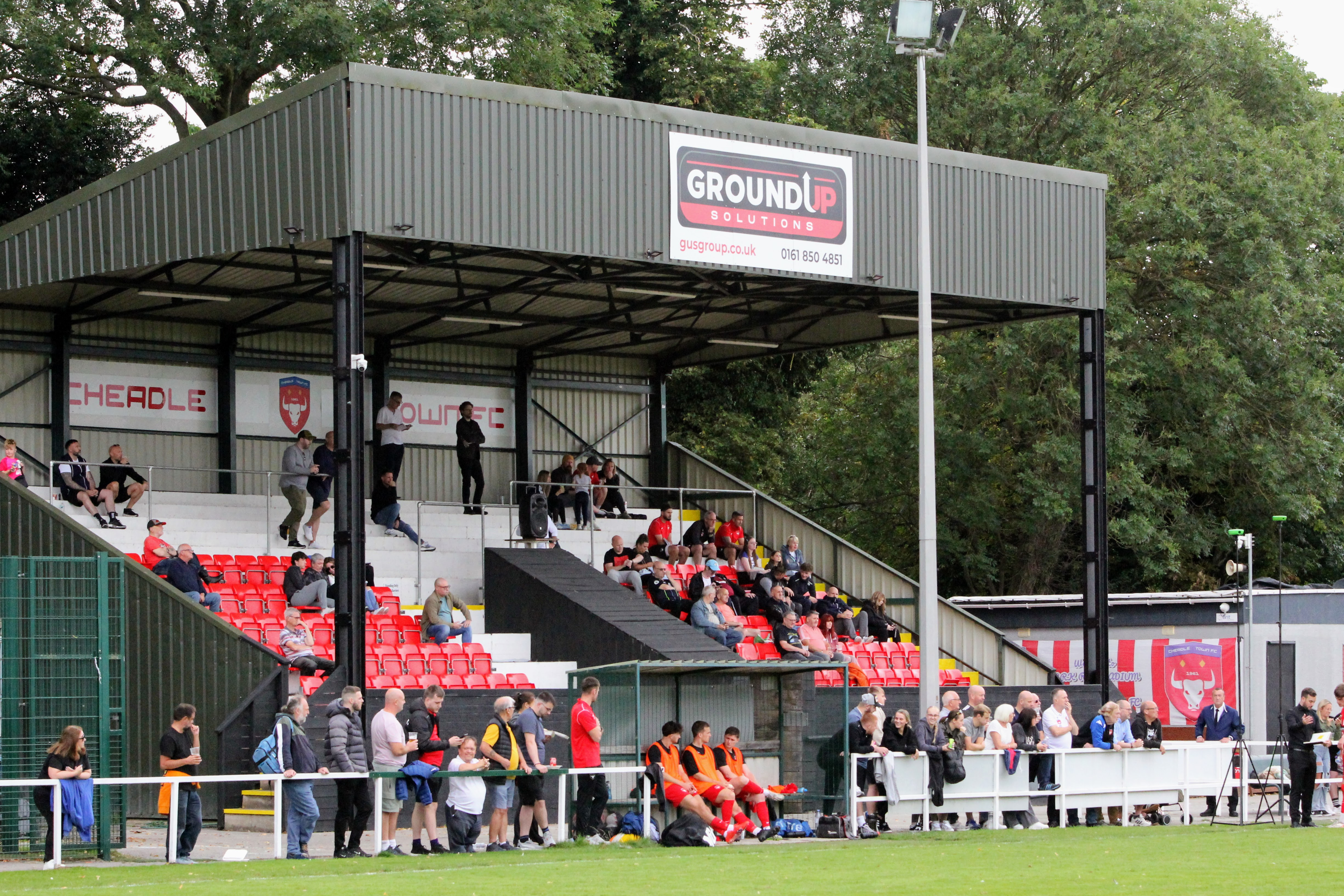
The newly branded Ground Up Solutions Stadium Main Stand ahead of season 2024–25

The view from the Main Stand, looking towards the Tennyson Road end

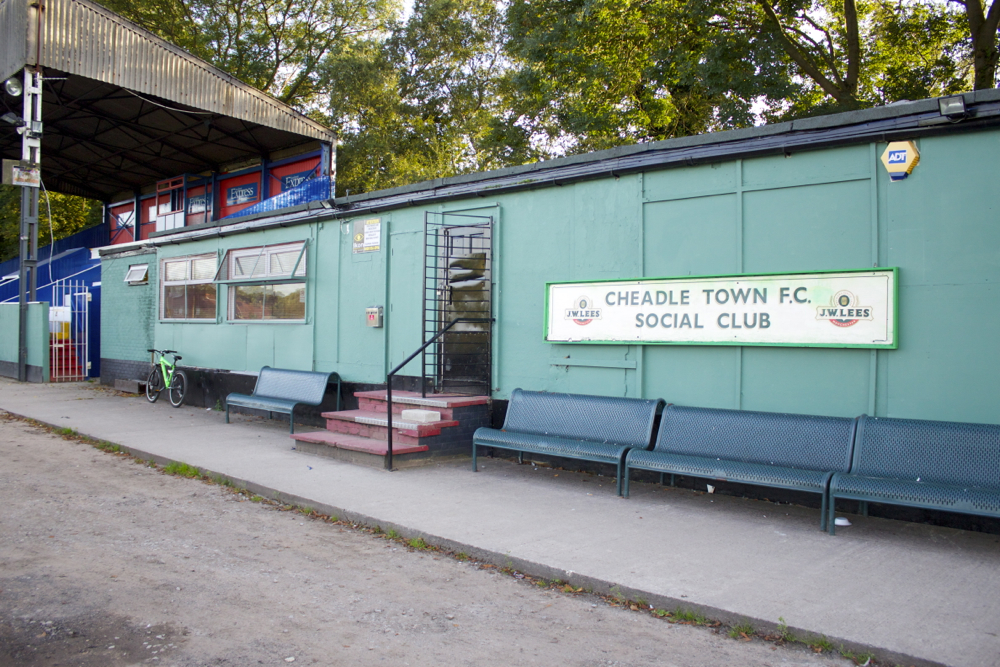
The old clubhouse, demolished in November 2014

In April 2014, the club announced that they had been awarded a £5,000 grant from Capital One as part of the company's Grounds For Improvement competition. This money was used for two new dugouts, a brand-new hard-standing surface directly from the tunnel to the dugout areas and new storage facilities. In the recent months the club has managed to install seats in its main stand and has begun rebuilding its club house after the old structure was demolished in November 2014. A new F.A standard 5 a-side pitch has also been built.

Further work on the stadium took place over the summer of 2018, thanks to the club winning a £50,000 Buildbase bursary. The clubhouse and changing rooms were refurbished and a new external cafe was opened.

== Playing squad ==
As of 28 June 2024.

Note: Flags indicate national team as defined under FIFA eligibility rules; some limited exceptions apply. Players may hold more than one non-FIFA nationality.

No.	Pos.	Nation	Player
—	GK	ENG	James Hodges
—	GK	ENG	Dimeji Willan
—	DF	ENG	Matthew Cook
—	DF	ENG	Benjamin Hampson
—	DF	ENG	Kieran O'Connell
—	DF	NGA	Oghenomare Orhenomare
—	DF	ENG	Harry Shipton
—	DF	NIR	Matthew Smyth
—	DF	ENG	Jack Taylor
—	MF	ENG	Daniel Byrnes

No.	Pos.	Nation	Player
—	MF	AUS	Rhain Davis
—	MF	ENG	Liam Delaney
—	MF	ENG	Oliver Ford
—	MF	ENG	Kyle Foley
—	MF	NIR	Darren McKnight
—	MF	ENG	Ryan Morton
—	MF	ENG	Sean Moscrop
—	MF	ENG	Charlie Mulgrew
—	FW	ENG	Daniel McLaughlin
—	FW	ENG	Connor Martin

== Players who went on to play for Football League teams ==
(club in brackets is the one joined by player after leaving Cheadle Town)

- Ashley Ward (Crewe Alexandra)
- Dean Crowe (Stoke City)
- Colin Little (Crewe Alexandra)

== Management team ==
=== Current management team ===
Paul Turnbull	(England)	Manager
Chris Rowley	(England)	Assistant Manager
Oliver Brockbank	(Hong Kong)	Physio

== Honours ==
=== As Grasmere Rovers ===
- Manchester & District Cup
  - Winners 1972–73
- Manchester League Division One
  - Winners 1979–80
  - Runners-up 1980–81, 1981–82
- Manchester County Amateur Cup
  - Winners 1979–80
- Gilchrist Cup
  - Winners 1979–80
- Derbyshire Junior Cup
  - Winners 1979–80

=== As Cheadle Town ===
- Lamot Pils Trophy
  - Runners-up 1990–91
- North West Counties Division One Trophy
  - Runners-up 1995–96, 2009–10
- Stockport DFA Cup (the club used the Reserve squad to compete in this tournament)
  - Runners-up 2009–10
  - Winners 2012–13, 2016–17

== League performances ==
Cheadle Town FC: Final League Positions
Season	League	Position	No. of teams	Notes
1983–84	North West Counties Football League - Division Three	15th	18	
1984–85	North West Counties Football League - Division Three	12th	18	
1985–86	North West Counties Football League - Division Three	7th	15	
1986–87	North West Counties Football League - Division Three	8th	13	Division 3 merged with Division 2 at end of season
1987–88	North West Counties Football League - Division Two	12th	22	
1988–89	North West Counties Football League - Division Two	14th	18	
1989–90	North West Counties Football League - Division Two	6th	16	
1990–91	North West Counties Football League - Division Two	7th	18	Lamot Pils Trophy Runners-Up
1991–92	North West Counties Football League - Division Two	9th	18	
1992–93	North West Counties Football League - Division Two	12th	18	
1993–94	North West Counties Football League - Division Two	12th	18	
1994–95	North West Counties Football League - Division Two	11th	16	
1995–96	North West Counties Football League - Division Two	6th	18	NWCFL Division 2 Trophy Runners-Up
1996–97	North West Counties Football League - Division Two	9th	20	
1997–98	North West Counties Football League - Division Two	4th	21	Promoted
1998–99	North West Counties Football League - Division One	17th	21	
1999–00	North West Counties Football League - Division One	18th	22	
2000–01	North West Counties Football League - Division One	22nd	22	Relegated
2001–02	North West Counties Football League - Division Two	17th	21	
2002–03	North West Counties Football League - Division Two	13th	19	
2003–04	North West Counties Football League - Division Two	16th	20	
2004–05	North West Counties Football League - Division Two	12th	19	
2005–06	North West Counties Football League - Division Two	14th	19	
2006–07	North West Counties Football League - Division Two	12th	18	
2007–08	North West Counties Football League - Division Two	14th	18	
2008–09	North West Counties Football League - Division One	7th	18	Division 2 renamed to Division 1
2009–10	North West Counties Football League - Division One	14th	17	NWCFL Division 1 Trophy Runners-Up
2010–11	North West Counties Football League - Division One	10th	18	
2011–12	North West Counties Football League - Division One	8th	18	
2012–13	North West Counties Football League - Division One	7th	18	Stockport DFA Cup Winners
2013–14	North West Counties Football League - Division One	11th	19	
2014–15	North West Counties Football League - Division One	10th	19	
2015–16	North West Counties Football League - Division One	6th	18	
2016–17	North West Counties Football League - Division One	12th	22	Stockport DFA Cup Winners
2017–18	North West Counties Football League - Division One	12th	22	
2018–19	North West Counties Football League - Division One South	16th	22	
2019–20	North West Counties Football League - Division One South	8th	20	Season marked null and void due to COVID-19
2020–21	North West Counties Football League - Division One South	11th	20	Season marked null and void due to COVID-19
2021–22	North West Counties Football League - Division One South	7th	20	
2022–23	North West Counties Football League - Division One South	5th	20	Promoted via Play-Offs
2023–24	North West Counties Football League - Premier Division	15th	24	

== Records ==
- Best FA Cup performance: Second Qualifying Round 2007–08 (vs. Dinnington Town F.C.)
- Best FA Vase performance: Third Round 1983–84 (vs. Hucknall Colliery Welfare F.C.) and 2022–23 (vs. A.F.C. Liverpool)
- Record attendance: 3,227 (vs. F.C. United of Manchester) North West Counties League Second Division, 26 November 2005

== Foreign tours ==
Cheadle Town are famous throughout non-League football for their foreign tours. When abroad, the club travels under the name of AFC Manchester and have clocked up over 200,000 airmiles, 96 games in 30 different countries, a total aggregate crowd of 312,000 and 111 goals. Opponents have included seven national teams, with the club being the first and only English outfit to play in and against Cuba (in 1975) – a match that was shown on Cuban national television. They also played at the Azteca Stadium in Mexico City, watched by a crowd of 65,000 and met people such as Alfredo Di Stéfano, Ronnie Biggs and Rajiv Gandhi.

In 1991, the team traveled to Rio de Janeiro in Brazil to play against Bangu. Cheadle Town expected to play against Bangu under-19, and the club from Rio de Janeiro believed that the opponent were Manchester United. Bangu defeated Cheadle Town 18–0.

In October 2014, the club played host to the Russian under-19 team as a warm-up for the Russians prior to their game against Northern Ireland. Cheadle lost 0–22.

== Link with FC Sports ==
In December 2017, Cheadle Town F.C. became part of the Little Sports Group. The Little Sports Group founded FC Sports in 2009, consisting of junior football teams from U4s to U16s. In 2013, FC Sports was awarded 'Charter Standard' status by The FA, this kitemark recognises the standards of facilities, coaching, policies and procedures.
