= List of Gretna F.C. seasons =

This is a list of Gretna Football Club seasons from 1987 to 1988, when Gretna played in the English Northern League, to 2007–08, when the club was liquidated and resigned its membership of the Scottish Football League. The list details Gretna's record in major league and cup competitions, and the club's top league goal scorer of each season where available. Top scorers in bold were also the top scorers in Gretna's division that season. Records of local competitions are not included.

The club was founded in 1946. Gretna played in the English Northern League until it was elected to the Scottish Football League, replacing the defunct Airdrieonians in 2002. Gretna rapidly rose through the Scottish leagues in the mid-2000s, as benefactor Brooks Mileson provided funding for professional players. After Mileson withdrew his funding, the club entered administration during the 2007–08 season. After the administrator failed to find a buyer for the club, the club resigned from its membership of the Scottish Football League. The club was subsequently liquidated, with its fans forming the new club Gretna F.C. 2008.

== Seasons ==
=== English football ===
Season	League									FA Cup	FA Trophy	Challenge Cup
Season	Division	P	W	D	L	F	A	Pts	Pos	FA Cup	FA Trophy	Challenge Cup
1982–83	NFL 2	30	18	6	6	63	29	60	2nd			
1983–84	NFL 1	38	15	7	12	65	58	49	8th	QR2		
1984–85	NFL 1	38	17	8	9	56	39	59	6th	QR3	R2	
1985–86	NFL 1	38	13	11	14	70	69	50	11th	QR3	QR3	
1986–87	NFL 1	38	17	10	11	73	57	61	7th	QR4	QR1	
1987–88	NFL 1	38	17	6	15	69	46	57	7th	QR2	QR1	
1988–89	NFL 1	38	23	6	9	79	44	75	3rd	QR2	R2	
1989–90	NFL 1	38	23	6	9	79	44	75	2nd	QR1	R1	
1990–91	NFL 1	38	30	5	3	86	23	95	1st	QR3	R2	
1991–92	NFL 1	38	25	10	3	81	33	85	1st	R1	R1	
1992–93	NPL 1	40	17	12	11	64	47	63	6th	QR1	R1	?
1993–94	NPL 1	40	16	7	17	64	65	55	10th	R1	R2	?
1994–95	NPL 1	42	14	13	15	64	66	55	11th	QR1	R1	?
1995–96	NPL 1	40	13	13	14	75	65	52	12th	PR	QR3	?
1996–97	NPL 1	42	11	17	14	55	67	50	16th	QR1	QR1	R2
1997–98	NPL 1	42	13	9	20	58	64	48	15th	QR3	QR1	R1
1998–99	NPL 1	42	16	10	16	73	80	58	12th	QR1	R2	R1
1999–2000	NPL 1	42	11	7	24	48	78	40	19th	QR2	R2	First Group Stage
2000–01	NPL 1	42	12	12	18	72	82	48	16th	PR	R2	Group Stage
2001–02	NPL 1	42	19	7	16	66	6	63	7th	QR2	R2	Group Stage

=== Scottish football ===
Season	League									Scottish Cup	League Cup	Challenge Cup	Other	Top league goalscorer	
Season	Division	P	W	D	L	F	A	Pts	Pos	Scottish Cup	League Cup	Challenge Cup	Other	Name	Goals
2002–03	SFL 3	36	11	12	13	50	50	45	6th	R3	R1	R1	N/A	Dobie	10
2003–04	SFL 3	36	20	8	8	59	39	68	3rd	R3	R1	R1	N/A	Cameron	17
2004–05	SFL 3	36	32	2	2	130	29	98	1st	R3	R1	QF	N/A	**Deuchar**	**38**
2005–06	SFL 2	36	28	4	4	97	30	88	1st	Final	R2	R1	N/A	**Deuchar**	**18**
2006–07	SFL 1	36	19	9	8	70	40	66	1st	R4	R3	QF	UEFA Cup – QR2	**McMenamin**	**24**
2007–08	SPL	38	5	8	25	32	83	13	12th	R4	R3	N/A	N/A	Deuchar	6

== Key ==
Champions	Runners-up	Promoted	Relegated

- P = Played
- W = Games won
- D = Games drawn
- L = Games lost
- F = Goals for
- A = Goals against
- Pts = Points
- Pos = Final position
- R1 = Round 1
- R2 = Round 2
- R3 = Round 3
- R4 = Round 4
- QF = Quarter-finals
- SF = Semi-finals
- F = Final
- NPL 1 = Northern Premier League First Division
- NFL 1 = Northern Football League First Division
- SPL = Scottish Premier League
- SFL 1 = Scottish First Division
- SFL 2 = Scottish Second Division
- SFL 3 = Scottish Third Division
