= Gretna F.C. =

Scottish football club, 1946-2008

Gretna
- Full name: Gretna Football Club
- Nicknames: Black and Whites; Anvils
- Founded: 1946; 80 years ago
- Dissolved: 2008; 18 years ago
- Ground: Raydale Park
- Capacity: 3,000
- 2007–08: Scottish Premier League, 12th (relegated)
| Home colours | Away colours |

Gretna Football Club was a Scottish professional football club based in the town of Gretna, Dumfries and Galloway, close to the border between England and Scotland, that last competed in the Scottish Premier League, the then top flight of Scottish football. Nicknamed the Black and Whites or the Anvils, the club was founded in 1946, and enjoyed rapid and continual success in the mid-2000s, reaching the Scottish Cup Final in 2006. However, the club fell into severe financial difficulties when its main financial backer, businessman Brooks Mileson, withdrew funds due to ill health, leading the club to dissolve in 2008.

Despite being based in Scotland, the club participated in amateur and semi-professional leagues in English football from 1947 until they were elected to the Scottish Football League at the third attempt in 2002. Relying heavily on substantial financial support from Mileson, the club were promoted through the Scottish leagues from the Third Division to the Scottish Premier League in less than five years. The club also reached the 2006 Scottish Cup Final, losing in a penalty shoot-out to Hearts.

Gretna struggled badly in the SPL and the club were placed in administration after Mileson withdrew his support due to illness. At the end of the season, all of the club's staff were made redundant and the club were initially relegated to the Third Division due to their inability to guarantee fulfilment of their forthcoming fixtures. After this demotion, the one remaining offer to buy the club was withdrawn. The club resigned their place in the Scottish Football League on 3 June 2008 and were formally liquidated on 8 August.

The club's supporters' trust then decided to establish a new club, Gretna 2008, who were accepted into the East of Scotland Football League on 11 July 2008. Whilst sharing the same fanbase and a similar name, the new club has no legal connection with the original Gretna Football Club.

== History ==
=== Formation ===
An amateur club called Gretna Green had existed in the town in the 19th century, but were bankrupt by the 1920s. This left the area without a team until Gretna Football Club was founded in 1946 by local workers and servicemen returning from the Second World War. Former professional footballer James Kerr was one of the club's founders and as part of the club's committee, his opinion held sway when picking the team. The club initially played in the Dumfries and District Junior League.

=== Period in English football ===
The following year, the club moved to the Carlisle and District League. This was despite the club being based in Scotland, albeit very close to the Anglo-Scottish border. They remained in this league for all but one season until 1982, when the club moved to the newly created Second Division of the Northern League. The club won this league and were promoted immediately, before back-to-back championship wins in the First Division, in 1990–91 and 1991–92, resulted in their promotion to the first division of the Northern Premier League.

During this period, the club featured in the FA Cup, becoming the first club based in Scotland to appear in the competition proper since Queens Park in 1887. They managed to take Rochdale to a replay in 1991 and gave Bolton Wanderers a scare in 1993 before being beaten.

The club saw its future in Scottish football and applied twice to join the Scottish League in 1993 and 1999. To help boost their later application, they played a Rangers XI in a game to raise money for victims of the Lockerbie bombing. Gretna won 2–1 against a strong team.

=== Period back in Scottish football ===
==== Rapid rise through the leagues ====
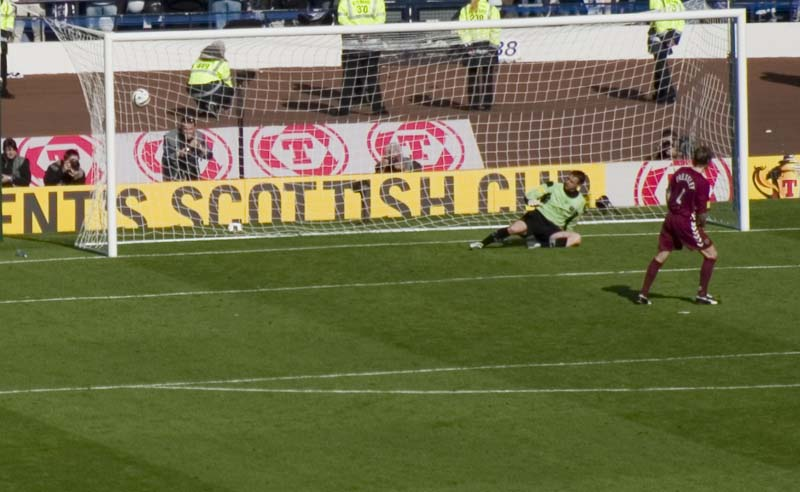
Steven Pressley scores past Gretna goalkeeper Alan Main in the 2006 Scottish Cup Final penalty shoot-out

In 2002, Gretna were elected to the Scottish Football League at the third attempt, taking the place of Airdrieonians. The club was soon taken over by Brooks Mileson and with his financial input Gretna's on-field fortunes improved. Gretna won the Division Three, Division Two and Division One titles in successive seasons from 2005 to 2007. During their seasons of successive promotions they scored 297 goals, 130 in the 2004–05 season alone.

Gretna were also runners-up in the 2006 Scottish Cup. Gretna's 3–0 win in the semi-final against Dundee made them the first team from the third tier of Scottish league football to reach the final. Gretna lost to Heart of Midlothian in the final on penalties after a 1–1 draw. As Hearts had finished second in the Scottish Premier League and had therefore qualified for the UEFA Champions League, Gretna became the first team from the third tier of the Scottish league to qualify for the UEFA Cup. Gretna faced League of Ireland side Derry City in the second qualifying round, but lost 7–3 on aggregate, losing the first leg 5–1 at Fir Park, Motherwell (Raydale Park was deemed unsuitable for European football).

Gretna had also been promoted to the First Division in 2006, and for much of the 2006–07 season, they led the division, with a margin of 12 points at one stage. Manager Rowan Alexander was forced to step down in March 2007 due to unspecified health problems, though he later claimed that he had had no medical issues and had been asked to take time away by the club chairman. Coach Davie Irons stepped up to the manager's position and Gretna's form dipped; second-placed St Johnstone went on a good run, leaving Gretna with only a one-point lead going into the final day of the season. Gretna beat Ross County 3–2 with a last-minute goal by James Grady, ensuring promotion to the Scottish Premier League.

==== Gretna in the Scottish Premier League ====
During the 2007–08 season, Gretna had to play all their home games at Motherwell's home ground of Fir Park because Raydale Park did not meet SPL standards. Their first game in the SPL was against Falkirk which ended in a 4–0 defeat for Gretna. They continued to struggle, only gaining four points in their first 12 games and having to wait until 22 September 2007 for their first win in the SPL, defeating Dundee United 3–2 at Fir Park.

Far worse news was that during this time the club's financial situation became dire. The club had accumulated debts of nearly £4m, and owner Brooks Mileson fell ill and withdrew his financial support for the club (Mileson never fully recovered from his health problems and died on 3 November 2008). A confused management situation did not help. Whilst Rowan Alexander was officially still manager, Davie Irons was in control of the team. On 6 November 2007, Gretna officially sacked Alexander as manager and formally installed Irons in his position.

On 18 February 2008 it was revealed that Gretna staff, including players, had not received their wages on time. Irons and assistant manager Derek Collins both resigned from their posts the following day. Gretna director of football Mick Wadsworth, assisted by Iain Scott and Andy Smith, took charge of first-team affairs. The club went into administration on 12 March 2008 after Mileson's withdrawal of support. Under SPL regulations, this resulted in an automatic ten point deduction, meaning they had a total of only six points from 28 games on the date of entering administration. The SPL agreed to pay the players' wages until the end of the 2007–08 season, ensuring that the club were able to complete its fixtures in the SPL.

Administration led to cost-cutting and redundancies; club captain Chris Innes was made redundant on 25 March 2008, with the club explaining that he had "attracted interest from other clubs". The following day, 22 players, including eight members of the senior squad, along with coaching staff and the former owner's son were also made redundant. Gretna were mathematically relegated from the SPL on 29 March 2008 after being defeated 2–0 by St Mirren at Love Street, and broke the SPL's low attendance record on 5 April 2008 in their game against Inverness, when just 431 turned up for the match. They won their final SPL game, a home match against Hearts 1–0 with a goal from Gavin Skelton, which meant they finished the season with 13 points, narrowly avoiding setting a record low points total for the Scottish top-flight. Even without the point deduction, Gretna would have still been relegated by a 17-point margin behind Kilmarnock.

=== Liquidation ===
In early 2008 it was revealed by the administrator, Wilson Field of Sheffield, that Gretna had creditors of nearly £4m and assets (Raydale Park) of £812,000. HM Revenue and Customs was owed nearly £600,000 in total, and it was their threat to wind up the company that precipitated Gretna's move into administration. On 8 May, the administrator set a deadline of 17 May for a buyer to be found, or the club would be liquidated.

After that deadline passed without a buyer making a firm offer, all the remaining employees were made redundant, but it was reported that the club were still negotiating with an interested buyer. On 29 May, Gretna were relegated to the Third Division due to their financial struggles, with the Scottish Football League threatening expulsion should a takeover not be completed within a week. After a takeover bid fell through on 1 June, the administrators confirmed the following day that they would look to sell Raydale Park to someone who will use the site for something other than football.

Gretna resigned from the Scottish Football League on 3 June. Near neighbours Annan Athletic won the vote to replace Gretna in the Scottish league. With no ground, staff, players or a competition to play in, the club's dissolution was inevitable and the club was formally liquidated by the administrators on 8 August.

==== Successor club ====
The Gretna Supporters Society, (a Supporters' trust) formed a new club, Gretna 2008 on 2 July 2008 and applied to join both the East of Scotland Football League and the South of Scotland Football League. They were accepted into the East of Scotland League, though they initially played their matches at the Everholm Stadium in Annan. The club returned to Raydale Park in May 2009 which it now leases from the Raydale Partnership, a community group of which Gretna Supporters Society is a member.

== Seasons ==
This is a list of seasons from the 1987–88 season from their time in England's Northern Football League and later the Northern Premier League and from 2002 to 2003, when the club was admitted to the Scottish Football League to 2007–08, when the club resigned its membership from the league and was liquidated following financial difficulties. The list details Gretna's record in major league and cup competitions, and the club's top league goal scorer of each season where available. Top scorers in bold were also the top scorers in Gretna's division that season. Records of minor competitions are not included.

Key
- NE = Not Eligible
- PR = Preliminary round
- QR1 = First qualifying round
- QR2 = Second qualifying round
- QR3 = Third qualifying round
- R1 = Round 1
- R2 = Round 2
- R3 = Round 3
- R4 = Round 4
- QF = Quarter-finals
- SPL = Scottish Premier League
- SFL 1 = Scottish First Division
- SFL 2 = Scottish Second Division
- SFL 3 = Scottish Third Division
- NPL 1 = Northern Premier League First Division
- NFL 1 = Northern Football League First Division

| Champions | Runners-up | Promoted | Relegated |

| Season | League | | | | | | | | | FA Cup | FA Trophy | Challenge Cup |
| Season | Division | P | W | D | L | F | A | Pts | Pos | FA Cup | FA Trophy | Challenge Cup |
|---|---|---|---|---|---|---|---|---|---|---|---|---|
| 1987–88 | NFL 1 | 38 | 17 | 6 | 15 | 69 | 46 | 57 | 7th | QR2 | QR1 | |
| 1988–89 | NFL 1 | 38 | 23 | 6 | 9 | 79 | 44 | 75 | 3rd | QR2 | R2 | |
| 1989–90 | NFL 1 | 38 | 23 | 6 | 9 | 79 | 44 | 75 | 2nd | QR1 | R1 | |
| 1990–91 | NFL 1 | 38 | 30 | 5 | 3 | 86 | 23 | 95 | 1st | QR3 | R2 | |
| 1991–92 | NFL 1 | 38 | 25 | 10 | 3 | 81 | 33 | 85 | 1st | R1 | R1 | |
| 1992–93 | NPL 1 | 40 | 17 | 12 | 11 | 64 | 47 | 63 | 6th | QR1 | R1 | ? |
| 1993–94 | NPL 1 | 40 | 16 | 7 | 17 | 64 | 65 | 55 | 10th | R1 | R2 | ? |
| 1994–95 | NPL 1 | 42 | 14 | 13 | 15 | 64 | 66 | 55 | 11th | QR1 | R1 | ? |
| 1995–96 | NPL 1 | 40 | 13 | 13 | 14 | 75 | 65 | 52 | 12th | PR | QR3 | ? |
| 1996–97 | NPL 1 | 42 | 11 | 17 | 14 | 55 | 67 | 50 | 16th | QR1 | QR1 | R2 |
| 1997–98 | NPL 1 | 42 | 13 | 9 | 20 | 58 | 64 | 48 | 15th | QR3 | QR1 | R1 |
| 1998–99 | NPL 1 | 42 | 16 | 10 | 16 | 73 | 80 | 58 | 12th | QR1 | R2 | R1 |
| 1999–00 | NPL 1 | 42 | 11 | 7 | 24 | 48 | 78 | 40 | 19th | QR2 | R2 | First Group Stage |
| 2000–01 | NPL 1 | 42 | 12 | 12 | 18 | 72 | 82 | 48 | 16th | PR | R2 | Group Stage |
| 2001–02 | NPL 1 | 42 | 19 | 7 | 16 | 66 | 6 | 63 | 7th | QR2 | R2 | Group Stage |

| Season | League | | | | | | | | | Scottish Cup | League Cup | Challenge Cup | Europe | | Top league goal scorer | |
| Season | Division | P | W | D | L | F | A | Pts | Pos | Scottish Cup | League Cup | Challenge Cup | Europe | | Name | Goals |
|---|---|---|---|---|---|---|---|---|---|---|---|---|---|---|---|---|
| 2002–03 | SFL 3 | 36 | 11 | 12 | 13 | 50 | 50 | 45 | 6th | R3 | R1 | R1 | | | Dobie | 10 |
| 2003–04 | SFL 3 | 36 | 20 | 8 | 8 | 59 | 39 | 68 | 3rd | R2 | R1 | R1 | | | Cameron | 17 |
| 2004–05 | SFL 3 | 36 | 32 | 2 | 2 | 130 | 29 | 98 | 1st | R3 | R1 | QF | | | **Deuchar** | **38** |
| 2005–06 | SFL 2 | 36 | 28 | 4 | 4 | 97 | 30 | 88 | 1st | Runners-up | R2 | R1 | | | **Deuchar** | **18** |
| 2006–07 | SFL 1 | 36 | 19 | 9 | 8 | 70 | 40 | 66 | 1st | R4 | R3 | QF | UEFA Cup | QR2 | **McMenamin** | **24** |
| 2007–08 | SPL | 38 | 5 | 8 | 25 | 32 | 83 | 13 | 12th | R4 | R3 | NE | | | Deuchar | 6 |

== Honours ==
=== English football ===
- Northern League Division One
  - Champions (2): 1990–91, 1991–92
  - Runners-up (1): 1989–90
- Northern League Division Two
  - Runners-up (1): 1982–83
- Cumberland Senior Cup
  - Champions (11): 1958–59, 1959–60, 1966–67, 1982–83, 1983–84, 1987–88, 1988–89, 1991–92, 1993–94, 1994–95, 1996–97
  - Runners-up (8): 1952–53, 1956–57, 1960–61, 1967–68, 1974–75, 1977–78, 1985–86, 1992–93

=== Scottish football ===
- Scottish Cup
  - Runners-Up (1): 2005–06
- Scottish Football League Division One
  - Champions (1): 2006–07
- Scottish Football League Division Two
  - Champions (1): 2005–06
- Scottish Football League Division Three
  - Champions (1): 2004–05

== Club records ==
- Best FA Cup performance: First round, 1991–92, 1993–94
- Best FA Trophy performance: Second round, 1988–89, 1993–94, 1998–99, 1999–00, 2000–01, 2001–02
- Best Scottish Cup performance: Runners-up, 2005–06
- Best Scottish League Cup performance: Third round, 2006–07, 2007–08
- Best Scottish Challenge Cup performance: Quarter-finals, 2004–05, 2006–07
- Best UEFA Europa League performance: Second qualifying round, 2006–07
- Record victory – 20–0 v. Silloth (1962)
- Record defeat – 2–9 v. Ashton United (2000)
- Most league points in a season – 98 (2004–05)
- Most league goals in a season – 38, Kenny Deuchar (2004–05)
- Most hat-tricks in a season – 6, Kenny Deuchar (2004–05)

== European record ==
Gretna qualified for a UEFA club competition on one occasion. In 2006, Gretna reached the final of the Scottish Cup whilst competing in the Scottish Second Division and were beaten by Heart of Midlothian. The winner of the Scottish Cup would normally qualify for the UEFA Cup, but because Hearts had already qualified for the UEFA Champions League through their league ranking in the Scottish Premier League, the place was passed to Gretna as runners-up. They were eliminated in the second qualifying round by Derry City, representing the Republic of Ireland, in a two-legged tie.

| Season | Competition | Round | Opponent | Home | Away | Aggregate |
|---|---|---|---|---|---|---|
| 2006–07 | UEFA Cup | Second qualifying round | Derry City | 1–5 | 2–2 | 3–7 |

== Managerial history ==
- Mike McCartney (1988–2000)
- Rowan Alexander (2000–2007)
- Davie Irons (2007–08)
- Andy Smith (2008)
- Mick Wadsworth (2008)
