= 2006–07 Gretna F.C. season =

Gretna
2006-07 season
- Chairman: Brooks Mileson
- Manager: Rowan Alexander (until March); Davie Irons (from March)
- Scottish First Division: 1st (Champions)
- Scottish Cup: Fourth round
- Scottish League Cup: Third round
- Scottish Challenge Cup: Quarter-final
- UEFA Cup: Third qualifying round

During the 2006–07 season, the Scottish football club Gretna F.C. finished at the top of the Scottish First Division with 19 wins and 9 draws out of 36 matches, and won promotion to the Scottish Premier League only 5 years after joining the SFL on the last day of the season beating Ross County 3–2 to clinch the First Division title. The team reached the quarterfinals of the Scottish Challenge Cup and the fourth round of the Scottish Cup.

== Results ==
=== Scottish First Division ===
Match Day	Date	Opponent	H/A	Score	Gretna Scorers	Attendance
1	5 August	Hamilton Academical	H	6–0		
2	12 August	Clyde	A	2–1		
3	19 August	Ross County	H	2–1		
4	27 August	Queen of the South	A	3–0		
5	9 September	Dundee	H	0–4		
6	16 September	Livingston	H	1–1		
7	23 September	Partick Thistle	A	6–0		
8	30 September	Airdrie United	H	0–2		
9	14 October	St Johnstone	A	3–3		
10	21 October	Clyde	H	3–3		
11	28 October	Hamilton Academical	A	1–3		
12	4 November	Dundee	A	3–1		
13	11 November	Queen of the South	H	5–0		
14	18 November	Livingston	A	2–1		
15	25 November	Partick Thistle	H	4–0		
16	2 December	St Johnstone	H	2–0		
17	9 December	Airdrie United	A	2–4		
18	16 December	Ross County	A	1-0		
19	23 December	Hamilton Academical	H	1–0		
20	30 December	Dundee	H	1–0		
21	2 January	Queen of the South	A	4–0		
22	13 January	Partick Thistle	A	2–2		
23	20 January	Livingston	H	4–1		
24	27 January	St Johnstone	A	1–2		
25	10 February	Airdrie United	H	0-0		
26	17 February	Ross County	H	4–1		
27	24 February	Clyde	A	0–2		
28	3 March	Queen of the South	H	0–3		
29	11 March	Dundee	A	1–0		
30	17 March	Livingston	A	1–1		
31	31 March	Partick Thistle	H	2–0		
32	4 April	Airdrie United	A	0–0		
33	7 April	St Johnstone	H	0–2		
34	14 April	Hamilton Academical	A	0–0		
35	21 April	Clyde	H	0–0		
36	28 April	Ross County	A	3–2		

=== Scottish Challenge Cup ===
Round	Date	Opponent	H/A	Score	Gretna Scorer(s)	Attendance
First round	15 August	Airdrie United	A	3–0	Deuchar 12', 76', Tosh 71'	1,093
Second round	30 August	Hamilton Academical	H	3–1	Graham 3', Townsley 42', McGuffie 51' pen.	841
Quarter–final	12 September	Ross County	A	2–3	McMenamin 73', Jenkins 77'	1,200

=== Scottish League Cup ===
Round	Date	Opponent	Report	H/A	Score	Gretna Scorer(s)	Attendance
Third round	20 September	Hibernian		A	0–6		11,075

=== Scottish Cup ===
Round	Date	Opponent	Report	H/A	Score	Gretna Scorer(s)	Attendance
Third round	6 January	Clyde		A	3–0	Graham 41', Paartalu 69', McMenamin 76'	1,378
Fourth round	3 February	Hibernian		A	1–3	Berkeley 80'	14,075

=== UEFA Cup ===
Round	Date	Opponent	Report	H/A	Score	Gretna Scorer(s)	Attendance
Third qualifying round 1st leg	10 August	(Republic of Ireland) Derry City		H	1–5	McGuffie 12'	6,040
Third qualifying round 2nd leg	24 August	(Republic of Ireland) Derry City		A	2–2 (3–7 agg.)	Graham 17', Baldacchino 77'	

== League table ==
Pos	Team	Pld	W	D	L	GF	GA	GD	Pts	Promotion, qualification or relegation
1	Gretna (C, P)	36	19	9	8	70	40	+30	66	Promotion to the Premier League
2	St Johnstone	36	19	8	9	65	42	+23	65	
3	Dundee	36	16	5	15	48	42	+6	53	
4	Hamilton Academical	36	14	11	11	46	47	−1	53	
5	Clyde	36	11	14	11	46	35	+11	47	

Source: "2006-2007 First Division - SPFL Archive". SPFL.
Rules for classification: 1) points; 2) goal difference; 3) number of goals scored.
(C) Champions; (P) Promoted
