= 2005–06 Gretna F.C. season =

Gretna
2005-06 season
- Chairman: Brooks Mileson
- Manager: Rowan Alexander
- Scottish Second Division: 1st (Champions)
- Scottish Cup: Runners-up
- Scottish League Cup: Second round
- Scottish Challenge Cup: First round

During the 2005–06 season, the Scottish football club Gretna became champions of the Scottish Second Division. The team also reached the final of the Scottish Cup, the biggest match of their history losing on penalties to Heart of Midlothian.

== Results ==
=== Scottish Second Division ===
Match Day	Date	Opponent	H/A	Score	Gretna Scorers	Attendance
1	6 August	Forfar Athletic	H	5–1		
2	13 August	Raith Rovers	A	3–1		
3	20 August	Stirling Albion	H	1–0		
4	27 August	Ayr United	H	2–2		
5	10 September	Greenock Morton	A	2–0		
6	17 September	Partick Thistle	H	2–2		
7	24 September	Alloa Athletic	A	3–0		
8	1 October	Dumbarton	H	1–0		
9	15 October	Peterhead	A	2–0		
10	22 October	Forfar Athletic	A	3–1		
11	25 October	Raith Rovers	H	5–1		
12	29 October	Greenock Morton	H	3–1		
13	5 November	Ayr United	A	3–1		
14	12 November	Partick Thistle	A	3–3		
15	26 November	Alloa Athletic	H	4–0		
16	3 December	Peterhead	H	3–1		
17	17 December	Dumbarton	A	1–0		
18	24 December	Forfar Athletic	H	1–2		
19	2 January	Ayr United	H	3–0		
20	14 January	Greenock Morton	A	2–2		
21	21 January	Partick Thistle	H	6–1		
22	28 January	Alloa Athletic	A	3–0		
23	11 February	Peterhead	A	3–1		
24	18 February	Raith Rovers	A	1–0		
25	27 February	Stirling Albion	A	5–0		
26	7 March	Dunbarton	H	3–0		
27	11 March	Greenock Morton	H	1–2		
28	18 March	Partick Thistle	A	2–0		
29	21 March	Ayr United	A	4–2		
30	25 March	Alloa Athletic	H	2–1		
31	8 April	Peterhead	H	3–1		
32	11 April	Stirling Albion	H	6–0		
33	15 April	Forfar Athletic	A	1–2		
34	18 April	Dumbarton	A	2–0		
35	22 April	Raith Rovers	H	2–1		
36	29 April	Stirling Albion	A	1–2		

=== Scottish Challenge Cup ===
Round	Date	Opponent	H/A	Score	Gretna Scorer(s)	Attendance
First round	30 July	Greenock Morton	A	2–3		2,798

=== Scottish League Cup ===
Round	Date	Opponent	H/A	Score	Gretna Scorer(s)	Attendance
Second round	23 August	Dunfermline Athletic	H	0–1		

=== Scottish Cup ===
Round	Date	Opponent	H/A	Score	Gretna Scorer(s)	Attendance
First round	19 November	Preston Athletic	A	6–2		
Second round	10 December	Cove Rangers	H	6–1		
Third round	7 January	St Johnstone	A	1–0		
Fourth round	4 February	Clyde	A	0–0		
Fourth round replay	14 February	Clyde	H	4–0	Grady 25', 70', 82', Deuchar 89'	
Quarter-final	25 February	St Mirren	H	1–0	Deuchar 73'	2,850
Semi-final	1 April	Dundee	N	3–0	Deuchar 45', McGuffie 58' pen., Smith 82' o.g.	14,179
Final	13 May	Heart of Midlothian	N	1–1 (aet, Hearts won 4–2 on penalties)	McGuffie 76'	51,232

== League Table ==
Pos	Team	Pld	W	D	L	GF	GA	GD	Pts	Promotion, qualification or relegation
1	Gretna (C, P)	36	28	4	4	97	30	+67	88	Promotion to the 2006–07 First Division and qualification for UEFA Cup second qualifying round (Note: As Heart of Midlothian, the Scottish Cup winners, qualified for the Champions League via their league position, the place in the UEFA Cup was passed to Gretna, the cup runner-up.)
2	Greenock Morton	36	21	7	8	58	33	+25	70	Qualification for the First Division Play-offs (Note: The 2nd, 3rd and 4th placed teams will be entered into a play-off with the First Division's 9th placed team. The winning team were awarded a place in the 2006–07 First Division, Stranraer were relegated and Partick Thistle were promoted.)
3	Peterhead	36	17	6	13	53	47	+6	57	Qualification for the First Division Play-offs
4	Partick Thistle (P)	36	16	9	11	57	56	+1	57	Qualification for the First Division Play-offs
5	Stirling Albion	36	15	6	15	54	63	−9	51	

Source: "2005-2006 Second Division - SPFL Archive". SPFL.
Rules for classification: 1) points; 2) goal difference; 3) number of goals scored.
(C) Champions; (P) Promoted
