= 2004–05 Gretna F.C. season =

Gretna
2004–05 season
- Chairman: Brooks Mileson
- Manager: Rowan Alexander
- Scottish Third Division: 1st (Champions)
- Scottish Cup: Third round
- Scottish League Cup: First round
- Scottish Challenge Cup: Quarter-final

During the 2004–05 season, the Scottish football club Gretna became champions of the Scottish Third Division. The team reached the quarter-final round of the Scottish Challenge Cup, and the third round of the Scottish Cup.

== Results ==
=== Scottish Third Division ===
Match Day	Date	Opponent	H/A	Score	Gretna Scorers	Attendance
1	7 August	Albion Rovers	H	6–0		
2	14 August	East Stirlingshire	A	2–1		
3	21 August	Montrose	H	1–0		
4	28 August	Queen's Park	A	2–3		
5	4 September	Cowdenbeath	H	2–1		
6	11 September	Peterhead	A	1–1		
7	18 September	East Fife	H	5–1		
8	25 September	Elgin City	H	3–0		
9	2 October	Stenhousemuir	A	3–0		
10	16 October	East Stirlingshire	H	8–1		
11	23 October	Albion Rovers	A	6–2		
12	30 October	Queen's Park	H	4–1		
13	6 November	Cowdenbeath	A	8–0		
14	13 November	Peterhead	H	2–1		
15	20 November	Albion Rovers	H	6–2		
16	27 November	East Fife	A	3–1		
17	4 December	Elgin City	A	3–1		
18	18 December	Stenhousemuir	H	3–0		
19	1 January	Montrose	A	3–2		
20	3 January	Queen's Park	A	1–1		
21	15 January	Cowdenbeath	H	2–0		
22	22 January	Peterhead	A	2–4		
23	29 January	East Fife	H	4–0		
24	5 February	Elgin City	H	2–1		
25	12 February	Stenhousemuir	H	4–1		
26	19 February	Montrose	H	4–1		
27	5 March	Cowdenbeath	A	1–0		
28	8 March	East Stirlingshire	A	4–0		
29	12 March	Queen's Park	A	4–0		
30	19 March	Peterhead	H	6–1		
31	2 April	East Fife	A	2–0		
32	9 April	Stenhousemuir	H	7–0		
33	16 April	Elgin City	A	6–2		
34	23 April	Montrose	A	4–0		
35	30 April	East Stirlingshire	H	1–0		
36	7 May	Albion Rovers	A	5–0		

=== Scottish Challenge Cup ===
Round	Date	Opponent	H/A	Score	Gretna Scorer(s)	Attendance
First round	31 July	Montrose	H	3–0		454
Second round	31 August	Cowdenbeath	H	1–0		551
Quarter-final	14 September	Falkirk	A	0–3		1,416

=== Scottish League Cup ===
Round	Date	Opponent	H/A	Score	Gretna Scorer(s)	Attendance
First round	17 August	Greenock Morton	A	0–1		

=== Scottish Cup ===
Round	Date	Opponent	H/A	Score	Gretna Scorer(s)	Attendance
Second round	11 December	Elgin City	H	3–0		
Third round	17 January	Dundee United	H	3-4		

== League table ==
Pos	Team	Pld	W	D	L	GF	GA	GD	Pts	Promotion
1	Gretna (C, P)	36	32	2	2	130	29	+101	98	Promotion to the Second Division
2	Peterhead (P)	36	23	9	4	81	38	+43	78	Promotion to the Second Division
3	Cowdenbeath	36	14	9	13	54	61	−7	51	
4	Queen's Park	36	13	9	14	51	50	+1	48	
5	Montrose	36	13	7	16	47	53	−6	46	

Source: "2004-2005 Third Division - SPFL Archive". SPFL.
Rules for classification: 1) points; 2) goal difference; 3) number of goals scored.
(C) Champions; (P) Promoted
