= Halcrow Stadium =

Scottish greyhound stadium

- Location: Annan Road, Gretna, Scotland DG16 5DQ
- Coordinates: 54°59′51.6″N 03°04′33.8″W
- Opened: 1986
- Closed: 2017

Halcrow Stadium was a greyhound racing stadium in Annan Road, Gretna, Scotland

== History ==
The plans to build a new greyhound stadium on a ten-acre site, west of Gretna were first instigated in 1983. The name Halcrow derives from Jim Halcrow a well-known Shetland accordionist. The construction was started by James Norman and sons as a replacement for the previous track at Raydale Park and the first race meeting took place in June 1986.

The original circumference of the track was 416 metres. Distances included 120, 300, 490 and 685 metres but later distances of 280 and 470 metres were used. The stadium was forced to suspend some racing in the Summer of 1987 due to a shortage of racing greyhounds.

The racing remained independent and was not controlled by the Greyhound Board of Great Britain. Amenities included several bars, a hospitality suite and function rooms for parties, weddings and traditional music events.

The stadium was also used for occasional concerts.

The track was closed in April 2017 and in 2021 was purchased by the Cunninghame Housing Association for the purposes of building new housing.
