= 2002–03 Scottish Third Division =

Scottish Third Division
- Season: 2002–03
- Champions: Greenock Morton
- Promoted: Greenock Morton; East Fife

The 2002–03 Scottish Third Division was won by Greenock Morton who, along with second placed East Fife, gained promotion to the Second Division. East Stirlingshire finished bottom. This season saw Gretna elected to the league, after the dissolution of Clydebank, who merged with Airdrieonians to form Airdrie United, Gretna finished in sixth place in their debut season.

Location of teams in 2002–03 Scottish Third Division

== Table ==
Pos	Team	Pld	W	D	L	GF	GA	GD	Pts	Promotion
1	Greenock Morton (C, P)	36	21	9	6	67	33	+34	72	Promotion to the Second Division
2	East Fife (P)	36	20	11	5	73	37	+36	71	Promotion to the Second Division
3	Albion Rovers	36	20	10	6	62	36	+26	70	
4	Peterhead	36	20	8	8	76	37	+39	68	
5	Stirling Albion	36	15	11	10	50	44	+6	56	
6	Gretna	36	11	12	13	50	50	0	45	
7	Montrose	36	7	12	17	35	61	−26	33	
8	Queen's Park	36	7	11	18	39	51	−12	32	
9	Elgin City	36	5	13	18	33	63	−30	28	
10	East Stirlingshire	36	2	7	27	32	105	−73	13	

Source: "2002-2003 Third Division - SPFL Archive". SPFL (in Polish).
Rules for classification: 1) points; 2) goal difference; 3) number of goals scored.
(C) Champions; (P) Promoted

== Events ==
In the course of a 3-1 loss to Albion Rovers, East Stirlingshire used four goalkeepers. Starting keeper Chris Todd was taken off injured after only seven minutes to be replaced by Scott Findlay who was sent off for fouling John Bradford 40 yards from goal eight minutes into the second half. Findlay was replaced by Graham McLaren, who was in turn shown the red card when he fouled Charles McLean inside the box to concede a penalty kick. Kevin McCann took over and tipped McLean's penalty effort over the crossbar

== Attendance ==
The average attendance for Scottish Third Division clubs for season 2002/03 are shown below:

Club	Average
Greenock Morton	2,333
East Fife	759
Queen's Park	719
Peterhead	712
Stirling Albion	658
Albion Rovers	491
Elgin City	484
Gretna	419
Montrose	376
East Stirlingshire	324
