= Mark Dobie =

English former professional football forward

Personal information
- Full name: Mark Walter Graham Dobie
- Date of birth: 8 November 1963 (age 62)
- Place of birth: Carlisle, England
- Position: Forward

Senior career*
Years	Team	Apps	(Gls)
- Carlisle City
19??–1986	Workington		
1986–1987	Carlisle United	6	(0)
1987	Penrith		
1987–19??	Barrow		
19??–1990	Gretna		
1990–1991	Cambridge United	0	(0)
1991–1992	Torquay United	20	(2)
1992–1993	Darlington	36	(8)
1993–19??	Gretna		
19??–1996	Barrow		
1996–19??	Queen of the South	18	(6)
19??–1997	Workington		
1997–1998	Lancaster City		
1998–19??	Gretna		
19??–1999	Barrow		
1999–2003	Gretna		
2003–2004	Annan Athletic		
- * Club domestic league appearances and goals

Mark Walter Graham Dobie (born 8 November 1963) is an English former professional football forward.

Dobie began his career with Carlisle City and joined Carlisle United on a free transfer from non-league Workington in December 1986. He made 6 appearances (4 as a substitute) that season, before returning to non-league football. In October 1987 he joined Barrow from Penrith, and in December 1990 he joined Cambridge United from Gretna, but failed to appear in United's league side.

In August 1991 he moved to Torquay United for £10,000, scoring only twice in 20 games as Torquay struggled to adapt to life in the old Division Three. He was released after Torquay's relegation, joining Darlington in August 1992. He had a fairly successful season with the Quakers, but left after only one season, returning to non-league football with Gretna. He later moved to Barrow before joining Scottish side Queen of the South in January 1996. From the Dumfries side he returned to Workington, then moved on to Lancaster City in April 1997. He was Lancaster's top scorer the following season, but in September 1998, the Lancaster Citizen reported that he was in a row with City, because he was training with Gretna and refusing to play for City. He subsequently joined Gretna, later returning to Barrow, before re-joining Gretna in August 1999. In the 2001–02 season he was top scorer in the Northern Premier League First Division at the age of 38, scoring 63 goals in Gretna's last two seasons in the Northern Premier League.

In the 2002 close season Gretna were elected to play in the Scottish Third Division. Dobie remained with Gretna, scoring ten times in 28 league games before joining Annan Athletic in 2003 and retiring at the end of the 2003–04 season.
