= 2003–04 Scottish Third Division =

Scottish Third Division
- Season: 2003–04
- Champions: Stranraer
- Promoted: Stranraer; Stirling Albion

The 2003–04 Scottish Third Division was won by Stranraer who, along with Stirling Albion, gained promotion to the Second Division. East Stirlingshire finished bottom.

Location of teams in 2003–04 Scottish Third Division

== Table ==
Pos	Team	Pld	W	D	L	GF	GA	GD	Pts	Promotion
1	Stranraer (C, P)	36	24	7	5	87	30	+57	79	Promotion to the Second Division
2	Stirling Albion (P)	36	23	8	5	78	27	+51	77	Promotion to the Second Division
3	Gretna	36	20	8	8	59	39	+20	68	
4	Peterhead	36	18	7	11	67	37	+30	61	
5	Cowdenbeath	36	15	10	11	46	39	+7	55	
6	Montrose	36	12	12	12	52	63	−11	48	
7	Queen's Park	36	10	11	15	41	53	−12	41	
8	Albion Rovers	36	12	4	20	66	75	−9	40	
9	Elgin City	36	6	7	23	48	93	−45	25	
10	East Stirlingshire	36	2	2	32	30	118	−88	8	

Source: "2003-2004 Third Division - SPFL Archive". SPFL.
Rules for classification: 1) points; 2) goal difference; 3) number of goals scored.
(C) Champions; (P) Promoted

== Top scorers ==
Scorer	Goals	Team
(Scotland) Michael Moore	24	Stranraer
(Scotland) Scott McLean	21	Stirling Albion
(Scotland) David Graham	18	Stranraer
(Scotland) Martin Johnston	18	Peterhead
(Scotland) Paul McManus	18	Albion Rovers
(Scotland) Martin Cameron	17	Gretna
(Scotland) Martin Bavidge	16	Peterhead
(Scotland) Alex Bone	15	Elgin City
(Scotland) Scott Michie	13	Montrose
(Scotland) Dene Shields	12	Cowdenbeath

== Attendance ==
The average attendance for Scottish Third Division clubs for season 2003/04 are shown below:

Club	Average
Stirling Albion	754
Peterhead	579
Elgin City	526
Queen's Park	516
Stranraer	513
Gretna	465
Montrose	361
Albion Rovers	348
Cowdenbeath	306
East Stirlingshire	278
