= Scott Findlay =

Scottish footballer (born 1983)

Personal information
- Date of birth: 16 October 1983 (age 43)
- Place of birth: Perth, Scotland
- Position: Goalkeeper

Team information
- Current team: St Johnstone (goalkeeper coach)

Youth career
- 1998-2001: St Johnstone

Senior career*
Years	Team	Apps	(Gls)
2001-2002	St Johnstone	0	(0)
2001-2004	Livingston	0	(0)
2003	→ East Stirlingshire (loan)	18	(0)
2004	Forfar		
2004	Cowdenbeath	0	(0)
2004-2006	East Fife		
2006-2007	Alloa		
2009	Raith Rovers		
2010	Clyde	2	(0)
2010-2011	Dundee	0	(0)
- * Club domestic league appearances and goals

Scott Findlay (born 16 October 1983) is a Scottish former professional footballer who played as a goalkeeper for Dundee and Livingston.

== Club career ==
Findlay started his career in the youth academy of St Johnstone, joining the club when he was 14 years old. He moved to Livingston in 2001. However he didn't make his first senior team appearance until 2002 during a loan spell at East Stirling. The Shire fell to a 4-1 defeat to East Fife on 10 August 2002.

He signed for Cowdenbeath in 2004 on a short term deal but failed to make an appearance for the club.

Findlay had a short spell at Alloa under Allan Maitland. Findlay was "badly at fault" as Alloa threw away a two-goal lead during one of his rare appearances, against Ayr United in 2007. "All the goals were saveable," Maitland said post-match.

The goalkeeper signed for Clyde in 2010 and made two appearances.

== Coaching career ==
Findlay is currently head goalkeeper coach at St Johnstone.
