= 1997–98 FA Trophy =

1997-98 FA Trophy
FA Challenge Trophy

Tournament details
- Country: England; Wales
- Teams: 177

Final positions
- Champions: Cheltenham Town
- Runners-up: Southport

The 1997–98 FA Trophy was the twenty-ninth season of the FA Trophy. This was the first year that penalty kicks were used to settle drawn replays, prior to this multiple replays were possible.

== First qualifying round ==
=== Ties ===
Tie	Home team	Score	Away team
1	Aldershot Town	5-1	Croydon
2	Ashford Town (Kent)	2-1	V S Rugby
3	Basingstoke Town	2-0	Leatherhead
4	Bedworth United	3-1	Stocksbridge Park Steels
5	Belper Town	2-2	Droylsden
6	Billericay Town	4-0	Grays Athletic
7	Blakenall	2-3	Spennymoor United
8	Bognor Regis Town	4-0	Thame United
9	Brackley Town	2-2	Worcester City
10	Buxton	0-1	Alfreton Town
11	Cambridge City	2-1	Maidenhead United
12	Carshalton Athletic	2-0	Racing Club Warwick
13	Corby Town	4-3	Newport A F C
14	Crawley Town	2-1	Kingstonian
15	Eastwood Town	1-1	Redditch United
16	Evesham United	1-2	Rothwell Town
17	Fareham Town	0-3	Witney Town
18	Fleet Town	2-2	Abingdon Town
19	Flixton	0-3	Matlock Town
20	Frickley Athletic	1-1	Leigh R M I
21	Hampton	0-1	Wokingham Town
22	Harrow Borough	1-1	Weston Super Mare
23	Havant Town	2-2	Hendon
24	Hitchin Town	7-1	Erith & Belvedere
25	Knowsley United scr-w/o Great Harwood Town		
26	Leyton Pennant	0-1	Baldock Town
27	Lincoln United	5-2	Trafford
28	Moor Green	1-0	Atherstone United
29	Netherfield	1-1	Whitby Town
30	Oxford City	6-0	Cinderford Town
31	Paget Rangers	0-0	Bilston Town
32	Radcliffe Borough w/o-scr Dudley Town		
33	Romford	2-0	Chertsey Town
34	Solihull Borough	3-0	Shepshed Dynamo
35	Stafford Rangers	1-1	Hinckley United
36	Sutton Coldfield Town	2-1	Gretna
37	Tamworth	5-1	Congleton Town
38	Tonbridge Angels	1-0	Newport I O W
39	Trowbridge Town	1-2	Raunds Town
40	Uxbridge	2-2	Weymouth
41	Walton & Hersham	3-0	Staines Town
42	Waterlooville	2-1	Fisher Athletic London
43	Wembley	2-6	Gravesend & Northfleet
44	Whitley Bay	0-1	Worksop Town
45	Whyteleafe	1-5	Margate
46	Winsford United	2-0	Ilkeston Town
47	Wisbech Town	4-3	Clevedon Town
48	Witton Albion	3-0	Farsley Celtic
49	Yate Town	1-3	Molesey

=== Replays ===
Tie	Home team	Score	Away team
2	Droylsden	2-3	Belper Town
9	Worcester City	5-0	Brackley Town
15	Redditch United	3-0	Eastwood Town
18	Abingdon Town	2-0	Fleet Town
20	Leigh R M I	2-1	Frickley Athletic
22	Weston Super Mare	1-2	Harrow Borough
23	Hendon	2-1	Havant Town
29	Whitby Town	3-3	Netherfield
	(Whitby Town won 4-3 on penalties)		
31	Bilston Town	2-2	Paget Rangers
	(Bilston Town won 4-3 on penalties)		
35	Hinckley United	1-0	Stafford Rangers
40	Weymouth	1-2	Uxbridge

== Second qualifying round ==
=== Ties ===
Tie	Home team	Score	Away team
1	Abingdon Town	2-0	Wokingham Town
2	Ashford Town (Kent)	1-2	Raunds Town
3	Baldock Town	1-2	Corby Town
4	Basingstoke Town	2-0	Witney Town
5	Berkhamsted Town	4-0	Worcester City
6	Billericay Town	4-0	Forest Green Rovers
7	Bognor Regis Town	2-3	Chesham United
8	Bromley	2-1	Hendon
9	Cambridge City	1-1	Dartford
10	Carshalton Athletic	0-0	Aldershot Town
11	Cirencester Town	1-0	Gravesend & Northfleet
12	Crawley Town	1-2	Bishop's Stortford
13	Gainsborough Trinity	3-0	Bedworth United
14	Harrow Borough	5-0	Molesey
15	Hinckley United	3-1	Whitby Town
16	Hitchin Town	3-0	Barton Rovers
17	Lincoln United	1-2	Belper Town
18	Margate	4-0	Waterlooville
19	Matlock Town	4-1	Sutton Coldfield Town
20	Oxford City	0-2	Wisbech Town
21	Radcliffe Borough	1-1	Leigh R M I
22	Redditch United	1-3	Worksop Town
23	Romford	5-1	Rothwell Town
24	Solihull Borough	9-1	Alfreton Town
25	Stourbridge	1-1	Great Harwood Town
26	Tamworth	4-3	Moor Green
27	Tonbridge Angels	0-3	Hastings Town
28	Uxbridge	0-1	Worthing
29	Walton & Hersham	0-0	Bashley
30	Winsford United	1-0	Spennymoor United
31	Witton Albion	0-0	Bilston Town
32	Workington	1-1	Harrogate Town

=== Replays ===
Tie	Home team	Score	Away team
9	Dartford	0-1	Cambridge City
10	Aldershot Town	3-0	Carshalton Athletic
21	Leigh R M I	1-0	Radcliffe Borough
25	Great Harwood Town	3-1	Stourbridge
29	Bashley	2-0	Walton & Hersham
31	Bilston Town	2-2	Witton Albion
	(Witton Albion won 6-5 on penalties)		
32	Harrogate Town	0-0	Workington
	(Harrogate Town won 5-4 on penalties)		

== Third qualifying round ==
=== Ties ===
Tie	Home team	Score	Away team
1	Accrington Stanley	0-5	Runcorn
2	Aylesbury United	0-3	Dulwich Hamlet
3	Barrow	4-1	Hinckley United
4	Bashley	4-1	Cirencester Town
5	Basingstoke Town	4-0	Romford
6	Belper Town	1-5	Boston United
7	Berkhamsted Town	2-1	Salisbury City
8	Billericay Town	2-1	Aldershot Town
9	Bradford Park Avenue	1-1	Leigh R M I
10	Bromley	1-4	Purfleet
11	Bromsgrove Rovers	1-2	Worksop Town
12	Chesham United	2-1	Sutton United
13	Corby Town	2-2	Margate
14	Dorchester Town	3-0	Worthing
15	Gainsborough Trinity	1-0	Bamber Bridge
16	Great Harwood Town	0-1	Witton Albion
17	Halesowen Town	1-2	Burton Albion
18	Harrogate Town	0-3	Blyth Spartans
19	Harrow Borough	1-3	Bath City
20	Hastings Town	4-0	Heybridge Swifts
21	Hitchin Town	0-2	Boreham Wood
22	King's Lynn	1-4	Chelmsford City
23	Marine	1-1	Grantham Town
24	Matlock Town	1-1	Winsford United
25	Merthyr Tydfil	2-2	Cambridge City
26	Nuneaton Borough	0-2	Altrincham
27	Sittingbourne	1-1	Abingdon Town
28	Solihull Borough	2-1	Emley
29	St Albans City	5-2	Bishop's Stortford
30	Tamworth	0-1	Lancaster City
31	Wisbech Town	2-2	Raunds Town
32	Yeading	2-0	St Leonards Stamcroft

=== Replays ===
Tie	Home team	Score	Away team
9	Leigh R M I	1-0	Bradford Park Avenue
13	Margate	5-1	Corby Town
23	Grantham Town	1-0	Marine
24	Winsford United	0-0	Matlock Town
	(Winsford United won 5-3 on penalties)		
25	Cambridge City	6-3	Merthyr Tydfil
27	Abingdon Town	1-2	Sittingbourne
31	Raunds Town	4-0	Wisbech Town

== 1st round ==
The teams that given byes to this round are Woking, Hereford United, Kidderminster Harriers, Stevenage Borough, Morecambe, Northwich Victoria, Farnborough Town, Hednesford Town, Telford United, Gateshead, Southport, Rushden & Diamonds, Stalybridge Celtic, Kettering Town, Hayes, Slough Town, Dover Athletic, Welling United, Halifax Town, Leek Town, Yeovil Town, Cheltenham Town, Guiseley, Enfield, Hyde United, Gresley Rovers, Chorley, Gloucester City, Bishop Auckland, Colwyn Bay, Dagenham & Redbridge and Ashton United.

=== Ties ===
Tie	Home team	Score	Away team
1	Altrincham	2-0	Runcorn
2	Ashton United	0-0	Chorley
3	Barrow	1-1	Worksop Town
4	Bashley	3-0	Raunds Town
5	Basingstoke Town	0-1	Gloucester City
6	Bath City	0-0	Hastings Town
7	Bishop Auckland	3-1	Colwyn Bay
8	Boreham Wood	2-1	Chelmsford City
9	Burton Albion	2-1	Witton Albion
10	Dagenham & Redbridge	1-0	Billericay Town
11	Enfield	1-1	Cheltenham Town
12	Grantham Town	1-1	Leigh R M I
13	Gresley Rovers	4-4	Leek Town
14	Guiseley	0-0	Telford United
15	Halifax Town	2-1	Blyth Spartans
16	Hayes	4-0	Cambridge City
17	Hednesford Town	2-1	Gainsborough Trinity
18	Hereford United	3-0	Dulwich Hamlet
19	Hyde United	2-1	Boston United
20	Kettering Town	1-0	Dorchester Town
21	Kidderminster Harriers	4-1	Berkhamsted Town
22	Lancaster City	0-3	Northwich Victoria
23	Morecambe	4-0	Solihull Borough
24	Purfleet	0-1	Dover Athletic
25	Rushden & Diamonds	4-0	Farnborough Town
26	Southport	3-0	Winsford United
27	St Albans City	0-0	Sittingbourne
28	Stalybridge Celtic	2-4	Gateshead
29	Stevenage Borough	2-2	Chesham United
30	Welling United	1-1	Slough Town
31	Woking	0-1	Margate
32	Yeovil Town	0-0	Yeading

=== Replays ===
Tie	Home team	Score	Away team
2	Chorley	0-2	Ashton United
3	Worksop Town	2-4	Barrow
6	Hastings Town	0-1	Bath City
11	Cheltenham Town	5-1	Enfield
12	Leigh R M I	0-0	Grantham Town
	(Grantham Town won 4-3 on penalties)		
13	Leek Town	3-1	Gresley Rovers
14	Telford United	4-0	Guiseley
27	Sittingbourne	0-1	St Albans City
29	Chesham United	0-3	Stevenage Borough
30	Slough Town	2-1	Welling United
32	Yeading	1-0	Yeovil Town

== 2nd round ==
=== Ties ===
Tie	Home team	Score	Away team
1	Altrincham	2-0	Morecambe
2	Barrow	2-1	St Albans City
3	Bath City	2-3	Grantham Town
4	Bishop Auckland	1-4	Boreham Wood
5	Cheltenham Town	3-1	Rushden & Diamonds
6	Dagenham & Redbridge	0-5	Hyde United
7	Gateshead	1-2	Stevenage Borough
8	Gloucester City	1-1	Burton Albion
9	Halifax Town	1-1	Slough Town
10	Hayes	5-0	Kidderminster Harriers
11	Hednesford Town	5-0	Leek Town
12	Hereford United	0-2	Dover Athletic
13	Margate	1-2	Bashley
14	Northwich Victoria	4-0	Kettering Town
15	Telford United	0-1	Ashton United
16	Yeading	0-6	Southport

=== Replays ===
Tie	Home team	Score	Away team
8	Burton Albion	2-2	Gloucester City
	(Gloucester City won 6-5 on penalties)		
9	Slough Town	2-0	Halifax Town

== 3rd round ==
=== Ties ===
Tie	Home team	Score	Away team
1	Altrincham	0-2	Southport
2	Ashton United	0-1	Cheltenham Town
3	Barrow	1-0	Northwich Victoria
4	Grantham Town	2-1	Hednesford Town
5	Hayes	2-0	Bashley
6	Hyde United	0-2	Dover Athletic
7	Slough Town	1-1	Boreham Wood
8	Stevenage Borough	1-1	Gloucester City

=== Replays ===
Tie	Home team	Score	Away team
7	Boreham Wood	1-2	Slough Town
8	Gloucester City	1-2	Stevenage Borough

== 4th round ==
=== Ties ===
Tie	Home team	Score	Away team
1	Cheltenham Town	1-0	Hayes
2	Dover Athletic	1-1	Barrow
3	Grantham Town	1-1	Southport
4	Stevenage Borough	0-1	Slough Town

=== Replays ===
Tie	Home team	Score	Away team
2	Barrow	0-0	Dover Athletic
	(Dover Athletic won 5-4 on penalties)		
3	Southport	3-1	Grantham Town

== Semi finals ==
=== First leg ===
Tie	Home team	Score	Away team
1	Cheltenham Town	2-1	Dover Athletic
2	Slough Town	0-1	Southport

=== Second leg ===
Tie	Home team	Score	Away team	Aggregate
1	Dover Athletic	2-2	Cheltenham Town	3-4
2	Southport	1-1	Slough Town	2-1

== Final ==
Home team	Score	Away team
Cheltenham Town	1-0	Southport
