= 1998–99 FA Trophy =

FA Challenge Trophy

Tournament details
- Country: England; Wales
- Teams: 176

Final positions
- Champions: Kingstonian
- Runners-up: Forest Green Rovers

The 1998–99 FA Trophy was the thirtieth season of the FA Trophy.

== 1st round ==
=== Ties ===
| Tie | Home team | Score | Away team |
|---|---|---|---|
| 1 | Ashton United | 6-0 | Bloxwich Town |
| 2 | Bashley | 4-0 | Staines Town |
| 3 | Belper Town | 1-3 | Radcliffe Borough |
| 4 | Bilston Town | 3-4 | Hyde United |
| 5 | Bishop Auckland | 4-2 | Matlock Town |
| 6 | Blakenall | 2-0 | Ilkeston Town |
| 7 | Blyth Spartans | 2-2 | Whitby Town |
| 8 | Brackley Town | 1-4 | Grays Athletic |
| 9 | Bradford Park Avenue | 3-0 | Stourbridge |
| 10 | Braintree Town | 4-1 | Fleet Town |
| 11 | Burton Albion | 0-0 | Grantham Town |
| 12 | Canvey Island | 1-0 | Wisbech Town |
| 13 | Chertsey Town | 0-5 | Gloucester City |
| 14 | Cirencester Town | 1-0 | Cinderford Town |
| 15 | Croydon | 0-2 | Baldock Town |
| 16 | Dagenham & Redbridge | 1-1 | Wealdstone |
| 17 | Dorchester Town | 0-2 | Bath City |
| 18 | Eastwood Town | 2-2 | Runcorn |
| 19 | Erith & Belvedere | 1-1 | Newport I O W |
| 20 | Farsley Celtic | 1-1 | Accrington Stanley |
| 21 | Folkestone Invicta | 2-1 | Hampton |
| 22 | Gateshead | 2-2 | Paget Rangers |
| 23 | Gresley Rovers | 1-0 | Stamford |
| 24 | Gretna | 3-1 | Solihull Borough |
| 25 | Halesowen Town | 0-2 | Guiseley |
| 26 | Harrow Borough | 4-2 | Cambridge City |
| 27 | Hastings Town | 2-2 | Chelmsford City |
| 28 | Hinckley United | 2-1 | Congleton Town |
| 29 | Leatherhead | 1-2 | Crawley Town |
| 30 | Leyton Pennant | 4-3 | Purfleet |
| 31 | Maidenhead United | 1-1 | Yate Town |
| 32 | Marine | 2-3 | Frickley Athletic |
| 33 | Molesey | 1-2 | Boreham Wood |
| 34 | Newport A F C | 2-4 | Heybridge Swifts |
| 35 | Redditch United | 3-0 | V S Rugby |
| 36 | Salisbury City | 2-1 | Carshalton Athletic |
| 37 | Spennymoor United | 0-1 | Trafford |
| 38 | St Leonards | 2-4 | Enfield |
| 39 | Stafford Rangers | 4-2 | Lancaster City |
| 40 | Stalybridge Celtic | 2-1 | Flixton |
| 41 | Stocksbridge Park Steels | 1-1 | Boston United |
| 42 | Sutton Coldfield Town | 2-2 | Bamber Bridge |
| 43 | Walton & Hersham | 2-2 | Weston Super Mare |
| 44 | Wembley | 1-2 | Witney Town |
| 45 | Weymouth | 1-0 | King's Lynn |
| 46 | Whyteleafe | 3-1 | Bishop's Stortford |
| 47 | Winsford United | 0-1 | Gainsborough Trinity |
| 48 | Worcester City | 2-1 | Billericay Town |

=== Replays ===
| Tie | Home team | Score | Away team |
|---|---|---|---|
| 7 | Whitby Town | 3-1 | Blyth Spartans |
| 11 | Grantham Town | 0-3 | Burton Albion |
| 6 | Wealdstone | 0-5 | Dagenham & Redbridge |
| 18 | Runcorn | 2-1 | Eastwood Town |
| 19 | Newport I O W | 4-3 | Erith & Belvedere |
| 20 | Accrington Stanley | 4-1 | Farsley Celtic |
| 22 | Paget Rangers | 1-0 | Gateshead |
| 27 | Chelmsford City | 0-1 | Hastings Town |
| 31 | Yate Town | 1-2 | Maidenhead United |
| 41 | Boston United | 1-0 | Stocksbridge Park Steels |
| 42 | Bamber Bridge | 2-1 | Sutton Coldfield Town |
| 43 | Weston Super Mare | 2-0 | Walton & Hersham |

== 2nd round ==
The teams that given byes to this round are Cheltenham Town, Doncaster Rovers, Woking, Rushden & Diamonds, Morecambe, Hereford United, Hednesford Town, Northwich Victoria, Welling United, Yeovil Town, Hayes, Dover Athletic, Kettering Town, Stevenage Borough, Southport, Kidderminster Harriers, Farnborough Town, Leek Town, Telford United, Forest Green Rovers, Barrow, Kingstonian, Slough Town, Chorley, Colwyn Bay, Merthyr Tydfil, Leigh R M I, Sutton United, Hendon, Emley, Altrincham, Basingstoke Town, Atherstone United, St Albans City, Nuneaton Borough, Gravesend & Northfleet, Chesham United, Tamworth, Bromley, Rothwell Town, Dulwich Hamlet, Aylesbury United, Bromsgrove Rovers, Aldershot Town, Worksop Town, Sittingbourne, Ashford Town (Kent), Yeading, Alfreton Town, Hitchin Town, Oxford City, Fisher Athletic London, Margate, Droylsden, Lincoln United, Uxbridge, Raunds Town, Moor Green, Witton Albion, Romford, Clevedon Town, Bognor Regis Town, Havant & Waterlooville, Dartford, Worthing, Tonbridge Angels, Whitley Bay, Berkhamsted Town, Bedworth United, Racing Club Warwick, Shepshed Dynamo, Netherfield Kendal, Barton Rovers, Evesham United, Harrogate Town, Corby Town, Great Harwood Town, Andover, Burscough and Hucknall Town.

=== Ties ===
| Tie | Home team | Score | Away team |
|---|---|---|---|
| 1 | Aldershot Town | 3-1 | Bromley |
| 2 | Alfreton Town | 1-2 | Droylsden |
| 3 | Altrincham | 2-2 | Burscough |
| 4 | Ashford Town (Kent) | 0-2 | Hastings Town |
| 5 | Ashton United | 1-0 | Leek Town |
| 6 | Atherstone United | 0-0 | Southport |
| 7 | Aylesbury United | 1-1 | Harrow Borough |
| 8 | Bishop Auckland | 1-1 | Guiseley |
| 9 | Blakenall | 1-1 | Telford United |
| 10 | Bognor Regis Town | 1-3 | Witney Town |
| 11 | Boston United | 1-1 | Worksop Town |
| 12 | Bromsgrove Rovers | 1-2 | Hednesford Town |
| 13 | Burton Albion | 5-0 | Bamber Bridge |
| 14 | Cheltenham Town | 2-1 | Bashley |
| 15 | Cirencester Town | 0-3 | Dulwich Hamlet |
| 16 | Colwyn Bay | 3-2 | Stafford Rangers |
| 17 | Crawley Town | 2-2 | Sittingbourne |
| 18 | Dagenham & Redbridge | 3-2 | Barton Rovers |
| 19 | Doncaster Rovers | 0-2 | Frickley Athletic |
| 20 | Dover Athletic | 4-1 | Welling United |
| 21 | Emley | 1-0 | Whitley Bay |
| 22 | Evesham United | 1-1 | Canvey Island |
| 23 | Farnborough Town | 1-1 | Dartford |
| 24 | Fisher Athletic London | 1-1 | Worcester City |
| 25 | Forest Green Rovers | 4-1 | Boreham Wood |
| 26 | Gainsborough Trinity | 4-1 | Harrogate Town |
| 27 | Gloucester City | 1-2 | Kingstonian |
| 28 | Grays Athletic | 2-3 | Whyteleafe |
| 29 | Gretna | 1-1 | Shepshed Dynamo |
| 30 | Hayes | 1-1 | Folkestone Invicta |
| 31 | Hendon | 1-1 | Rothwell Town |
| 32 | Hereford United | 1-1 | Hitchin Town |
| 33 | Heybridge Swifts | 1-2 | Sutton United |
| 34 | Hinckley United | 2-0 | Gresley Rovers |
| 35 | Hucknall Town | 2-1 | Barrow |
| 36 | Kettering Town | 4-0 | Andover |
| 37 | Kidderminster Harriers | 2-2 | Lincoln United |
| 38 | Leigh R M I | 4-1 | Morecambe |
| 39 | Leyton Pennant | 0-3 | St Albans City |
| 40 | Maidenhead United | 1-0 | Clevedon Town |
| 41 | Margate | 1-3 | Havant & Waterlooville |
| 42 | Merthyr Tydfil | 0-2 | Basingstoke Town |
| 43 | Newport I O W | 1-0 | Gravesend & Northfleet |
| 44 | Northwich Victoria | 3-0 | Netherfield Kendal |
| 45 | Nuneaton Borough | 1-1 | Hyde United |
| 46 | Oxford City | 0-1 | Enfield |
| 47 | Paget Rangers | 0-2 | Accrington Stanley |
| 48 | Racing Club Warwick | 1-1 | Raunds Town |
| 49 | Radcliffe Borough | 5-1 | Great Harwood Town |
| 50 | Redditch United | 3-2 | Corby Town |
| 51 | Romford | 3-3 | Worthing |
| 52 | Runcorn | 3-0 | Moor Green |
| 53 | Rushden & Diamonds | 2-0 | Bath City |
| 54 | Slough Town | 3-1 | Baldock Town |
| 55 | Stevenage Borough | 4-0 | Uxbridge |
| 56 | Tamworth | 1-3 | Stalybridge Celtic |
| 57 | Trafford | 1-3 | Chorley |
| 58 | Weston Super Mare | 1-1 | Berkhamsted Town |
| 59 | Weymouth | 2-1 | Braintree Town |
| 60 | Whitby Town | 4-0 | Bedworth United |
| 61 | Witton Albion | 0-2 | Bradford Park Avenue |
| 62 | Woking | 2-1 | Salisbury City |
| 63 | Yeading | 3-3 | Chesham United |
| 64 | Yeovil Town | 1-0 | Tonbridge Angels |

=== Replays ===
| Tie | Home team | Score | Away team |
|---|---|---|---|
| 3 | Burscough | 1-3 | Altrincham |
| 6 | Southport | 2-1 | Atherstone United |
| 7 | Harrow Borough | 2-3 | Aylesbury United |
| 8 | Guiseley | 3-1 | Bishop Auckland |
| 9 | Telford United | 2-1 | Blakenall |
| 11 | Worksop Town | 0-4 | Boston United |
| 17 | Sittingbourne | 1-5 | Crawley Town |
| 22 | Canvey Island | 5-0 | Evesham United |
| 23 | Dartford | 1-2 | Farnborough Town |
| 24 | Worcester City | 5-0 | Fisher Athletic London |
| 29 | Shepshed Dynamo | 2-0 | Gretna |
| 30 | Folkestone Invicta | 3-2 | Hayes |
| 31 | Rothwell Town | 1-2 | Hendon |
| 32 | Hitchin Town | 2-1 | Hereford United |
| 37 | Lincoln United | 2-1 | Kidderminster Harriers |
| 45 | Hyde United | 1-0 | Nuneaton Borough |
| 48 | Raunds Town | 2-0 | Racing Club Warwick |
| 51 | Worthing | 4-3 | Romford |
| 58 | Berkhamsted Town | 0-2 | Weston Super Mare |
| 63 | Chesham United | 4-0 | Yeading |

== 3rd round ==
=== Ties ===
| Tie | Home team | Score | Away team |
|---|---|---|---|
| 1 | Accrington Stanley | 1-3 | Ashton United |
| 2 | Aldershot Town | 1-0 | Maidenhead United |
| 3 | Altrincham | 1-0 | Burton Albion |
| 4 | Aylesbury United | 2-0 | Newport I O W |
| 5 | Basingstoke Town | 0-2 | Yeovil Town |
| 6 | Cheltenham Town | 2-1 | Canvey Island |
| 7 | Chorley | 1-1 | Guiseley |
| 8 | Colwyn Bay | 1-1 | Hednesford Town |
| 9 | Crawley Town | 2-3 | Chesham United |
| 10 | Dagenham & Redbridge | 1-1 | Farnborough Town |
| 11 | Droylsden | 2-3 | Telford United |
| 12 | Dulwich Hamlet | 1-2 | Whyteleafe |
| 13 | Forest Green Rovers | 4-0 | Witney Town |
| 14 | Gainsborough Trinity | 1-4 | Boston United |
| 15 | Hastings Town | 0-3 | St Albans City |
| 16 | Havant & Waterlooville | 0-1 | Worcester City |
| 17 | Hitchin Town | 3-3 | Enfield |
| 18 | Hucknall Town | 1-3 | Redditch United |
| 19 | Kingstonian | 5-2 | Kettering Town |
| 20 | Leigh R M I | 0-1 | Southport |
| 21 | Lincoln United | 2-5 | Bradford Park Avenue |
| 22 | Radcliffe Borough | 1-2 | Northwich Victoria |
| 23 | Runcorn | 2-1 | Hyde United |
| 24 | Shepshed Dynamo | 1-1 | Emley |
| 25 | Slough Town | 1-2 | Rushden & Diamonds |
| 26 | Stalybridge Celtic | 0-3 | Hinckley United |
| 27 | Stevenage Borough | 3-2 | Dover Athletic |
| 28 | Weston Super Mare | 2-2 | Raunds Town |
| 29 | Weymouth | 1-0 | Sutton United |
| 30 | Whitby Town | 2-1 | Frickley Athletic |
| 31 | Woking | 8-4 | Folkestone Invicta |
| 32 | Worthing | 0-2 | Hendon |

=== Replays ===
| Tie | Home team | Score | Away team |
|---|---|---|---|
| 7 | Guiseley | 2-1 | Chorley |
| 8 | Hednesford Town | 2-2 | Colwyn Bay |
| | (Colwyn Bay won 5-4 on penalties) | | |
| 10 | Farnborough Town | 1-1 | Dagenham & Redbridge |
| | (Dagenham & Redbridge won 4-2 on penalties) | | |
| 17 | Enfield | 0-1 | Hitchin Town |
| 24 | Emley | 3-1 | Shepshed Dynamo |
| 28 | Raunds Town | 0-1 | Weston Super Mare |

== 4th round ==
=== Ties ===
| Tie | Home team | Score | Away team |
|---|---|---|---|
| 1 | Aldershot Town | 1-2 | Altrincham |
| 2 | Ashton United | 2-2 | St Albans City |
| 3 | Aylesbury United | 0-1 | Whitby Town |
| 4 | Boston United | 2-0 | Redditch United |
| 5 | Cheltenham Town | 0-0 | Stevenage Borough |
| 6 | Chesham United | 0-2 | Hendon |
| 7 | Colwyn Bay | 3-1 | Bradford Park Avenue |
| 8 | Dagenham & Redbridge | 4-0 | Telford United |
| 9 | Guiseley | 0-2 | Emley |
| 10 | Hitchin Town | 2-1 | Weston Super Mare |
| 11 | Northwich Victoria | 1-0 | Worcester City |
| 12 | Runcorn | 2-3 | Southport |
| 13 | Weymouth | 1-2 | Forest Green Rovers |
| 14 | Whyteleafe | 0-3 | Kingstonian |
| 15 | Woking | 0-0 | Rushden & Diamonds |
| 16 | Yeovil Town | 3-2 | Hinckley United |

=== Replays ===
| Tie | Home team | Score | Away team |
|---|---|---|---|
| 2 | St Albans City | 2-1 | Ashton United |
| 5 | Stevenage Borough | 0-0 | Cheltenham Town |
| | (Cheltenham won 5-4 on penalties) | | |
| 15 | Rushden & Diamonds | 1-2 | Woking |

== 5th round ==
=== Ties ===
| Tie | Home team | Score | Away team |
|---|---|---|---|
| 1 | Boston United | 2-0 | Altrincham |
| 2 | Cheltenham Town | 3-0 | Hendon |
| 3 | Dagenham & Redbridge | 1-2 | St Albans City |
| 4 | Emley | 2-0 | Whitby Town |
| 5 | Hitchin Town | 1-2 | Forest Green Rovers |
| 6 | Kingstonian | 1-0 | Yeovil Town |
| 7 | Northwich Victoria | 3-1 | Colwyn Bay |
| 8 | Woking | 0-0 | Southport |

=== Replays ===
| Tie | Home team | Score | Away team |
|---|---|---|---|
| 8 | Southport | 1-0 | Woking |

== Quarter finals ==
=== Ties ===
| Tie | Home team | Score | Away team |
|---|---|---|---|
| 1 | Emley | 0-1 | Cheltenham Town |
| 2 | Forest Green Rovers | 4-1 | Southport |
| 3 | Northwich Victoria | 0-2 | Kingstonian |
| 4 | St Albans City | 2-1 | Boston United |

== Semi-finals ==
=== First leg ===
| Tie | Home team | Score | Away team |
|---|---|---|---|
| 1 | Kingstonian | 2–2 | Cheltenham Town |
| 2 | St Albans City | 1–1 | Forest Green Rovers |

=== Second leg ===
| Tie | Home team | Score | Away team | Aggregate |
|---|---|---|---|---|
| 1 | Cheltenham Town | 1–3 | Kingstonian | 3–5 |
| 2 | Forest Green Rovers | 3–2 | St Albans City | 4–3 |

== Final ==
| Home team | Score | Away team |
|---|---|---|
| Forest Green Rovers | 0–1 | Kingstonian |
