= Kenny Deuchar =

Scottish footballer (born 1980)

Personal information
- Full name: Kenneth Robert John Deuchar
- Date of birth: 6 July 1980 (age 46)
- Place of birth: Stirling, Scotland
- Position: Forward

Youth career
- Camelon

Senior career*
Years	Team	Apps	(Gls)
1999–2002	Falkirk	24	(1)
2002–2004	East Fife	66	(31)
2004–2008	Gretna	93	(63)
2007	→ Northampton Town (loan)	17	(3)
2007	→ St Johnstone (loan)	10	(6)
2008	Real Salt Lake	29	(3)
2009	Hamilton Academical	9	(0)
2009–2010	St Johnstone	35	(5)
2010–2011	Falkirk	15	(3)
2011–2012	Livingston	38	(12)
2012	→ Stenhousemuir (loan)	9	(0)
2014	Arbroath	9	(2)
Total		354	(129)
- * Club domestic league appearances and goals

Kenneth Robert John Deuchar (born 6 July 1980) is a Scottish former professional footballer who played as a forward. He is also a practising medical doctor.

In his professional footballing career he played for Falkirk (two spells), East Fife, Gretna, Northampton Town, St Johnstone (two spells), Real Salt Lake, Hamilton Academical, Livingston and Stenhousemuir, when he initially retired for two years before returning to play for Arbroath for a further year.

== Footballing career ==
=== Youth career ===
During his youth career, Kenny played for Denny BC, Deanburn BC (Bo'ness), Stenhousemuir Pro Youth, Aberforth Rangers Amateurs (Saturday Amateurs League), Dundee University Medical School AFC, Bonnybridge Juniors, Falkirk Pro Youth.

=== Falkirk ===
Deuchar was born in Stirling and began his part-time footballing career at Falkirk, where he made his debut on 10 August 1999 in a Scottish League Challenge Cup match against Stranraer. He scored his first career goal against Inverness Caledonian Thistle.

=== East Fife ===
After suffering a string of injuries at Falkirk, including two broken legs, he left to join East Fife. He made his debut for the club on 3 August 2002 against Peterhead, and scored his first goals, a brace on 7 September, against Gretna in a Scottish League Cup match. He led East Fife to promotion, whilst also working as a full-time doctor. During his two seasons with the club he scored thirty four goals in seventy seven appearances.

=== Gretna ===
He was offered a place at big-spending Scottish Third Division club Gretna, and signed immediately. In his first season, he led Gretna to the Second Division, smashing records along the way. He shattered the record for most league goals in a season of 24 with 38 goals in only 30 games. During a friendly against Threave Rovers in 2006 he managed to score eleven goals in an 18–0 thrashing. He did not leave medicine behind completely, as he continued to work one day a week at a Scottish hospital while at Gretna and worked one day a week at Wishaw General Infirmary before his move to the US In the 2005–06 season, he equalled Jimmy Greaves' British football record of six league hat-tricks in one season.

Jeff Stelling, host of Sky Sports' Soccer Saturday programme, always made reference to "The Good Doctor" having scored a goal whenever Deuchar's name appeared on the vidiprinter.

During the 2006–07 season, he fell out of favour, but still managed to score 4 goals in 9 matches. On 1 December 2006, Gretna officially announced that Deuchar had requested a transfer.

On 31 January 2007, he joined Northampton Town on loan until the end of the season and on 24 February 2007, Deuchar scored his first goal for Northampton in their 3–0 victory over Rotherham, which was his first goal in English football.

On 5 May 2007, Deuchar's final game for Northampton Town away at Doncaster Rovers, the Northampton fans' held a "Doctor's Day" in his honour and donned white doctors' jackets for the game. Deuchar came on after 63 minutes as a substitute and immediately the Cobblers equalised to draw the game 2–2.

On 30 August 2007, Deuchar joined St Johnstone on emergency loan until 3 December 2007. During this three-month period he scored ten goals in fourteen games and helped the Saints to a Challenge Cup win, their first cup success in their history. He scored one of the goals as St Johnstone won the 2007 Scottish Challenge Cup Final against Dunfermline Athletic. On 3 December, he returned to Gretna and scored six goals in his eleven SPL games for the bottom club.

=== Real Salt Lake ===
On 26 February 2008, Deuchar signed with Major League Soccer side Real Salt Lake. His final game with Gretna saw him score 2 goals against Rangers, but Gretna lost 4–2. He made his debut for his new club as a 70th-minute substitute for Real Salt Lake in their 1–1 draw with Chicago Fire on 29 March 2008. He went on to score his first goal in a 3–1 defeat away at the hands of CD Chivas USA on 5 April 2008. Deuchar helped RSL to their first playoff appearance in their history and on to the Western Conference Final appearing in 30 of the team's 33 games that season.

=== Hamilton Academical ===
On 19 January 2009, Deuchar joined SPL side Hamilton Academical on a short-term contract. He made his debut for the club on 7 February in a Scottish FA Cup victory against Dundee United. He went on to appear ten times for the club, but without scoring.

=== St Johnstone (second spell) ===
On 4 June 2009, Deuchar signed for SPL newcomers St Johnstone, eighteen months after being on loan to the club. He scored the first goals during his second spell at St Johnstone when he bagged a brace against Stenhousemuir in the League Cup. He scored a further goal against Forfar in the Scottish Cup before scoring his first league goal of the season in a 1–0 win over Hearts. In total he made forty appearances, scoring ten goals making him joint top scorer for the club that season with Liam Craig.

=== Falkirk (second spell) ===
Deuchar returned to his original club, Falkirk, on 1 July 2010. He made his second debut for the club on 7 August against Dunfermline, and scored his first goal on 11 September in a 3–1 win against Queen of the South. He made only five starts for the club and scored three times.

=== Livingston ===
He joined Livingston on 18 January 2011 after being released by Falkirk and scored a hat-trick on his debut the same day in a 4–2 win over East Fife. On 9 August 2011, he became the first Livingston player to score two hat-tricks for the club in the emphatic 5–0 victory over Stirling Albion in the second round of the Challenge Cup.

=== Stenhousemuir ===
He joined Stenhousemuir in February 2012 on loan until the end of the season.

=== Arbroath ===
On 11 February 2014, Deuchar came out of footballing retirement to join Arbroath until the end of the season.

== Outside football ==
In 2009 Deuchar was a company director in Town House Restaurants Ltd which owned and operated the Wheelhouse restaurant, located close to the Falkirk Wheel in Falkirk and the Boathouse restaurant at Auchinstary basin, in Kilsyth. In 2018 the company went into liquidation and the restaurants were sold.

== Career statistics ==
Appearances and goals by club, season and competition
Club	Season	League			National cup (Note: Includes Scottish Cup, FA Cup, Open Cup.)		League cup (Note: Includes Scottish League Cup, EFL Cup.)		Continental		Other		Total	
Club	Season	Division	Apps	Goals	Apps	Goals	Apps	Goals	Apps	Goals	Apps	Goals	Apps	Goals
Falkirk	1999–2000	Scottish First Division	0	0	0	0	0	0			1 (Note: Appearance(s) in Scottish League Challenge Cup)	0	1	0
Falkirk	2000–01	Scottish First Division	11	0	0	0	0	0			–		11	0
Falkirk	2001–02	Scottish First Division	13	1	2	0	1	0			1	0	17	1
Falkirk	Total		24	1	2	0	1	0			2	0	29	1
East Fife	2002–03	Scottish Third Division	32	21	2	0	2	2	–		1	0	37	23
East Fife	2003–04	Scottish Second Division	34	10	4	1	1	0	–		1	0	40	11
East Fife	Total		66	31	6	1	3	2	0	0	2	0	77	34
Gretna	2004–05	Scottish Third Division	36	38	2	3	1	0			2	0	41	41
Gretna	2005–06	Scottish Second Division	34	18	7	4	1	0			1	1	43	23
Gretna	2006–07	Scottish First Division	8	1	0	0	0	0	2	0	1	0	11	1
Gretna	2007–08	Scottish Premier League	15	6	2	0	0	0			–		17	6
Gretna	Total		93	63	11	7	2	0	2	0	4	1	112	71
Northampton (loan)	2006–07	Football League One	17	3	0	0	0	0	–		–		17	3
St Johnstone (loan)	2007–08	Scottish First Division	10	6	0	0	0	0			4	2	14	8
Real Salt Lake	2008	Major League Soccer	29	3	0	0					1 (Note: Appearance in MLS Cup Playoffs)	0	30	3
Hamilton Academical	2008–09	Scottish Premier League	9	0	1	0	0	0	0	0	–		10	0
St Johnstone	2009–10	Scottish Premier League	35	5	2	1	3	2	0	0	–		40	8
Falkirk	2010–11	Scottish First Division	15	3	0	0	1	0	0	0	–		16	3
Livingston	2010–11	Scottish Second Division	19	8	0	0	0	0	–		–		19	8
Livingston	2011–12	Scottish First Division	19	4	0	0	3	0	–		1	0	23	4
Livingston	Total		38	12	0	0	3	0	0	0	1	0	42	12
Stenhousemuir (loan)	2011–12	Scottish First Division	9	0	0	0	0	0	–		–		9	0
Arbroath	2013–14	Scottish League One	9	2	0	0	0	0	–		–		9	2
Career total			354	129	22	9	13	4	2	0	14	3	405	145

== Honours ==
East Fife

- Scottish Third Division promotion (1): 2002–03

Gretna

- Scottish Third Division (1): 2004–05
- Scottish Second Division (1): 2005–06
- Scottish Cup Runner- up (1): 2006
- Scottish First Division (1): 2006–07

St Johnstone

- Scottish Challenge Cup (1): 2007–08

Livingston

- Scottish Second Division (1): 2010–11
