= 1988–89 FA Trophy =

FA Challenge Trophy

Tournament details
- Country: England; Wales
- Teams: 181

Final positions
- Champions: Telford United
- Runners-up: Macclesfield Town

The 1988–89 FA Trophy was the twentieth season of the FA Trophy.

== First qualifying round ==
=== Ties ===
Tie	Home team	Score	Away team
1	Accrington Stanley	1–1	Fleetwood Town
2	Alfreton Town	2–2	North Shields
3	Ashford Town (Kent)	2–0	Burnham
4	Barking	1–1	Basildon United
5	Barry Town	4–1	Bideford
6	Basingstoke Town	1–0	Folkestone
7	Bedworth United	1–0	Stourbridge
8	Billericay Town	1–5	Kingstonian
9	Bridgend Town	1–6	Salisbury
10	Chesham United	2–0	Collier Row
11	Chester-Le-Street Town	0–0	Radcliffe Borough
12	Croydon	1–0	Walton & Hersham
13	Dudley Town	4–1	Congleton Town
14	Easington Colliery	6–0	Crook Town
15	Erith & Belvedere	0–3	Dover Athletic
16	Farnborough Town	2–2	Hampton
17	Ferryhill Athletic	0–3	Brandon United
18	Forest Green Rovers	1–2	Gloucester City
19	Frome Town	0–0	Cwmbran Town
20	Gainsborough Trinity	1–0	Halesowen Town
21	Goole Town	3–0	Horwich R M I
22	Gosport Borough	2–0	Trowbridge Town
23	Grantham	2–1	Shepshed Charterhouse
24	Gravesend & Northfleet	1–1	Bognor Regis Town
25	Hayes	4–2	Bracknell Town
26	Leatherhead	2–1	Kingsbury Town
27	Lewes	2–2	Dulwich Hamlet
28	Maesteg Park	0–2	Weston Super Mare
29	Matlock Town	3–1	Redditch United
30	Metropolitan Police	2–1	Boreham Wood
31	Moor Green	2–4	Eastwood Town
32	Ryhope Community Association	0–1	Gretna
33	Seaham Red Star	0–2	Guisborough Town
34	Sheppey United	3–2	Banbury United
35	South Liverpool	4–1	Mossley
36	Southport	3–4	Buxton
37	Staines Town	3–0	Dunstable
38	Stalybridge Celtic	2–0	Shildon
39	Sutton Coldfield Town	2–3	Colwyn Bay
40	Taunton Town	0–2	Dorchester Town
41	Thanet United	1–0	Hitchin Town
42	Ton Pentre	3–3	Andover
43	Tonbridge	0–3	Grays Athletic
44	Tow Law Town	1–3	Stockton
45	Uxbridge	4–0	Witney Town
46	V S Rugby	1–3	Atherstone United
47	Wembley	2–1	Chelmsford City
48	Willenhall Town	4–3	Leek Town
49	Winsford United	1–4	Coventry Sporting
50	Wivenhoe Town	0–0	Chalfont St Peter
51	Woking	1–1	St Albans City
52	Worcester City	4–0	Waterlooville
53	Workington	0–0	Worksop Town

=== Replays ===
Tie	Home team	Score	Away team
1	Fleetwood Town	2–1	Accrington Stanley
2	North Shields	2–1	Alfreton Town
4	Basildon United	2–3	Barking
11	Radcliffe Borough	1–0	Chester-Le-Street Town
16	Hampton	2–3	Farnborough Town
19	Cwmbran Town	2–4	Frome Town
24	Bognor Regis Town	1–1	Gravesend & Northfleet
27	Dulwich Hamlet	4–1	Lewes
42	Andover	3–2	Ton Pentre
50	Chalfont St Peter	1–3	Wivenhoe Town
51	St Albans City	1–4	Woking
53	Worksop Town	3–2	Workington

=== 2nd replay ===
Tie	Home team	Score	Away team
24	Gravesend & Northfleet	1–0	Bognor Regis Town

== Second qualifying round ==
=== Ties ===
Tie	Home team	Score	Away team
1	Andover	2–5	Salisbury
2	Ashford Town (Kent)	2–1	Dulwich Hamlet
3	Atherstone United	4–1	Bedworth United
4	Barking	0–1	Gravesend & Northfleet
5	Brandon United	1–5	Buxton
6	Chesham United	1–3	Basingstoke Town
7	Colwyn Bay	2–1	Hednesford Town
8	Coventry Sporting	1–4	Eastwood Town
9	Croydon	2–1	Staines Town
10	Dorchester Town	1–0	Barry Town
11	Dover Athletic	6–0	King's Lynn
12	Dudley Town	1–1	Willenhall Town
13	Easington Colliery	2–2	Radcliffe Borough
14	Farnborough Town	1–2	Wivenhoe Town
15	Fleetwood Town	2–1	Stalybridge Celtic
16	Gloucester City	3–2	Frome Town
17	Gosport Borough	4–0	Poole Town
18	Grantham	1–1	Alvechurch
19	Gretna	1–0	Guisborough Town
20	Hayes w/o-scr Oxford City		
21	Kingstonian	2–0	Wembley
22	Leicester United	0–0	Gainsborough Trinity
23	Marlow	2–1	Grays Athletic
24	Metropolitan Police	1–2	Carshalton Athletic
25	North Shields	3–3	South Liverpool
26	Sheppey United	0–2	Woking
27	Southwick	0–4	Uxbridge
28	Stockton	0–0	Penrith
29	Thanet United	0–3	Leatherhead
30	Wellingborough Town	0–1	Matlock Town
31	Weston Super Mare	0–2	Worcester City
32	Worksop Town	0–1	Goole Town

=== Replays ===
Tie	Home team	Score	Away team
12	Willenhall Town	0–1	Dudley Town
13	Radcliffe Borough	2–0	Easington Colliery
18	Alvechurch	0–1	Grantham
22	Gainsborough Trinity	2–4	Leicester United
25	South Liverpool	2–2	North Shields
28	Penrith	4–5	Stockton

=== 2nd replay ===
Tie	Home team	Score	Away team
25	South Liverpool	2–1	North Shields

== Third qualifying round ==
=== Ties ===
Tie	Home team	Score	Away team
1	Ashford Town (Kent)	0–3	Slough Town
2	Bangor City	2–0	Rhyl
3	Billingham Synthonia	1–1	Bishop Auckland
4	Bishop's Stortford	3–3	Gravesend & Northfleet
5	Carshalton Athletic	2–1	Leatherhead
6	Corby Town	2–2	Colwyn Bay
7	Crawley Town	3–4	Woking
8	Croydon	2–2	Dagenham
9	Dorchester Town	1–1	Gloucester City
10	Dover Athletic	3–2	Tooting & Mitcham United
11	Dudley Town	1–2	Atherstone United
12	Eastwood Town	1–3	Buxton
13	Gateshead	0–1	South Liverpool
14	Grantham	2–2	Matlock Town
15	Harrow Borough	1–1	Windsor & Eton
16	Hendon	3–3	Hayes
17	Leicester United	1–0	Caernarfon Town
18	Leyton Wingate	2–2	Welling United
19	Leytonstone Ilford	0–1	Uxbridge
20	Merthyr Tydfil	5–0	Salisbury
21	Morecambe	1–1	Fleetwood Town
22	Northwich Victoria	2–0	Goole Town
23	Saltash United	1–2	Gosport Borough
24	South Bank	5–0	Radcliffe Borough
25	Spennymoor United	0–0	Gretna
26	Whitby Town	2–2	Stockton
27	Whitley Bay	0–1	Frickley Athletic
28	Witton Albion	2–1	Nuneaton Borough
29	Wivenhoe Town	2–3	Kingstonian
30	Worcester City	1–0	Marlow
31	Worthing	1–2	Basingstoke Town
32	Wycombe Wanderers	2–0	Cambridge City

=== Replays ===
Tie	Home team	Score	Away team
3	Bishop Auckland	3–1	Billingham Synthonia
4	Gravesend & Northfleet	2–1	Bishop's Stortford
6	Colwyn Bay	2–1	Corby Town
8	Dagenham	0–0	Croydon
9	Gloucester City	1–3	Dorchester Town
14	Matlock Town	3–0	Grantham
15	Windsor & Eton	2–0	Harrow Borough
16	Hayes	0–2	Hendon
18	Welling United	3–1	Leyton Wingate
21	Fleetwood Town	4–0	Morecambe
25	Gretna	3–0	Spennymoor United
26	Stockton	3–0	Whitby Town

=== 2nd replay ===
Tie	Home team	Score	Away team
8	Croydon	0–1	Dagenham

== 1st round ==
The teams that given byes to this round are Enfield, Newport County, Barnet, Kettering Town, Runcorn Linnets, Telford United, Stafford Rangers, Kidderminster Harriers, Sutton United, Maidstone United, Weymouth, Macclesfield Town, Cheltenham Town, Altrincham, Fisher Athletic, Boston United, Aylesbury United, Chorley, Yeovil Town, Bath City, Wealdstone, Dartford, Marine, Bromsgrove Rovers, Burton Albion, Fareham Town, Blyth Spartans, Hyde United, Barrow, Bromley, Wokingham Town and Newcastle Blue Star.

=== Ties ===
Tie	Home team	Score	Away team
1	Atherstone United	1–4	Barrow
2	Bangor City	2–3	South Bank
3	Barnet	1–1	Gravesend & Northfleet
4	Basingstoke Town	1–1	Kettering Town
5	Bath City	0–0	Wycombe Wanderers
6	Boston United	2–0	Stafford Rangers
7	Bromley	1–2	Wealdstone
8	Bromsgrove Rovers	2–3	Woking
9	Burton Albion	4–1	Chorley
10	Buxton	0–2	Altrincham
11	Colwyn Bay	1–1	Frickley Athletic
12	Dagenham	2–2	Aylesbury United
13	Dartford	4–0	Dorchester Town
14	Dover Athletic	3–1	Worcester City
15	Enfield	4–1	Hendon
16	Fareham Town	1–2	Yeovil Town
17	Fisher Athletic	0–1	Cheltenham Town
18	Fleetwood Town	0–0	Bishop Auckland
19	Kidderminster Harriers	2–1	Maidstone United
20	Leicester United	3–0	Blyth Spartans
21	Marine	2–2	Macclesfield Town
22	Matlock Town	2–6	Northwich Victoria
23	Newcastle Blue Star	1–0	South Liverpool
24	Runcorn	2–3	Gretna
25	Stockton	1–4	Hyde United
26	Sutton United	1–0	Kingstonian
27	Telford United	3–0	Witton Albion
28	Uxbridge	1–1	Carshalton Athletic
29	Welling United	4–0	Slough Town
30	Weymouth	2–1	Newport County
31	Windsor & Eton	2–0	Gosport Borough
32	Wokingham Town	2–2	Merthyr Tydfil

=== Replays ===
Tie	Home team	Score	Away team
3	Gravesend & Northfleet	2–1	Barnet
4	Kettering Town	5–3	Basingstoke Town
5	Wycombe Wanderers	4–0	Bath City
11	Frickley Athletic	3–0	Colwyn Bay
12	Aylesbury United	4–0	Dagenham
18	Bishop Auckland	5–1	Fleetwood Town
21	Macclesfield Town	4–1	Marine
28	Carshalton Athletic	5–2	Uxbridge
32	Merthyr Tydfil	1–0	Wokingham Town

== 2nd round ==
=== Ties ===
Tie	Home team	Score	Away team
1	Altrincham	2–0	Carshalton Athletic
2	Aylesbury United	1–3	Merthyr Tydfil
3	Boston United	3–2	Northwich Victoria
4	Cheltenham Town	0–0	Barrow
5	Dover Athletic	0–0	Dartford
6	Gravesend & Northfleet	1–1	Kettering Town
7	Hyde United	1–1	Gretna
8	Kidderminster Harriers	1–1	Burton Albion
9	Leicester United	1–3	Welling United
10	Newcastle Blue Star	3–1	Frickley Athletic
11	South Bank	0–3	Macclesfield Town
12	Sutton United	1–1	Bishop Auckland
13	Wealdstone	0–1	Wycombe Wanderers
14	Windsor & Eton	1–0	Enfield
15	Woking	2–1	Weymouth
16	Yeovil Town	1–4	Telford United

=== Replays ===
Tie	Home team	Score	Away team
4	Barrow	0–0	Cheltenham Town
5	Dartford	2–0	Dover Athletic
6	Kettering Town	1–2	Gravesend & Northfleet
7	Gretna	2–3	Hyde United
8	Burton Albion	0–1	Kidderminster Harriers
12	Bishop Auckland	2–1	Sutton United

=== 2nd replay ===
Tie	Home team	Score	Away team
4	Cheltenham Town	0–1	Barrow

== 3rd round ==
=== Ties ===
Tie	Home team	Score	Away team
1	Altrincham	5–3	Barrow
2	Dartford	2–0	Bishop Auckland
3	Kidderminster Harriers	1–1	Telford United
4	Macclesfield Town	2–0	Gravesend & Northfleet
5	Newcastle Blue Star	2–0	Woking
6	Welling United	0–0	Boston United
7	Windsor & Eton	2–2	Hyde United
8	Wycombe Wanderers	2–0	Merthyr Tydfil

=== Replays ===
Tie	Home team	Score	Away team
3	Telford United	2–0	Kidderminster Harriers
6	Boston United	0–1	Welling United
7	Hyde United	2–0	Windsor & Eton

== 4th round ==
=== Ties ===
Tie	Home team	Score	Away team
1	Dartford	1–0	Altrincham
2	Hyde United	1–0	Wycombe Wanderers
3	Macclesfield Town	1–0	Welling United
4	Newcastle Blue Star	1–4	Telford United

== Semi finals ==
=== First leg ===
Tie	Home team	Score	Away team
1	Dartford	0–0	Macclesfield Town
2	Hyde United	0–1	Telford United

=== Second leg ===
Tie	Home team	Score	Away team	Aggregate
1	Macclesfield Town	4–1	Dartford	4–1
2	Telford United	3–0	Hyde United	4–0

== Final ==
=== Tie ===
Home team	Score	Away team
Telford United	1–0	Macclesfield Town
