= 1999–2000 FA Trophy =

FA Challenge Trophy

Tournament details
- Country: England; Wales
- Teams: 177

Final positions
- Champions: Kingstonian
- Runners-up: Kettering Town

The 1999–2000 FA Trophy was the thirty-first season of the FA Trophy.

This season of the FA Trophy saw 177 teams participate, with matches starting in November 1999 and the final taking place in May 2000.

In the early rounds of the competition, lower ranked teams played each other, while higher ranked clubs entered the competition in the later stages. This edition was marked by exciting matches that showed the competitiveness of non-league clubs.

In the semifinals four teams fought for a place in the final, with matches being played over two legs, one at home and one away.

The 1999-2000 FA Trophy Final was held at the former Wembley Stadium in London on 14 May 2000. The competition finalists were Kingstonian and Kettering Town.

Kingstonian, the defending champions, emerged victorious once again, defeating Kettering Town 3-2 in a thrilling final.

== 1st round ==
=== Ties ===
Tie	Home team	Score	Away team
1	Atherstone United	0–3	Ossett Town
2	Barrow	4–0	Netherfield Kendal
3	Basingstoke Town	1–1	Bognor Regis Town
4	Bath City	1–0	Baldock Town
5	Bishop's Stortford	1–3	Gravesend & Northfleet
6	Blyth Spartans	3–0	Stourbridge
7	Braintree Town	3–2	Clevedon Town
8	Bromsgrove Rovers	2–5	Halesowen Town
9	Burscough	2–6	Ilkeston Town
10	Burton Albion	1–1	Trafford
11	Chertsey Town	1–2	Hampton & Richmond Borough
12	Chorley	0–1	Moor Green
13	Cinderford Town	1–2	Merthyr Tydfil
14	Cirencester Town	3–2	Cambridge City
15	Corby Town	2–1	Belper Town
16	Croydon	0–0	Margate
17	Emley	2–0	Colwyn Bay
18	Fisher Athletic London	1–3	Burnham
19	Frickley Athletic	1–1	Ashton United
20	Gateshead	4–1	Bradford Park Avenue
21	Gloucester City	4–2	Chesham United
22	Grantham Town	1–3	Matlock Town
23	Gresley Rovers	0–1	Redditch United
24	Guiseley	2–0	Flixton
25	Havant & Waterlooville	0–0	Aylesbury United
26	Heybridge Swifts	2–0	Weston Super Mare
27	Hinckley United	5–1	Congleton Town
28	Hitchin Town	1–1	Harrow Borough
29	Leatherhead	2–0	King's Lynn
30	Leek Town	2–2	Accrington Stanley
31	Leigh R M I	1–0	Boston United
32	Lincoln United	2–3	Hucknall Town
33	Newport County	2–1	Yeading
34	Oxford City	2–0	Hastings Town
35	Paget Rangers	0–1	Spennymoor United
36	Purfleet	2–0	Dagenham & Redbridge
37	Racing Club Warwick	1–3	Harlow Town
38	Raunds Town	0–0	Maidenhead United
39	Rocester	1–1	Farsley Celtic
40	Romford	1–1	Bashley
41	Rothwell Town	0–0	Boreham Wood
42	Salisbury City	2–0	Tonbridge Angels
43	Sittingbourne	1–3	Chelmsford City
44	Slough Town	0–2	Hendon
45	Solihull Borough	1–2	Runcorn
46	Spalding United	2–1	Shepshed Dynamo
47	St Albans City	1–2	Thame United
48	Tiverton Town	1–1	Dorchester Town
49	Worthing	5–1	Fleet Town

=== Replays ===
Tie	Home team	Score	Away team
3	Bognor Regis Town	2–0	Basingstoke Town
10	Trafford	1–3	Burton Albion
16	Margate	5–0	Croydon
19	Ashton United	2–4	Frickley Athletic
25	Aylesbury United	2–4	Havant & Waterlooville
28	Harrow Borough	2–1	Hitchin Town
30	Accrington Stanley	5–4	Leek Town
38	Maidenhead United	0–1	Raunds Town
39	Farsley Celtic	0–2	Rocester
40	Bashley	2–1	Romford
41	Boreham Wood	3–5	Rothwell Town
48	Dorchester Town	2–2	Tiverton Town
	(Tiverton Town won 5–3 on penalties)		

== 2nd round ==
The teams that given byes to this round are Kingstonian, Scarborough, Kettering Town, Hayes, Rushden & Diamonds, Yeovil Town, Stevenage Borough, Northwich Victoria, Woking, Hednesford Town, Dover Athletic, Forest Green Rovers, Hereford United, Morecambe, Kidderminster Harriers, Doncaster Rovers, Telford United, Southport, Welling United, Nuneaton Borough, Altrincham, Sutton United, Farnborough Town, Tamworth, Bromley, Dulwich Hamlet, Aldershot Town, Worksop Town, Ashford Town (Kent), Droylsden, Uxbridge, Witton Albion, Dartford, Whitley Bay, Bedworth United, Barton Rovers, Evesham United, Harrogate Town, Worcester City, Bamber Bridge, Enfield, Gainsborough Trinity, Whitby Town, Crawley Town, Hyde United, Stalybridge Celtic, Weymouth, Winsford United, Billericay Town, Marine, Walton & Hersham, Lancaster City, Carshalton Athletic, Bishop Auckland, Canvey Island, Wealdstone, Folkestone Invicta, Newport I O W, Eastwood Town, Grays Athletic, Radcliffe Borough, Stafford Rangers, Bilston Town, Blakenall, Stocksbridge Park Steels, Sutton Coldfield Town, Gretna, Leyton Pennant, Witney Town, Wisbech Town, Erith & Belvedere, St Leonards, Whyteleafe, Stamford, Staines Town, V S Rugby, Yate Town, Workington and Bedford Town.

=== Ties ===
Tie	Home team	Score	Away team
1	Accrington Stanley	2–2	Spalding United
2	Aldershot Town	3–1	Braintree Town
3	Altrincham	1–0	Gateshead
4	Ashford Town (Kent)	0–5	Woking
5	Bamber Bridge	0–2	Burton Albion
6	Barrow	2–3	Southport
7	Bashley	1–2	Newport County
8	Bath City	5–0	Erith & Belvedere
9	Bedworth United	0–2	Hednesford Town
10	Bilston Town	2–2	Workington
11	Blakenall	3–1	Eastwood Town
12	Blyth Spartans	2–0	Witton Albion
13	Bognor Regis Town	1–2	Walton & Hersham
14	Bromley	2–0	Chelmsford City
15	Cirencester Town	0–3	Forest Green Rovers
16	Crawley Town	0–2	Wealdstone
17	Dulwich Hamlet	1–1	Burnham
18	Enfield	2–2	Newport I O W
19	Folkestone Invicta	0–1	Kingstonian
20	Frickley Athletic	4–3	Droylsden
21	Gravesend & Northfleet	2–0	Worthing
22	Guiseley	2–0	Nuneaton Borough
23	Halesowen Town	3–1	Sutton Coldfield Town
24	Hampton & Richmond Borough	1–2	Carshalton Athletic
25	Harlow Town	2–3	Dover Athletic
26	Harrow Borough	0–0	Oxford City
27	Hayes	0–2	Worcester City
28	Hendon	1–0	Grays Athletic
29	Hereford United	1–0	Barton Rovers
30	Heybridge Swifts	3–2	Witney Town
31	Hinckley United	1–1	Marine
32	Hyde United	6–0	Whitley Bay
33	Ilkeston Town	2–4	Scarborough
34	Kettering Town	2–2	Thame United
35	Kidderminster Harriers	2–4	Telford United
36	Lancaster City	3–0	Corby Town
37	Leatherhead	0–0	Bedford Town
38	Leigh R M I	1–1	Worksop Town
39	Leyton Pennant	0–3	Staines Town
40	Margate	0–0	Dartford
41	Matlock Town	0–1	Harrogate Town
42	Merthyr Tydfil	0–0	Stevenage Borough
43	Morecambe	6–1	Hucknall Town
44	Ossett Town	0–1	Doncaster Rovers
45	Purfleet	5–0	Raunds Town
46	Radcliffe Borough	1–6	Moor Green
47	Rocester	1–2	Tamworth
48	Rothwell Town	4–1	Evesham United
49	Runcorn	2–0	Northwich Victoria
50	Rushden & Diamonds	1–0	Havant & Waterlooville
51	Salisbury City	2–5	Sutton United
52	Spennymoor United	2–1	Gretna
53	Stafford Rangers	1–4	Emley
54	Stalybridge Celtic	1–1	Gainsborough Trinity
55	Stocksbridge Park Steels	1–1	Redditch United
56	Tiverton Town	0–4	Farnborough Town
57	Uxbridge	0–2	Canvey Island
58	Welling United	2–1	Gloucester City
59	Weymouth	0–0	Yeovil Town
60	Whitby Town	4–1	Stamford
61	Whyteleafe	4–2	St Leonards
62	Winsford United	1–1	V S Rugby
63	Wisbech Town	1–2	Bishop Auckland
64	Yate Town	0–2	Billericay Town

=== Replays ===
Tie	Home team	Score	Away team
1	Spalding United	1–0	Accrington Stanley
10	Workington	3–2	Bilston Town
17	Burnham	1–0	Dulwich Hamlet
18	Newport I O W	1–0	Enfield
26	Oxford City	3–2	Harrow Borough
31	Marine	1–0	Hinckley United
34	Thame United	0–1	Kettering Town
37	Bedford Town	2–0	Leatherhead
38	Worksop Town	3–1	Leigh R M I
40	Dartford	2–2	Margate
	(Dartford won 4–2 on penalties)		
42	Stevenage Borough	4–0	Merthyr Tydfil
54	Gainsborough Trinity	1–3	Stalybridge Celtic
55	Redditch United	3–4	Stocksbridge Park Steels
59	Yeovil Town	2–1	Weymouth
62	V S Rugby	2–0	Winsford United

== 3rd round ==
=== Ties ===
Tie	Home team	Score	Away team
1	Aldershot Town	4–1	Staines Town
2	Bath City	1–2	Rushden & Diamonds
3	Bedford Town	0–0	Newport County
4	Billericay Town	3–1	Hereford United
5	Blakenall	2–1	Morecambe
6	Carshalton Athletic	0–1	Farnborough Town
7	Dartford	1–2	Heybridge Swifts
8	Doncaster Rovers	1–1	Halesowen Town
9	Emley	2–1	Frickley Athletic
10	Forest Green Rovers	4–1	Hendon
11	Gravesend & Northfleet	1–1	Dover Athletic
12	Hednesford Town	1–1	Hyde United
13	Kettering Town	2–0	Welling United
14	Marine	2–1	Guiseley
15	Oxford City	1–5	Burnham
16	Purfleet	1–1	Newport I O W
17	Rothwell Town	1–1	Walton & Hersham
18	Southport	0–0	Altrincham
19	Spalding United	2–2	Bishop Auckland
20	Spennymoor United	1–1	Harrogate Town
21	Stalybridge Celtic	1–0	Blyth Spartans
22	Stocksbridge Park Steels	0–0	Scarborough
23	Sutton United	1–0	Canvey Island
24	Tamworth	0–1	Runcorn
25	V S Rugby	1–4	Moor Green
26	Wealdstone	0–5	Kingstonian
27	Whitby Town	1–3	Telford United
28	Woking	4–2	Whyteleafe
29	Worcester City	2–1	Bromley
30	Workington	1–1	Burton Albion
31	Worksop Town	1–1	Lancaster City
32	Yeovil Town	2–1	Stevenage Borough

=== Replays ===
Tie	Home team	Score	Away team
3	Newport County	0–1	Bedford Town
8	Halesowen Town	2–3	Doncaster Rovers
11	Dover Athletic	2–1	Gravesend & Northfleet
12	Hyde United	2–0	Hednesford Town
16	Newport I O W	2–1	Purfleet
17	Walton & Hersham	1–0	Rothwell Town
18	Altrincham	1–1	Southport
	(Southport won 4–3 on penalties)		
19	Bishop Auckland	2–0	Spalding United
20	Harrogate Town	3–2	Spennymoor United
	(Ordered to be replayed)		
20	Harrogate Town	0–2	Spennymoor United
22	Scarborough	5–0	Stocksbridge Park Steels
30	Burton Albion	0–0	Workington
	(Workington won 4–2 on penalties)		
31	Lancaster City	0–3	Worksop Town

== 4th round ==
=== Ties ===
Tie	Home team	Score	Away team
1	Bedford Town	0–4	Yeovil Town
2	Billericay Town	0–0	Rushden & Diamonds
3	Blakenall	0–1	Marine
4	Burnham	1–1	Scarborough
5	Dover Athletic	1–0	Doncaster Rovers
6	Heybridge Swifts	1–0	Newport I O W
7	Hyde United	0–0	Runcorn
8	Kettering Town	2–2	Walton & Hersham
9	Kingstonian	2–1	Moor Green
10	Southport	2–0	Emley
11	Spennymoor United	0–3	Bishop Auckland
12	Stalybridge Celtic	0–1	Worcester City
13	Sutton United	3–0	Forest Green Rovers
14	Telford United	2–1	Farnborough Town
15	Woking	0–0	Aldershot Town
16	Worksop Town	1–1	Workington

=== Replays ===
Tie	Home team	Score	Away team
2	Rushden & Diamonds	2–1	Billericay Town
4	Scarborough	6–0	Burnham
7	Runcorn	3–2	Hyde United
8	Walton & Hersham	0–2	Kettering Town
15	Aldershot Town	0–1	Woking
16	Workington	1–0	Worksop Town

== 5th round ==
=== Ties ===
Tie	Home team	Score	Away team
1	Workington	0–1	Kettering Town
2	Southport	3–0	Woking
3	Yeovil Town	0–1	Kingstonian
4	Bishop Auckland	2–1	Scarborough
5	Rushden & Diamonds	1–0	Marine
6	Sutton United	2–1	Dover Athletic
7	Runcorn	2–1	Heybridge Swifts
8	Telford United	4–1	Worcester City

== Quarter finals ==
=== Ties ===
Tie	Home team	Score	Away team
1	Kingstonian	0–0	Southport
2	Sutton United	1–1	Rushden & Diamonds
3	Kettering Town	2–2	Bishop Auckland
4	Telford United	2–0	Runcorn

=== Replays ===
Tie	Home team	Score	Away team
1	Southport	0–1	Kingstonian
2	Rushden & Diamonds	1–3	Sutton United
3	Bishop Auckland	0–2	Kettering Town

== Semi finals ==
=== First leg ===
Tie	Home team	Score	Away team
1	Kettering Town	1–0	Telford United
2	Sutton United	1–1	Kingstonian

=== Second leg ===
Tie	Home team	Score	Away team	Aggregate
1	Telford United	0–0	Kettering Town	0–1
2	Kingstonian	6–0	Sutton United	7–1

== Final ==
=== Tie ===
Home team	Score	Away team
Kingstonian	3–2	Kettering Town
