= 1987–88 FA Trophy =

1987-88 FA Trophy
FA Challenge Trophy

Tournament details
- Country: England; Wales
- Teams: 192

Final positions
- Champions: Enfield
- Runners-up: Telford United

The 1987–88 FA Trophy was the nineteenth season of the FA Trophy.

== First qualifying round ==
=== Ties ===
Tie	Home team	Score	Away team
1	Alfreton Town	1-1	Gretna
2	Goole Town	0-4	Mossley
3	Workington	0-3	Brandon United
4	Crook Town	2-0	Shildon
5	Horwich R M I	1-2	South Liverpool
6	Ferryhill Athletic	1-4	North Shields
7	Penrith	0-2	Worksop Town
8	Radcliffe Borough	1-4	Tow Law Town
9	Billingham Synthonia	3-1	Ryhope Community Association
10	Easington Colliery	0-0	Stalybridge Celtic
11	Netherfield	0-0	Consett
12	Bedlington Terriers	1-2	Guisborough Town
13	Peterlee Newtown	2-3	Accrington Stanley
14	Chester-le-Street Town	0-1	Chorley
15	Bedworth United	0-0	Hednesford Town
16	Sutton Coldfield Town	4-2	Congleton Town
17	Winsford United	2-2	Witton Albion
18	Dudley Town	0-2	Matlock Town
19	Wolverton Town	0-5	Buxton
20	Moor Green	2-0	Halesowen Town
21	Grantham	1-2	Alvechurch
22	Eastwood Town	4-1	Colwyn Bay
23	Willenhall Town	3-1	Sutton Town
24	Shepshed Charterhouse	0-1	Redditch United
25	Stourbridge	0-0	Coventry Sporting
26	Leamington	0-1	Leicester United
27	V S Rugby	2-0	Chatham Town
28	King's Lynn	1-1	Leyton Wingate
29	Wellingborough Town	1-2	Billericay Town
30	Burnham	0-1	Hampton
31	Kingstonian	3-0	Uxbridge
32	Carshalton Athletic	5-3	Dunstable
33	Stevenage Borough	2-0	Wembley
34	Tilbury	3-1	Hayes
35	Basildon United	1-2	Gravesend & Northfleet
36	Cambridge City	3-0	Walthamstow Avenue
37	St Albans City	0-2	Bromley
38	Banbury United	3-1	Chesham United
39	Finchley	1-1	Hitchin Town
40	Boreham Wood	2-4	Kingsbury Town
41	Basingstoke Town	0-0	Folkestone
42	Southwick	3-1	Canterbury City
43	Tonbridge A F C	2-2	Tooting & Mitcham United
44	Dover	1-1	Leytonstone-Ilford
45	Woking	2-1	Bognor Regis Town
46	Walton & Hersham	0-0	Farnborough Town
47	Erith & Belvedere	0-1	Ashford Town (Kent)
48	Epsom & Ewell	0-0	Bracknell Town
49	Thanet United	1-0	Staines Town
50	Marlow	4-1	Maidenhead United
51	Sheppey United	0-0	Croydon
52	Leatherhead	4-2	Lewes
53	Barry Town	6-0	Llanelli
54	Taunton Town	1-4	Cwmbran Town
55	Waterlooville	4-1	Weston super Mare
56	Forest Green Rovers	3-0	Minehead
57	Worcester City	2-0	Bideford
58	Witney Town	2-0	Gosport Borough
59	Gloucester City	3-0	Andover
60	Frome Town	0-1	Clandown
61	Trowbridge Town	2-2	Ton Pentre
62	Poole Town	1-0	Oxford City
63	Salisbury	1-0	Dorchester Town
64	Maesteg Park	2-2	Melksham Town

=== Replays ===
Tie	Home team	Score	Away team
1	Gretna	2-4	Alfreton Town
10	Stalybridge Celtic	2-0	Easington Colliery
11	Consett	1-1	Netherfield
15	Hednesford Town	1-0	Bedworth United
17	Witton Albion	2-1	Winsford United
25	Coventry Sporting	1-3	Stourbridge
28	Leyton Wingate	1-0	King's Lynn
39	Hitchin Town	2-0	Finchley
41	Folkestone	2-3	Basingstoke Town
43	Tooting & Mitcham United	3-1	Tonbridge A F C
44	Leytonstone-Ilford	4-3	Dover
46	Farnborough Town	0-0	Walton & Hersham
48	Bracknell Town	0-2	Epsom & Ewell
51	Croydon	1-0	Sheppey United
61	Ton Pentre	2-3	Trowbridge Town
64	Melksham Town	4-0	Maesteg Park

=== 2nd replays ===
Tie	Home team	Score	Away team
11	Consett	1-0	Netherfield
46	Walton & Hersham	1-1	Farnborough Town

=== 3rd replay ===
Tie	Home team	Score	Away team
46	Farnborough Town	1-0	Walton & Hersham

== Second qualifying round ==
=== Ties ===
Tie	Home team	Score	Away team
1	Worksop Town	0-0	South Liverpool
2	Stalybridge Celtic	3-0	Consett
3	Chorley	2-3	Brandon United
4	Crook Town	3-7	Billingham Synthonia
5	North Shields	3-1	Accrington Stanley
6	Guisborough Town	4-1	Tow Law Town
7	Alfreton Town	3-0	Mossley
8	Redditch United	2-0	Willenhall Town
9	Witton Albion	5-0	Eastwood Town
10	Leicester United	0-4	Alvechurch
11	Buxton	3-1	Hednesford Town
12	Stourbridge	1-0	Moor Green
13	Sutton Coldfield Town	1-1	Matlock Town
14	Stevenage Borough	2-0	Kingstonian
15	Cambridge City	6-2	Bromley
16	Kingsbury Town	3-1	Billericay Town
17	Hampton	2-2	Gravesend & Northfleet
18	Carshalton Athletic	1-2	Hitchin Town
19	Banbury United	0-0	Tilbury
20	V S Rugby	2-3	Leyton-Wingate
21	Marlow	0-0	Thanet United
22	Tooting & Mitcham United	1-0	Epsom & Ewell
23	Leatherhead	0-1	Ashford Town (Kent)
24	Woking	2-1	Basingstoke Town
25	Croydon	1-3	Farnborough Town
26	Southwick	0-4	Leytonstone Ilford
27	Poole Town	3-0	Trowbridge Town
28	Waterlooville	3-1	Clandown
29	Melksham Town	0-2	Gloucester City
30	Worcester City	2-1	Barry Town
31	Salisbury	1-2	Witney Town
32	Cwmbran Town	1-2	Forest Green Rovers

=== Replays ===
Tie	Home team	Score	Away team
1	South Liverpool	4-1	Worksop Town
13	Matlock Town	2-2	Sutton Coldfield Town
17	Gravesend & Northfleet	1-2	Hampton
19	Tilbury	1-2	Banbury United
21	Thanet United	0-1	Marlow

=== 2nd replay ===
Tie	Home team	Score	Away team
13	Matlock Town	0-1	Sutton Coldfield Town

== Third qualifying round ==
=== Ties ===
Tie	Home team	Score	Away team
1	Spennymoor United	0-0	Whitley Bay
2	Whitby Town	7-1	North Shields
3	Newcastle Blue Star	2-0	Billingham Synthonia
4	South Bank	2-1	Guisborough Town
5	Southport	0-2	Gateshead
6	Brandon United	1-2	South Liverpool
7	Morecambe	2-4	Barrow
8	Stalybridge Celtic	0-1	Frickley Athletic
9	Witton Albion	2-0	Matlock Town
10	Stourbridge	1-2	Rhyl
11	Leek Town	0-1	Hyde United
12	Redditch United	1-1	Northwich Victoria
13	Caernarfon Town	1-0	Alfreton Town
14	Buxton	4-1	Gainsborough Trinity
15	Leyton Wingate	3-1	Leytonstone-Ilford
16	Farnborough Town	3-1	Hitchin Town
17	Cambridge City	2-1	Stevenage Borough
18	Hampton	1-2	Crawley Town
19	Grays Athletic	0-2	Welling United
20	Worthing	2-0	Chelmsford City
21	Hendon	3-1	Woking
22	Marlow	1-0	Alvechurch
23	Dulwich Hamlet	1-2	Harrow Borough
24	Banbury United	3-2	Barking
25	Tooting & Mitcham United	4-0	Kingsbury Town
26	Ashford Town (Kent)	1-2	Aylesbury United
27	Gloucester City	4-0	Forest Green Rovers
28	Witney Town	2-4	Wokingham Town
29	Slough Town	3-3	Saltash United
30	Waterlooville	0-2	Windsor & Eton
31	Bridgend Town	0-6	Poole Town
32	Worcester City	0-1	Merthyr Tydfil

=== Replays ===
Tie	Home team	Score	Away team
1	Whitley Bay	1-1	Spennymoor United
12	Northwich Victoria	4-1	Redditch United
29	Saltash United	2-4	Slough Town

=== 2nd replay ===
Tie	Home team	Score	Away team
1	Spennymoor United	3-1	Whitley Bay

== 1st round ==
=== Ties ===
Tie	Home team	Score	Away team
1	Kidderminster Harriers	1-1	Frickley Athletic
2	Bromsgrove Rovers	2-2	Blyth Spartans
3	Newcastle Blue Star	0-3	Rhyl
4	South Liverpool	1-1	Lincoln City
5	Gateshead	0-0	Corby Town
6	Burton Albion	0-0	Barrow
7	Nuneaton Borough	1-1	Marine
8	Bangor City	2-2	Boston United
9	Caernarfon Town	1-1	Stafford Rangers
10	Hyde United	0-1	Altrincham
11	Buxton	2-4	Telford United
12	Witton Albion	2-1	Whitby Town
13	Runcorn	2-0	Northwich Victoria
14	South Bank	0-0	Spennymoor United
15	Macclesfield Town	2-1	Bishop Auckland
16	Welling United	1-6	Leyton Wingate
17	Fareham Town	0-2	Hendon
18	Fisher Athletic	2-0	Marlow
19	Enfield	4-2	Worthing
20	Slough Town	3-1	Dagenham
21	Windsor & Eton	1-1	Barnet
22	Gloucester City	1-3	Yeovil Town
23	Farnborough Town	0-2	Crawley Town
24	Sutton United	0-2	Bishop's Stortford
25	Cambridge City	2-1	Poole Town
26	Aylesbury United	1-1	Kettering Town
27	Banbury United	2-2	Wealdstone
28	Wokingham Town	4-0	Tooting & Mitcham United
29	Bath City	2-1	Merthyr Tydfil
30	Harrow Borough	1-1	Weymouth
31	Maidstone United	5-1	Dartford
32	Wycombe Wanderers	2-3	Cheltenham Town

=== Replays ===
Tie	Home team	Score	Away team
1	Frickley Athletic	1-3	Kidderminster Harriers
2	Blyth Spartans	2-2	Bromsgrove Rovers
4	Lincoln City	2-2	South Liverpool
5	Corby Town	0-2	Gateshead
6	Barrow	3-0	Burton Albion
7	Marine	2-1	Nuneaton Borough
8	Boston United	0-0	Bangor City
9	Stafford Rangers	1-0	Caernarfon Town
14	Spennymoor United	1-0	South Bank
21	Barnet	2-1	Windsor & Eton
26	Kettering Town	5-1	Aylesbury United
27	Wealdstone	1-0	Banbury United
30	Weymouth	1-2	Harrow Borough

=== 2nd replays ===
Tie	Home team	Score	Away team
2	Bromsgrove Rovers	3-2	Blyth Spartans
4	Lincoln City	3-1	South Liverpool
8	Boston United	2-1	Bangor City

== 2nd round ==
=== Ties ===
Tie	Home team	Score	Away team
1	Kidderminster Harriers	0-2	Runcorn
2	Lincoln City	2-1	Cambridge City
3	Rhyl	0-2	Macclesfield Town
4	Cheltenham Town	2-0	Crawley Town
5	Hendon	1-1	Barrow
6	Fisher Athletic	2-1	Slough Town
7	Spennymoor United	1-0	Harrow Borough
8	Gateshead	0-4	Wokingham Town
9	Enfield	3-1	Bishop's Stortford
10	Leyton Wingate	5-2	Boston United
11	Witton Albion	3-1	Yeovil Town
12	Bath City	0-2	Stafford Rangers
13	Marine	0-4	Maidstone United
14	Wealdstone	0-3	Telford United
15	Barnet	0-0	Bromsgrove Rovers
16	Altrincham	1-1	Kettering Town

=== Replays ===
Tie	Home team	Score	Away team
5	Barrow	2-1	Hendon
15	Bromsgrove Rovers	3-1	Barnet
16	Kettering Town	2-3	Altrincham

== 3rd round ==
=== Ties ===
Tie	Home team	Score	Away team
1	Wokingham Town	3-0	Spennymoor United
2	Altrincham	1-1	Fisher Athletic
3	Runcorn	0-1	Barrow
4	Cheltenham Town	2-1	Bromsgrove Rovers
5	Leyton Wingate	1-2	Macclesfield Town
6	Lincoln City	2-1	Maidstone United
7	Witton Albion	1-2	Enfield
8	Telford United	1-1	Stafford Rangers

=== Replays ===
Tie	Home team	Score	Away team
2	Fisher Athletic	0-0	Altrincham
8	Stafford Rangers	2-3	Telford United

=== 2nd replay ===
Tie	Home team	Score	Away team
2	Fisher Athletic	1-1	Altrincham

=== 3rd replay ===
Tie	Home team	Score	Away team
2	Altrincham	1-0	Fisher Athletic

== 4th round ==
=== Ties ===
Tie	Home team	Score	Away team
1	Enfield	1-0	Lincoln City
2	Wokingham Town	2-0	Macclesfield Town
3	Cheltenham Town	2-4	Telford United
4	Altrincham	0-0	Barrow

=== Replays ===
Tie	Home team	Score	Away team
4	Barrow	2-1	Altrincham

== Semi finals ==
=== First leg ===
Tie	Home team	Score	Away team
1	Barrow	1-2	Enfield
2	Telford United	2-0	Wokingham Town

=== Second leg ===
Tie	Home team	Score	Away team	Aggregate
1	Enfield	0-1	Barrow	2-2
2	Wokingham Town	0-1	Telford United	0-3

=== Replay ===
Tie	Home team	Score	Away team
1	Barrow	1-1	Enfield

=== 2nd replay ===
Tie	Home team	Score	Away team
1	Barrow	0-1	Enfield

== Final ==
=== Tie ===
Home team	Score	Away team
Enfield	0-0	Telford United

=== Replay ===
Home team	Score	Away team
Enfield	3-2	Telford United
