= 2000–01 FA Trophy =

FA Challenge Trophy

Tournament details
- Country: England; Wales
- Teams: 175

Final positions
- Champions: Canvey Island
- Runners-up: Forest Green Rovers

The 2000–01 FA Trophy was the thirty-second season of the FA Trophy.

The competition was won by Essex-side Canvey Island, who defeated Forest Green Rovers 1–0 in the Final at Villa Park, Birmingham.

== 1st round ==
=== Ties ===
Tie	Home team	Score	Away team
1	Ashton United	5-0	Solihull Borough
2	Aylesbury United	1-1	Rugby United
3	Baldock Town	1-1	Staines Town
4	Bamber Bridge	1-3	Atherstone United
5	Barrow	0-1	Runcorn
6	Barton Rovers	2-1	Banbury United
7	Bashley	1-0	Salisbury City
8	Bedford Town	1-2	Newport County
9	Belper Town	4-1	Blakenall
10	Billericay Town	2-0	Farnborough Town
11	Bishop Auckland	1-1	Whitby Town
12	Blyth Spartans	2-0	Hinckley United
13	Bognor Regis Town	0-0	Whyteleafe
14	Cambridge City	1-0	Gloucester City
15	Chelmsford City	0-2	St Albans City
16	Chorley	1-1	Accrington Stanley
17	Cinderford Town	1-1	Dulwich Hamlet
18	Cirencester Town	0-1	Clevedon Town
19	Colwyn Bay	3-3	Tamworth
20	Corby Town	3-5	Matlock Town
21	Crawley Town	2-1	Heybridge Swifts
22	Dartford	0-3	Northwood
23	Dorchester Town	2-1	Boreham Wood
24	Droylsden	0-0	Bromsgrove Rovers
25	Enfield	4-2	Erith & Belvedere
26	Fisher Athletic London	3-2	Burnham
27	Folkestone Invicta	2-2	Oxford City
28	Ford United	4-2	St Leonards
29	Gainsborough Trinity	3-2	Bradford Park Avenue
30	Gravesend & Northfleet	0-1	Hastings Town
31	Grays Athletic	3-4	Ashford Town (Kent)
32	Gretna	2-1	Workington
33	Guiseley	4-1	Eastwood Town
34	Halesowen Town	1-3	Bilston Town
35	Hampton & Richmond Borough	1-4	Maidenhead United
36	Harlow Town	2-1	Basingstoke Town
37	Harrogate Town	3-3	Witton Albion
38	Havant & Waterlooville	2-1	Croydon
39	Hendon	2-0	Tonbridge Angels
40	Ilkeston Town	1-3	Altrincham
41	Kendal Town	2-2	Stamford
42	Langney Sports	0-1	Histon
43	Leatherhead	1-2	Evesham United
44	Leek Town	2-2	Radcliffe Borough
45	Moor Green	0-1	Hucknall Town
46	Newport I O W	2-2	Hitchin Town
47	North Ferriby United	2-3	Gresley Rovers
48	Paget Rangers	1-2	Worksop Town
49	Racing Club Warwick	0-4	Lancaster City
50	Redditch United	3-1	Grantham Town
51	Rocester	3-1	Stocksbridge Park Steels
52	Romford	2-2	Braintree Town
53	Rothwell Town	2-1	Merthyr Tydfil
54	Shepshed Dynamo	2-3	Burscough
55	Slough Town	5-0	Bishop's Stortford
56	Spalding United	2-0	Sutton Coldfield Town
57	Spennymoor United	3-1	Frickley Athletic
58	Stafford Rangers	3-1	Ossett Town
59	Stalybridge Celtic	4-1	Bedworth United
60	Tiverton Town	3-0	Sittingbourne
61	Trafford	5-1	Farsley Celtic
62	Vauxhall	4-0	Lincoln United
63	Wealdstone	3-3	Weston Super Mare
64	Welling United	0-2	Uxbridge
65	Weymouth	2-1	Sutton United
66	Winsford United	2-4	Congleton Town
67	Wisbech Town	1-2	Carshalton Athletic
68	Witney Town	2-3	Harrow Borough
69	Worcester City	2-0	Mangotsfield United
70	Worthing	1-1	Thame United
71	Yeading	2-1	Bromley

=== Replays ===
Tie	Home team	Score	Away team
2	Rugby United	1-3	Aylesbury United
3	Staines Town	2-1	Baldock Town
11	Whitby Town	2-2	Bishop Auckland
	(Bishop Auckland won 5-4 on penalties)		
13	Whyteleafe	0-1	Bognor Regis Town
16	Accrington Stanley	2-1	Chorley
17	Dulwich Hamlet	1-2	Cinderford Town
19	Tamworth	2-1	Colwyn Bay
24	Bromsgrove Rovers	1-0	Droylsden
27	Oxford City	3-4	Folkestone Invicta
37	Witton Albion	3-2	Harrogate Town
41	Stamford	1-1	Kendal Town
	(Stamford won 3-2 on penalties)		
44	Radcliffe Borough	2-1	Leek Town
46	Hitchin Town	4-1	Newport I O W
52	Braintree Town	2-0	Romford
63	Weston Super Mare	2-0	Wealdstone
70	Thame United	0-0	Worthing
	(Worthing won 4-2 on penalties)		

== 2nd round ==
=== Ties ===
Tie	Home team	Score	Away team
1	Aldershot Town	1-0	Havant & Waterlooville
2	Altrincham	2-2	Bishop Auckland
3	Ashford Town (Kent)	4-2	Weston Super Mare
4	Ashton United	2-2	Bilston Town
5	Barton Rovers	3-2	Uxbridge
6	Bashley	1-7	St Albans City
7	Billericay Town	2-2	Hastings Town
8	Blyth Spartans	3-0	Stafford Rangers
9	Braintree Town	1-1	Rothwell Town
10	Burscough	1-0	Gainsborough Trinity
11	Burton Albion	4-1	Yeading
12	Cambridge City	1-1	Bath City
13	Carshalton Athletic	3-4	Histon
14	Cinderford Town	0-2	Evesham United
15	Congleton Town	3-1	Stamford
16	Emley	5-3	Vauxhall
17	Fisher Athletic London	2-3	Crawley Town
18	Folkestone Invicta	4-0	Worthing
19	Ford United	1-3	Bognor Regis Town
20	Gresley Rovers	4-0	Stocksbridge Park Steels
21	Harlow Town	2-2	Canvey Island
22	Harrow Borough	3-0	Dorchester Town
23	Hendon	1-1	Worcester City
24	Hucknall Town	1-0	Redditch United
25	Hyde United	1-0	Spalding United
26	King's Lynn	2-0	Chesham United
27	Lancaster City	0-1	Bromsgrove Rovers
28	Maidenhead United	1-0	Enfield
29	Margate	2-1	Clevedon Town
30	Marine	2-1	Gateshead
31	Matlock Town	3-1	Gretna
32	Newport County	2-1	Slough Town
33	Northwood	3-1	Purfleet
34	Radcliffe Borough	0-3	Accrington Stanley
35	Runcorn	2-1	Guiseley
36	Staines Town	1-1	Walton & Hersham
37	Stalybridge Celtic	2-0	Witton Albion
38	Tamworth	1-1	Belper Town
39	Tiverton Town	2-1	Aylesbury United
40	Trafford	2-0	Spennymoor United
41	Weymouth	2-0	Hitchin Town
42	Worksop Town	4-2	Atherstone United

=== Replays ===
Tie	Home team	Score	Away team
2	Bishop Auckland	3-1	Altrincham
4	Bilston Town	3-1	Ashton United
7	Hastings Town	1-2	Billericay Town
9	Rothwell Town	2-2	Braintree Town
	(Braintree Town won 4-3 on penalties)		
12	Bath City	1-0	Cambridge City
21	Canvey Island	2-0	Harlow Town
23	Worcester City	2-3	Hendon
36	Walton & Hersham	2-3	Staines Town
38	Belper Town	0-5	Tamworth

== 3rd round ==
The teams from Football Conference entered in this round.

=== Ties ===
Tie	Home team	Score	Away team
1	Aldershot Town	1-5	Stevenage Borough
2	Bilston Town	3-2	Nuneaton Borough
3	Bognor Regis Town	0-2	Billericay Town
4	Braintree Town	1-2	Maidenhead United
5	Burscough	3-3	Morecambe
6	Burton Albion	2-0	Bishop Auckland
7	Canvey Island	5-1	Northwood
8	Chester City	2-0	Doncaster Rovers
9	Congleton Town	2-0	Gresley Rovers
10	Crawley Town	1-2	Ashford Town (Kent)
11	Dagenham & Redbridge	0-1	Weymouth
12	Emley	3-0	Accrington Stanley
13	Evesham United	4-2	Harrow Borough
14	Folkestone Invicta	1-3	King's Lynn
15	Forest Green Rovers	6-1	Barton Rovers
16	Hayes	0-1	Rushden & Diamonds
17	Hendon	1-2	Tiverton Town
18	Hereford United	1-0	Dover Athletic
19	Histon	3-0	Kettering Town
20	Hyde United	0-0	Blyth Spartans
21	Leigh R M I	1-0	Hucknall Town
22	Marine	2-0	Stalybridge Celtic
23	Matlock Town	2-0	Northwich Victoria
24	Runcorn	0-4	Scarborough
25	Southport	3-0	Hednesford Town
26	St Albans City	1-0	Newport County
27	Staines Town	2-2	Kingstonian
28	Tamworth	0-3	Boston United
29	Trafford	1-1	Telford United
30	Woking	1-2	Margate
31	Worksop Town	3-2	Bromsgrove Rovers
32	Yeovil Town	2-1	Bath City

=== Replays ===
Tie	Home team	Score	Away team
5	Morecambe	3-0	Burscough
20	Blyth Spartans	2-1	Hyde United
27	Kingstonian	2-0	Staines Town
29	Telford United	7-1	Trafford

== 4th round ==
=== Ties ===
Tie	Home team	Score	Away team
1	Bilston Town	0-1	Canvey Island
2	Blyth Spartans	2-1	Maidenhead United
3	Chester City	3-2	St Albans City
4	Emley	2-4	Yeovil Town
5	Evesham United	0-0	Morecambe
6	Hereford United	0-0	Leigh R M I
7	Histon	0-3	Billericay Town
8	King's Lynn	1-2	Telford United
9	Kingstonian	0-1	Southport
10	Marine	0-6	Rushden & Diamonds
11	Matlock Town	2-2	Forest Green Rovers
12	Scarborough	0-1	Burton Albion
13	Stevenage Borough	2-1	Margate
14	Tiverton Town	2-1	Boston United
15	Weymouth	3-1	Ashford Town (Kent)
16	Worksop Town	6-2	Congleton Town

=== Replays ===
Tie	Home team	Score	Away team
5	Morecambe	4-1	Evesham United
6	Leigh R M I	1-2	Hereford United
11	Forest Green Rovers	3-1	Matlock Town

== 5th round ==
=== Ties ===
Tie	Home team	Score	Away team
1	Billericay Town	2-3	Telford United
2	Burton Albion	2-1	Yeovil Town
3	Canvey Island	1-1	Stevenage Borough
4	Chester City	4-2	Blyth Spartans
5	Forest Green Rovers	2-0	Rushden & Diamonds
6	Morecambe	0-0	Hereford United
7	Tiverton Town	1-2	Worksop Town
8	Weymouth	1-2	Southport

=== Replays ===
Tie	Home team	Score	Away team
3	Stevenage Borough	0-0	Canvey Island
	(Canvey Island won 4-2 on penalties)		
6	Hereford United	1-1	Morecambe
	(Hereford United won 3-1 on penalties)		

== Quarter finals ==
=== Ties ===
Tie	Home team	Score	Away team
1	Canvey Island	1-0	Telford United
2	Chester City	1-0	Southport
3	Forest Green Rovers	2-1	Worksop Town
4	Hereford United	1-0	Burton Albion

== Semi finals ==
=== First leg ===
Tie	Home team	Score	Away team
1	Canvey Island	2-0	Chester City
2	Forest Green Rovers	2-2	Hereford United

=== Second leg ===
Tie	Home team	Score	Away team	Aggregate
1	Chester City	0-2	Canvey Island	0-4
2	Hereford United	1-4	Forest Green Rovers	6-3

== Final ==
=== Tie ===
Home team	Score	Away team
Canvey Island	1-0	Forest Green Rovers
