= Brooks Mileson =

British businessman (1947–2008)

- Born: Brooks John Joseph Mileson; 13 November 1947; Sunderland, England
- Died: 3 November 2008 (aged 60); Carlisle, England
- Occupations: Businessman; philanthropist

Brooks John Joseph Mileson (13 November 1947 – 3 November 2008) was an English businessman and the owner of now dissolved professional football club Gretna as well as being a philanthropist to 70 non-League clubs.

== Early life ==
The eldest son of parents who were both members of the Salvation Army, Mileson and his four siblings were born in Pennywell, an estate in Sunderland, England. All the children were committed Christians who were given a good education, brought up in a poor household. Told he would never make the sports team after breaking his back in a quarry aged 11, Mileson took up running. He won the bronze medal in the 1967 English cross country junior championships – then immediately stopped: "It was the happiest day of my life. I hated every minute of running, but I had something to prove."

== Business ==
Starting out from school and working in the construction industry. After the then Durham-based Mileson was made redundant in 1982, he set up his first construction firm, before branching out into insurance. Although estimates of his wealth varied, he was said to have sold two companies for £17m and £48.6m, with the highest tabloid estimates at over £75 million, according to a profile in The Sun.

Towards the end of his tenure at Gretna, Mileson was reported to be heavily in debt, with his personal bank account reported to be overdrawn by almost £500,000. Mileson was posthumously declared bankrupt in February 2010, after a businessman who was owed £1.85 million by Mileson made an application to Carlisle County Court.

== Sport ==
Mileson was a devotee of grassroots football, and made donations to several football trusts, including Carlisle's United Trust, Dundee United's Arab Trust, Ayr United's Honest Men Trust, Dundee's Dee4life Trust and Berwick Rangers's Supporters Trust. Mileson was made an honorary vice president of the Stockport County Supporters' Trust for the support and guidance he provided during their takeover of the club. He was also the president of Whitby Town, and sponsor of the Northern League.

Mileson was a supporter of Carlisle United and made an unsuccessful attempt to purchase the club.

Gretna were admitted to the Scottish Football League in 2002 in place of Airdrie. Mileson took control of the club and invested heavily in the team, and they were promoted from the Scottish Third Division to the Scottish Premier League in three consecutive seasons. Gretna also reached the 2006 Scottish Cup Final as a Second Division club, only losing to Hearts in a penalty shoot-out.

Mileson had been in poor health from his many years as a chain smoker, subsequently undergoing two stomach operations. He also suffered from chronic fatigue syndrome (CFS). He was admitted to hospital once again on 12 February 2008, suffering from a brain infection. After this event, his financial support for Gretna was withdrawn, bankrupting the club and leaving Gretna without a football team to play at Raydale Park. A new club called Gretna 2008 was founded in its place.

Mileson was not universally popular within Scottish football. St Johnstone chairman Geoff Brown described Mileson's ownership of Gretna as an "ego trip", which had experienced a "day of reckoning" when the club went out of business.

== Death ==
Mileson was found unconscious on his land at his home in the village of Blackford on the morning of 3 November 2008. He was taken to the Cumberland Infirmary in Carlisle, where he died a few hours after arrival. A coroner recorded a verdict of accidental death, caused by Mileson suffering a heart attack and then falling into a garden pond.
