= Raydale Park =

Football stadium in Gretna, Scotland

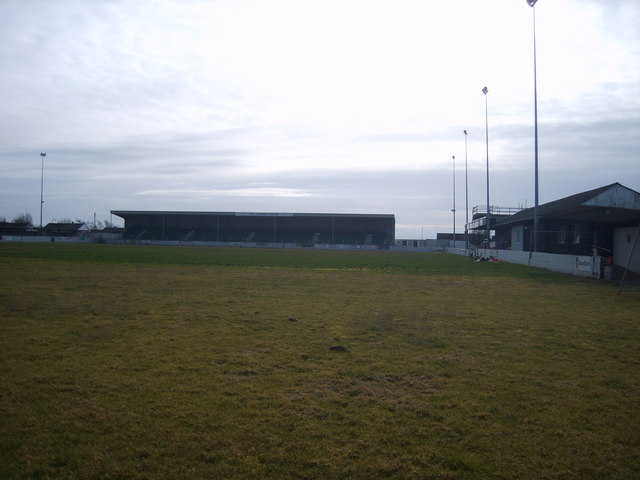
- Raydale Park in 2009

- Location within Dumfries and Galloway
- Location: Dominion Road, Gretna, DG16 5AP
- Coordinates: 54°59′35.57″N 3°04′18.91″W
- Owner: Raydale Community Partnership
- Capacity: 1,030 (138 seated)
- Surface: Artificial turf (2021–)

Construction
- Opened: 1946

Tenants
- Gretna (1946–2008); Gretna 2008 (2009–present)

Raydale Park is a football stadium in Gretna, Scotland. It is home to Lowland League side Gretna 2008 and now has a capacity of 1,030. Raydale formerly served as the home ground of Gretna until the club resigned from the Scottish Football League in 2008.

== History ==
Gretna played their home games at Raydale during their existence in English non-League football and then during their period in the Scottish Football League.

However, most of their home matches in the 2007–08 season were played at Fir Park, in Motherwell because Raydale did not meet SPL requirements. This meant a 150-mile round trip for fans from the Gretna area. Gretna also played a UEFA Cup match (a 1–5 defeat to Derry City) at Fir Park because Raydale was inadequate for that competition.

Gretna had planned to leave Raydale Park and move to an eco-stadium in Gretna Green. These plans never came to fruition as the club suffered severe financial problems during the 2007–08 season.

These financial problems were expected to lead to the sale of the ground for a use other than football. Supporters of Gretna F.C. formed Gretna 2008, a new club that started by playing their home matches at the Everholm Stadium in Annan. Dumfries and Galloway Council ruled out bidding for the stadium, which they wanted to preserve for recreational use. It was reported by the BBC that it was likely that Raydale would be sold to developers "outside football", but the new buyers, Sawtry (IoM) allowed Gretna 2008 to move into Raydale in May 2009.

In May 2011, Sawtry agreed to sell the ground, along with the social club and market on-site, to the Raydale Community Partnership, a group made up of members from a community council and from Gretna 2008. The £250,000 deal was finalised on 28 May 2011.

An artificial surface was installed during the summer of 2021.

== Greyhound racing ==
A greyhound racing track was constructed around the pitch just after World War II. Racing took place on Wednesday at 7:30 pm and consisted of five-dog races (instead of the normal six-dog racing) over 300 and 480 yards. Racing continued for forty years until Gretna F.C. needed to increase the size of the pitch in 1985. The greyhound operation owned by James Norman and sons constructed and moved to a new purpose-built track called Halcrow Stadium to the west of Gretna.

== Gallery ==
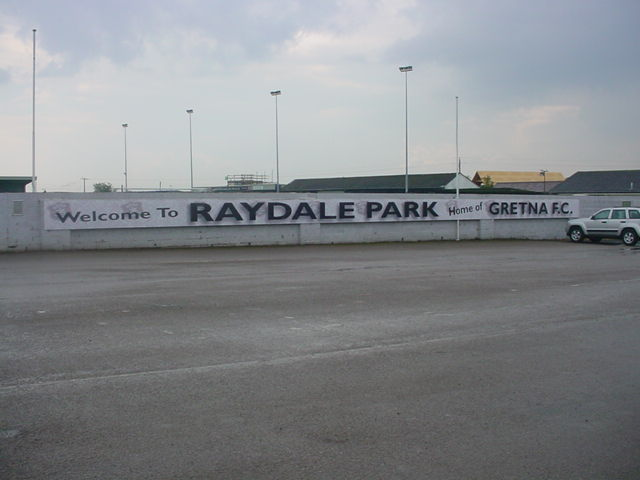
Raydale Park (2006)

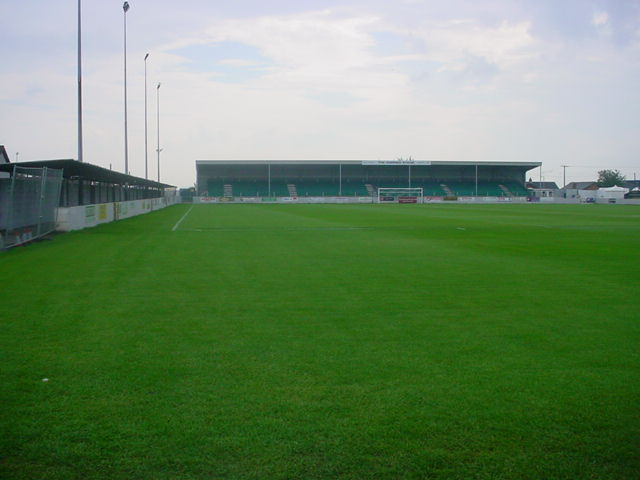
Raydale Park (2006)

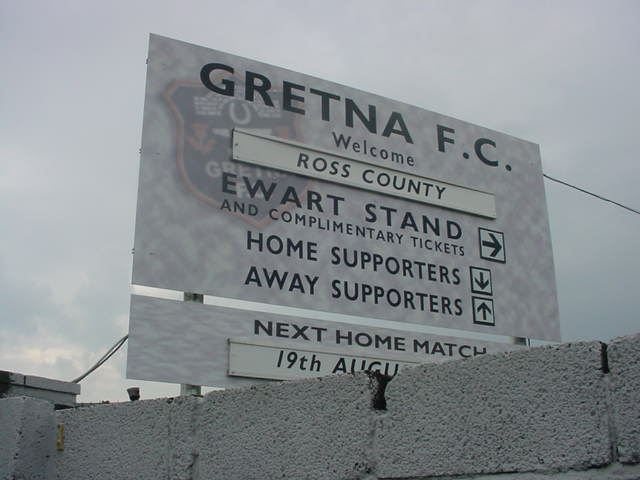
Raydale Park (2006)

== See also ==
- Stadium relocations in Scottish football
