= List of Macclesfield Town F.C. seasons =

Macclesfield Football Club is an English football club based in Macclesfield, Cheshire. The club played in the Football League from 1996–97 until relegation to the Conference Premier was confirmed on 28 April 2012. The club was formed in 1874 and the team play their home games at the 6,355 capacity Moss Rose stadium.

== Key ==
**Key to league record**

- Level = Level of the league in the current league system
- Pld = Games played
- W = Games won
- D = Games drawn
- L = Games lost
- GF = Goals for
- GA = Goals against
- GD = Goals difference
- Pts = Points
- Position = Position in the final league table
- Top scorer and number of goals scored shown in bold when he was also top scorer for the division. Number of goals includes goals scored in play-offs.

**Key to cup records**

- Res = Final reached round
- Rec = Final club record in the form of wins-draws-losses
- PR = Preliminary round
- QR1 (2, etc.) = Qualifying Cup rounds
- G = Group stage
- R1 (2, etc.) = Proper Cup rounds
- QF = Quarter-finalists
- SF = Semi-finalists
- F = Finalists
- A (QF, SF, F) = Area quarter-, semi-, finalists
- W = Winners

== Seasons ==
The Silkmen spent much of the 20th century in the Cheshire County League before becoming founder members of the Northern Premier League in 1968. They were NPL champions in its first two seasons, beating Wigan Athletic to the title on both occasions. They were champions again in 1986–87, earning promotion to the Football Conference. They were Conference champions in 1994-95 but failed to gain election to the Football League. Two years later they were champions again and gained promotion in successive years to spend 1998–99 in Division Two before falling back to the fourth tier of English football (Division Three/League Two) and then being relegated to the conference in 2012.

Year	League														Cup competitions						Manager
Year	Division	Lvl	Pld	W	D	L	GF	GA	GD	Pts	Position	Leading league scorer		Average (Note: Average home attendance = for league games only) attendance	FA Cup		EFL Cup		EFL Trophy FA Trophy		Manager
Year	Division	Lvl	Pld	W	D	L	GF	GA	GD	Pts	Position	Name	Goals	Average attendance	Res	Rec	Res	Rec	Res	Rec	Manager
Club changed name to Macclesfield Town.
1966–67	**Cheshire County League**		42	24	8	10	78	47	+31	56	**5th of 22**				QR4	3–2–1					Albert Leake
1967–68	**Cheshire County League**		42	28	10	4	96	39	+57	66	**1st of 22**				R3	6–2–1					Albert Leake
Northern Premier League created. Club transferred to the newly created league.
1968–69	**Northern Premier League**	5	38	27	6	5	82	38	+44	60	**1st of 20**				R1	1–0–1					Frank Beaumont
1969–70	**Northern Premier League**	5	38	22	8	8	72	41	+31	52	**1st of 20**				R1	1–1–1			W	6–2–0	Frank Beaumont
1970–71	**Northern Premier League**	5	42	23	10	9	84	45	+39	56	**5th of 22**				R1	0–0–1			QF	3–1–1	Frank Beaumont
1971–72	**Northern Premier League**	5	46	18	15	13	61	50	+11	51	**6th of 24**				QR4	0–0–1			QF	3–1–1	Frank Beaumont
1972–73	**Northern Premier League**	5	46	16	16	14	58	47	+11	48	**10th of 24**				QR4	3–0–1			R1	0–0–1	Billy Haydock
1973–74	**Northern Premier League**	5	46	18	15	13	48	47	+1	51	**8th of 24**				QR4	3–2–1			SF	4–3–1	Billy Haydock; Eddie Brown
1974–75	**Northern Premier League**	5	46	11	14	21	46	62	-16	36	**17th of 24**				QR2	1–0–1			R1	0–0–1	Eddie Brown; Willie Stevenson; John Collins
1975–76	**Northern Premier League**	5	46	15	12	19	50	64	-14	42	**15th of 24**				R1	4–1–1			R1	0–0–1	John Collins
1976–77	**Northern Premier League**	5	44	8	15	21	41	68	-27	31	**19th of 23**				QR1	0–1–1			R2	2–0–1	David Connor
1977–78	**Northern Premier League**	5	46	12	9	25	60	92	-32	33	**22nd of 24**				QR1	0–0–1			QR3	0–0–1	David Connor; Derek Partridge
1978–79	**Northern Premier League**	5	44	8	10	26	40	92	-52	26	**23rd of 23**				PR	0–0–1			QR3	0–1–1	Phil Staley
1978–79	**Northern Premier League**	5	Level of the league decreased after the Alliance Premier League creation.												PR	0–0–1			QR3	0–1–1	Phil Staley
1979–80	**Northern Premier League**	6	42	18	11	13	67	53	+14	47	**8th of 22**				QR2	2–1–1			R1	3–0–1	Phil Staley
1980–81	**Northern Premier League**	6	42	13	13	16	52	69	-17	39	**13th of 22**				QR1	0–0–1			QR1	0–0–1	
1981–82	**Northern Premier League**	6	42	17	9	16	67	58	+9	43	**10th of 22**				PR	0–0–1			QR1	0–0–1	Brian Booth
1982–83	**Northern Premier League**	6	42	24	8	10	71	49	+22	80	**5th of 22**				R1	4–0–1			QR1	0–0–1	Brian Booth
1983–84	**Northern Premier League**	6	42	18	10	14	65	55	+10	64	**6th of 22**				R1	4–2–1			QR1	0–0–1	Brian Booth
1984–85	**Northern Premier League**	6	42	23	13	6	67	39	+28	82	**2rd of 22**				R1	1–0–1			QR3	2–0–1	Brian Booth
1985–86	**Northern Premier League**	6	42	17	8	17	67	65	+2	59	**9th of 22**				R1	1–0–1			R2	1–1–1	Neil Griffiths; Peter Wragg
1986–87	**Northern Premier League**	6	42	26	10	6	80	47	+33	88	**1st of 22**; Promoted				QR4	0–0–1			QR3	0–1–1	Peter Wragg
1987–88	**Football**; **Conference**	5	42	18	9	15	64	62	+2	63	**11th of 22**			1,200	R3	6–2–1			QF	3–0–1	Peter Wragg
1988–89	**Football**; **Conference**	5	40	17	10	13	63	57	+6	61	**7th of 21**			1,433	QR4	0–1–1			F	5–2–1	Peter Wragg
1989–90	**Football**; **Conference**	5	42	17	15	10	56	41	+15	66	**4th of 22**			1,422	R1	0–1–1			R2	1–1–1	Peter Wragg
1990–91	**Football**; **Conference**	5	42	17	12	13	63	52	+11	63	**7th of 22**			1,001	QR4	0–1–1			R1	0–0–1	Peter Wragg
1991–92	**Football**; **Conference**	5	42	13	13	16	50	50	0	52	**13th of 22**			756	QR2	1–0–1			SF	4–2–1	Peter Wragg
1992–93	**Football**; **Conference**	5	42	12	13	17	40	50	-10	49	**18th of 22**			658	R2	4–4–1			R1	0–1–1	Peter Wragg
1993–94	**Football**; **Conference**	5	42	16	11	15	48	49	-1	59	**7th of 22**			853	R2	2–0–1			R3	2–2–1	Sammy McIlroy
1994–95	**Football**; **Conference**	5	42	24	8	10	70	40	+30	80	**1st of 22**			1,260	QR4	0–1–1			QF	3–0–1	Sammy McIlroy
1994–95	**Football**; **Conference**	5	Not promoted due to stadium safety requirements.												QR4	0–1–1			QF	3–0–1	Sammy McIlroy
1995–96	**Football**; **Conference**	5	42	22	9	11	66	49	+17	75	**4th of 22**			1,264	QR4	0–0–1			W	6–1–0	Sammy McIlroy
1996–97	**Football**; **Conference**	5	42	27	9	6	80	30	+50	90	**1st of 22**; Promoted	Steve Wood	15	1,407	R1	0–0–1			R1	0–0–1	Sammy McIlroy
1997-98	**Football League**; **Third Division**	4	46	23	13	10	63	44	+19	82	**2nd of 24**; Promoted	Steve Wood	13	2,905	R2	1–0–1	R1	0–1–1	R2	0–0–1	Sammy McIlroy
1998-99	**Football League**; **Second Division**	3	46	11	10	25	43	63	-20	43	**24th of 24**; Relegated	Steve Wood	5	3,311	R3	1–2–1	R2	1–0–3	R1	0–0–1	Sammy McIlroy
**1999-00**	**Football League**; **Third Division**	4	46	18	11	17	66	61	+5	65	**13th of 24**	Richie Barker	16	2,304	R1	0–1–1	R1	0–1–1	R2	0–0–1	Sammy McIlroy; Peter Davenport
2000–01	**Football League**; **Third Division**	4	46	14	14	18	51	62	−11	56	**14th of 24**	Lee Glover; Damien Whitehead	8	2,064	R1	0–0–1	R2	1–0–3	R2	0–0–1	Peter Davenport; Gil Prescott
2001–02	**Football League**; **Third Division**	4	46	15	13	18	41	52	−11	58	**13th of 24**	Lee Glover	9	2,123	R3	1–2–1	R1	0–0–1	R2	0–0–1	Gil Prescott; David Moss
2002–03	**Football League**; **Third Division**	4	46	14	12	20	57	63	−6	54	**16th of 24**	Kyle Lightbourne; Matthew Tipton; Danny Whitaker	10	2,110	R3	2–0–1	R2	1–0–1	R2	0–0–1	David Moss
2003–04	**Football League**; **Third Division**	4	46	13	13	20	54	69	−15	52	**20th of 24**	Matthew Tipton	16	2,385	R3	1–2–1	R1	0–0–1	R1	0–0–1	David Moss; John Askey; Brian Horton
Football League divisions renamed.
2004–05	**Football League**; **Two**	4	46	22	9	15	60	49	+11	75	**5th of 24**	Jon Parkin	22	2,272	R2	1–1–1	R1	0–0–1	R3	2–0–1	Brian Horton
2004–05	**Football League**; **Two**	4	Lost in the play-off semifinal.												R2	1–1–1	R1	0–0–1	R3	2–0–1	Brian Horton
2005–06	**Football League**; **Two**	4	46	12	18	16	60	71	−11	54	**17th of 24**	Clyde Wijnhard	8	2,274	R1	0–1–1	R2	1–0–1	SF	4–0–1	Brian Horton
**2006–07**	**Football League**; **Two**	4	46	12	12	22	55	77	−22	48	**22nd of 24**	Kevin McIntyre	9	2,427	R3	2–1–1	R1	0–0–1	R1	0–0–1	Brian Horton; Paul Ince
2007–08	**Football League**; **Two**	4	46	11	17	18	47	64	−17	50	**19th of 24**	Francis Green	11	2,297	R1	0–0–1	R1	0–0–1	R2	1–0–1	Ian Brightwell; Keith Alexander
2008–09	**Football League**; **Two**	4	46	13	8	25	45	77	−32	47	**20th of 24**	Gareth Evans	12	1,897	R3	2–0–1	R2	1–1–0	R1	0–0–1	Keith Alexander
2009–10	**Football League**; **Two**	4	46	12	18	16	49	58	−9	54	**19th of 24**	Emile Sinclair; Ricky Sappleton	7	1,887	R1	0–0–1	R1	0–0–1	R2	0–0–1	Keith Alexander; Gary Simpson
**2010–11**	**Football League**; **Two**	4	46	14	13	19	59	73	−14	55	**15th of 24**	Tyrone Barnett	13	1,807	R2	0–2–1	R1	0–0–1	R2	1–0–1	Gary Simpson
**2011–12**	**Football League**; **Two**	4	46	8	13	25	39	64	−25	37	**24th of 24**; Relegated	Ben Tomlinson; George Donnelly	6	2,227	R3	2–2–1	R2	1–0–1	R2	0–0–1	Gary Simpson; Brian Horton
2012–13	**Conference**; **National**	5	46	17	12	17	65	70	−5	63	**11th of 24**	Matthew Barnes-Homer	18	1,670	R4	4–1–1			R1	0–0–1	Steve King; John Askey
2013–14	**Conference**; **National**	5	46	18	7	21	62	63	−1	61	**15th of 24**	Scott Boden	18	1,512	R3	3–1–1			R1	0–0–1	John Askey
2014–15	**Conference**; **National**	5	46	21	15	10	60	46	+14	78	**6th of 24**	Waide Fairhurst	10	1,773	QR4	0–1–1			R1	0–0–1	John Askey
Fifth and sixth tier divisions renamed.
2015–16	**National**; **League**	5	46	19	9	18	60	48	+12	66	**10th of 24**	Kristian Dennis	22	1,648	R1	1–0–1			R3	2–2–1	John Askey
2016–17	**National**; **League**	5	46	20	8	18	64	57	+7	68	**9th of 24**	Chris Holroyd	13	1,456	R2	2–1–1			F	5–3–1	John Askey
2017–18	**National**; **League**	5	46	27	11	8	67	46	+21	92	**1st of 24**; Promoted	Scott Wilson	14	1,455	R1	1–0–1			R1	0–0–1	John Askey
**2018–19**	**EFL League Two**	4	46	10	14	22	48	74	−26	44	**22nd of 24**	Scott Wilson	11	2,389	R1	0-0-1	R3	2-0-1	R2	1-2-1	Mark Yates; Sol Campbell
**2019–20**	**EFL League Two**	4	37	7	15	15	32	47	−15	19	**24th of 24**; Relegated	Joe Ironside	6	1,998	R1	0-0-1	R2	0-2-0	GS	1-0-1	Sol Campbell; Daryl McMahon; Mark Kennedy
2020–21	**National League**	5	0	0	0	0	0	0	0	0											Tim Flowers
Club was expelled from the National League on 29 September 2020. At the time of their expulsion they had played no matches. New club **Macclesfield** was formed and joined North West Counties Football League for the next season.
