= Phil Power =

English footballer (born 1967)

Personal information
- Full name: Philip Damian Power
- Date of birth: 25 July 1967 (age 59)
- Place of birth: Salford, England
- Height: 5 ft 7 in (1.70 m)
- Position: Forward

Senior career*
Years	Team	Apps	(Gls)
1983–1984	Northwich Victoria	29	(3)
1984–1985	Witton Albion	?	(?)
1985–1987	Crewe Alexandra	27	(3)
1987–1988	Horwich RMI	?	(?)
1988	Sliema Wanderers	?	(?)
1988–1990	Chorley	55	(27)
1991–1992	Barrow	18	(1)
1992–1993	Stalybridge Celtic	31	(9)
1993–1998	Macclesfield Town	161	(58)
1998–2000	Altrincham	68	(12)
2001	Radcliffe Borough	4	(1)
2004–2005	Bacup Borough	?	(?)
2005–2006	FC United of Manchester	22	(6)

Managerial career
- 2013–2014: Salford City
- 2014–2015: Salford City
- * Club domestic league appearances and goals

Philip Damian Power (born 25 July 1967) is an English football manager and former player who played in the Football League, as a forward. He was most recently manager of Salford City, and was featured in the BBC documentary series, Class of '92: Out of Their League.

== Playing career ==
While playing for Northwich Victoria, he played in the 1984 FA Trophy Final at Wembley Stadium, picking up a winners medal.

He moved to Sliema Wanderers in 1988 and helped them finish 2nd in the Maltese Premier League. He moved to back to England before they played their UEFA Cup first round tie against Victoria București.

During his time with Chorley, he almost signed for AFC Bournemouth, then managed by Harry Redknapp, before a leg injury kept him out of action for almost two years.

During his career, he was managed by famous names such as Dario Gradi at Crewe Alexandra, and former Manchester United and Northern Ireland winger Sammy McIlroy at Macclesfield Town, where he again won the FA Trophy in 1996, against his former club Northwich Victoria.

== Honours ==
=== Player ===
Northwich Victoria

- FA Trophy: 1983–84

Macclesfield Town

- FA Trophy: 1995–96
- Football Conference: 1994–95, 1996–97
