= Steve Wood (footballer, born June 1963) =

English footballer

Personal information
- Date of birth: 23 June 1963 (age 63)
- Place of birth: Oldham, England
- Position: Midfielder

Senior career*
Years	Team	Apps	(Gls)
1981–1989	Chadderton		
1989–1991	Mossley	91	(10)
1991–1992	Droylsden		
1992	Stalybridge Celtic	4	(1)
1992–1993	Ashton United		
1996–2001	Macclesfield Town	151	(20)
2001–2002	Stalybridge Celtic	38	(0)
- * Club domestic league appearances and goals

Steve Wood (born 23 June 1963) is an English former footballer who played in The Football League for Macclesfield Town.

== Career ==
Wood started his career at Chadderton, followed by short stints at Mossley, Droylsden, Stalybridge Celtic and Ashton United before joining Macclesfield Town at the beginning of the 1993–94 season, making his debut in a 5–1 defeat at Bath. With Macclesfield he won the Conference League Cup in 1994, the FA Trophy in 1996, and the Football Conference in 1995 and 1997. After the club's promotion to the Football League Wood signed his first professional contract. Wood stayed with the club until 2001, after which he returned to Stalybridge Celtic, where he played for one season before retiring.
