= Salford City F.C. =

Football club in Greater Manchester, England

Coordinates: 53°30′48″N 2°16′36″W

- Crest used since 2026
- Full name: Salford City Football Club
- Nickname: The Ammies
- Founded: 1940; 86 years ago (as "Salford Central")
- Ground: Moor Lane
- Capacity: 5,108 (2,246 seated)
- Owner: Project 92 Limited
- Chairman: Declan Kelly and Lord Mervyn Davies
- Manager: Peter Cklamovski
- League: EFL League Two
- 2025–26: EFL League Two, 4th of 24
- Website: salfordcityfc.co.uk
Home colours	Away colours	Third colours

Salford City Football Club is a professional association football club based in Salford, Greater Manchester, England. The club competes in EFL League Two, the fourth tier of the English football league system.

Founded as Salford Central in 1940, the club initially competed in local amateur football leagues before being admitted to the Manchester League in 1963. During the 1970s, the club achieved success in regional competitions, winning the Lancashire Amateur Cup in 1971, 1973, and 1975, and the Manchester Premier Cup in 1978 and 1979. In 1980, Salford joined the Cheshire County League, which merged with the North West Counties Football League (NWCFL) in 1982. The club adopted the name Salford City in 1989 and gained promotion to the Northern Premier League (NPL) in 2008. In the club's first season at that level, it avoided relegation by securing its league status on the final day of the season.

In 2014, the club was acquired by former Manchester United players Nicky Butt, Ryan Giggs, Gary Neville, Phil Neville, and Paul Scholes, alongside Singaporean businessman Peter Lim. David Beckham subsequently acquired a 10% stake in the club from Lim in 2019. In August 2024, Gary Neville purchased Lim's remaining shareholding. On 8 May 2025, the club announced that it had been acquired by a new ownership group led by Beckham and Neville, which also included US businessman Declan Kelly and Mervyn Davies, Baron Davies of Abersoch.

Salford City play their home matches at Moor Lane, a stadium that underwent extensive redevelopment between 2016 and 2017. The ground is currently known as the AIG Stadium under a sponsorship agreement. Throughout much of the club's history, the team has worn tangerine shirts and black shorts, although the club played in red shirts and white shorts from 2014 until 2026. The club's nickname, "The Ammies", derives from its former name, Salford Amateurs, which was used from the early 1960s until the early 1970s. The club's anthem is "Dirty Old Town", written by Salford-born songwriter Ewan MacColl and popularised by The Pogues.

== History ==
=== The Ammies in amateur football (1940–1982) ===
The club was founded in 1940 as Salford Central, named after a Salford church where the club was founded. The club competed in local leagues until 1963, when they were promoted to the Manchester Football League and changed the club name to Salford Amateurs. Now nicknamed "The Ammies", Salford won the Lancashire County Football Association (LFA) Amateur Cup for the first time in 1971, beating Aintree Villa 4–0 at Old Trafford, with all four goals arriving in extra time. They won a second LFA Amateur Cup in 1973, defeating Langton 3–1 at Old Trafford. and won a third in 1975 by beating Waterloo Dock 2–1 at Maine Road. Salford came close to a fourth cup success in 1977, reaching the semi-finals before losing to Blackpool Rangers.

Further success arrived for Salford later in the decade in the form of the Manchester Premier Cup, which the club lifted in 1978 and 1979. The club changed their name once more, dropping the Amateurs moniker to become known simply as Salford, and moved into their current home Moor Lane in 1978. In the 1980–81 season, Salford reached the fourth round of the FA Vase, losing 2–0 to eventual winners Whickham. Following restoration of the ground and a merger with Anson Villa, Salford entered the Cheshire County League in the same season, finishing 15th and 16th in Division 2, before the league amalgamated with the Lancashire Combination to form the North West Counties Football League (NWCFL).

=== North West Counties League (1982–2008) ===
Salford started off in the second division of the NWCFL, and were promoted to the first division in 1986 despite finishing 18th, due to a reshuffling of the pyramid. The club would adopt its current name of Salford City in 1989 and, the following season, they returned to the final of the Manchester Premier Cup, losing to Curzon Ashton. Later in 1990, they entered the FA Cup for the first time to mark the club's 50th anniversary, losing 3–0 to Warrington Town. Brief highlights of the game were included in the BBC's coverage of the buildup to the 1991 FA Cup final. Salford would later be relegated out of Division One into Division Two at the end of the 1990–91 season, though a league restructuring saw them immediately promoted the following season. The 2001–02 saw Salford narrowly miss out on major success; despite amassing 97 points, they missed out on promotion to Prescot Cables on goal difference, and also made another appearance in the final of the Manchester Premier Cup in 2002, but lost 3–1 to Ashton United at Boundary Park. Manager Andy Brown resigned in March of the next season, with their title challenge collapsing following a post-Christmas run of one win in 10, culminating in a 4–0 defeat to Skelmersdale United.

In the 2003–04 season, with the team 16 points behind Mossley despite being again considered amongst the favourites for the league, the club sacked Chris Wilcock and replaced him with former player Mark Molyneaux. He lasted less than a year before resigning, citing financial restrictions placed on him by the club. He was replaced by Darren Lyons. In the 2004–05 season, Salford reached the third round of the FA Vase before losing 2–1 to West Allotment Celtic In March, they appointed John Foster as manager to replace Darren Lyons, with his first game being a 5–1 victory over Atherton Collieries. At the end of the season, Foster left his role as manager, and was replaced by Irlam manager Gary Fellows. Fellows began his reign with a 4–2 win against Glossop North End, followed by a 4–2 loss to title favourites Cammell Laird.

In January 2006, Salford pulled off a coup by signing former Manchester United starlet Ben Thornley, with the hopes of boosting matchday attendance. Having defeated Ramsbottom United 2–1, Salford reached the NWCFL League Challenge Cup semi-finals for the first time, where they overcome a first leg loss to beat Oldham Town 2–1 over two legs. In May, Salford won the final, overcoming holders Cammell Laird 3–2 in the final; goals from Jamie Baguley, Jon Robinson and Callum Higginbottom gave Salford a 3–0 lead which eventually won Salford the trophy, the first time they had achieved silverware in their 24 years as a semi-professional team. However, the club would miss out on promotion on the last day of the season, with a 1–0 loss to Cammell Laird dropping them to fifth, with restructuring of the league meaning only three teams would be promoted.

==== 2006 to 2008: Push for promotion ====
In June, local businessman and former Salford player Darren Quick became the new Salford chairman, taking over from Ged Carter, and was being quoted as saying that he was targeting Conference football within six years, while promising Fellows a bigger budget to help the club fulfil their potential. The season began with a 3–1 home loss to Curzon Ashton, despite having gone a goal up after 15 minutes, but followed with five wins on the bounce to move into third in the table. On 3 October, Salford played a home league game against F.C. United of Manchester at The Willows, previous home of rugby league side Salford City Reds; Salford won the game 2–1 in front of a crowd of 4,058, leaving Fellows to be confident of a title challenge. After consecutively beating Stone Dominoes and Squires Gate 5–0 and 4–0 respectively, Salford moved level on points with FC United in December, and then became sole league-leaders at Christmas having picked up four points from games against Newcastle Town and Maine Road, with Fellows restating his belief the club could go on to win the league.

In the 2007–08 season, Salford were again amongst the favourites for promotion, and began their campaign with back-to-back 2–1 victories against Formby and Winsford United. They went unbeaten in nine games before suffering a 1–0 defeat to Silsden in late October. They ended their campaign by defeating league champions Trafford 3–0 followed two days later by a 2–1 win against Runcorn Linnets, meaning the club finished second in Division One of the North West Counties League, and after weeks of uncertainty, the FA confirmed that the club had been promoted to Division One North of the NPL, the eighth tier of the English football league system and what would be the highest level the club had ever played at. Salford would also enter the FA Vase for the final time in this season, achieving their joint-best run after beating Hallam 3–0, before suffering a surprise 3–1 defeat to Coventry Sphinx.

=== The Great Escape (2008–2009) ===
The club suffered a difficult start in the NPL, losing six of their first seven matches, including shipping four goals in three consecutive games to Clitheroe, Mossley, and Bamber Bridge, a run of form which resulted in Fellows being relieved of his managerial duties in October 2008. In the two fixtures following his departure, the team picked up their second point of the season against Colwyn Bay, followed by a victory in the FA Trophy preliminary stage against Gresley Rovers. Salford moved to appoint former Bridlington Town and Stockport Sports manager Ashley Berry as the new manager, with Greg Challender as his assistant, and he quickly made experienced midfielder Neil Redfearn their first signing. His first game in charge did not bring about a change in fortunes, losing 6–2 at home to Trafford. Berry's first win in charge, and the club's first league win of the season, came on 15 November, when they defeated Mossley despite going behind in the 19th minute.

After only two months and with results still not improving, Berry was sacked, with chairman Darren Quick citing the club's desperation to not be relegated after only one season in the division. Berry was replaced the following month by former Flixton manager Paul Wright; however, Salford were unaware of a pre-existing suspension he had received from the Football Association for a "serious touchline breach", meaning Wright was unable to start work until March and thus forcing the club to appoint their fourth manager of the season, Neil Hall, who deputised for the first two months of 2009. By the time Wright took up his position, Salford were languishing at the bottom of the league, having achieved one win and a total of eight points from their first 26 games, leaving them 15 points adrift from safety.

A second win of the season finally came in March, when new signing Steve Foster scored all five goals in a 5–3 away win at Lancaster City. This was followed three days later by defeat, an 8–1 shellacking from Wakefield, a game where Salford went into the break level before conceding seven second-half goals. Their first victory of the season at Moor Lane came at the end of March, a 1–0 win against Bamber Bridge also marking Salford's first clean sheet of the season, and meant they had more than halved the points deficit to their closest relegation rival. The club's form continued to improve, and they achieved an important 3–1 victory over relegation rivals Rossendale United at the beginning of April, a game dubbed "The Game of Death". Over the Easter weekend, Salford picked up a further four points with a 2–2 draw with Chorley followed by a 3–1 win over Warrington Town, meaning they now sat only four points behind Rossendale with a game in hand. Salford won their game in hand against Harrogate Railway Athletic, but lost 4–1 to Skelmersdale United, meaning the relegation battle would be decided in the last round of fixtures.

Survival was secured on the final day of the season with a 5–2 win away at Garforth Town. It was a turnaround in fortunes dubbed "The Great Escape"; the club had been bottom of the table continuously since their third game of the season, were relying on Rossendale losing to Mossley, and were losing their own game 1–0 at half-time.

Matchday	1	2	3	4	5	6	7	8	9	10	11	12	13	14	15	16	17	18	19	20	21	22	23	24	25	26	27	28	29	30	31	32	33	34	35	36	37	38	39	40
Ground	A	H	H	A	H	A	A	A	A	H	A	H	A	H	H	H	H	A	H	H	H	H	H	H	A	H	A	A	A	A	A	H	A	H	A	A	H	H	A	A
Result	L	D	L	L	L	L	L	D	L	L	L	L	W	D	L	L	L	L	L	D	L	L	D	L	L	L	W	L	L	W	W	L	W	W	W	D	W	W	L	W
Position	17	20	21	21	21	21	21	21	21	21	21	21	21	21	21	21	21	21	21	21	21	21	21	21	21	21	21	21	21	21	21	21	21	21	21	21	21	21	21	20

Source: Statto.com
A = Away; H = Home; W = Win; D = Draw; L = Loss

=== Northern Premier League (2009–2014) ===
The 2009–10 season saw strong performances in the FA Cup and the FA Trophy, with the club reaching the third qualification stage of both competitions, eventually losing in extra time to Blyth Spartans in the FA Cup in October, before succumbing to a last minute defeat to King's Lynn. In October, arsonists burned down Salford's clubhouse, destroying memorabilia and photographs collected for over 20 years. In February 2010, having lost four of their last five home matches, Salford parted company with Wright. Chairman Darren Quick took the unusual step of taking on the role of caretaker manager, to be assisted by the club's former manager Mark Molyneaux, with the pair taking four points of a possible six after beating Garforth Town 1–0 and drawing with Wakefield. A few weeks later, it was revealed the pair would be in charge until the end of the season. Under the pair, the team again enjoyed a strong finish to the season, taking 36 points from the remaining games and finishing 11th in the table, their highest ever league finish.

Salford started the 2010–11 season in similar form to the end of the previous; a last minute equaliser earned a 2–2 draw with Trafford which was followed with a 2–1 away to Prescot Cables, meaning they sat in eighth place, their highest league position since promotion two years earlier. But their form soon took a downturn; following two heavy home defeats in the league in four days, 4–0 to Chester and 5–0 to Skelmersdale United, and a 4–1 defeat in the FA Trophy qualification to Ossett Albion, Quick decided to end his tenure as caretaker manager having lost six games in a row. He quickly replaced himself with Rhodri Giggs, who would act as player-manager, and he began his reign with a 4–0 win against Durham City. Results continued to improve under Giggs, managing to win his first six games in charge which resulted in Salford being just outside the promotion places. However, after losing star striker Steve Foster to Chorley in March, Salford lost 6–2 to Durham. It was Foster's replacement Jack Redshaw who would help Salford rediscover their form, scoring the second in a 2–1 win against Wakefield for the club's first win in seven games, before taking his tally to five goals in four games by scoring both goals in a 2–0 win over struggling Leigh Genesis. After picking up four points from six against during the Easter weekend against Prescot Cables and Warrington Town, Salford moved into the top ten, and eventually finished the season in 12th position.

The club began well in 2011–12, with hopes of a playoff push, but a poor run of form at the start of 2012, combined with the frequent departure of the club's top players, including Player of the Year Matty Cross to Warrington, resulted in a mid-table finish. After the final home game of the season, Giggs announced he was resigning from the post with immediate effect, with club captain Darren Hockenhull taking over the final two games against AFC Fylde and Ossett Albion.

In May 2012, the club appointed Darren Sheridan as the new manager. The 2012–13 league season started well, and the club also enjoyed a local derby in the preliminary round of the FA Cup against FC United of Manchester. Over 1,300 fans were in attendance at Moor Lane to watch a narrow loss in a five-goal thriller. Sheridan's tenure lasted only eight months, resigning in January 2013 following a review of the club's budget, with his final game being a 5–2 win against Wakefield despite being down to 8 players. Salford appointed Andy Heald as caretaker manager, before announcing his permanent appointment a month later. Before his first game, club captain Jimmy Holden departed, defender Jameel Ibe left for York City, and striker Danny Heffernan returned to Australia; Heald managed the team to a 2–2 draw with Mossley. Under his leadership, Salford finished a disappointing 16th place, which included a 6–0 battering by Trafford, but enjoyed a run to the final of the Manchester Premier Cup where they faced Mossley at Edgeley Park; despite a rousing late comeback to level the game at 2–2, Salford lost 4–2 in the resulting penalty shoot-out. At the end of the season, Heald and his assistant Chris Thompson left the club by mutual consent, citing business and family commitments.

Ahead of the 2013–14 campaign, the club experienced several major changes; club legend Barry Massay and Phil Power were appointed as joint managers, Salford based businesswoman Karen Baird took over as chairman from the long-serving Quick, and the first team squad now had a "Salford core", having retained only three players from the previous season. The new management team got off to a strong start, beginning with a first ever opening day victory in the division, a 1–0 victory over Harrogate Railway Athletic, and were unbeaten after the first six games of the season until a 2–0 defeat to Burscough. Form began to dip, winning just one of their next twelve games before a 2–1 away win against Ossett Albion in November. The decision was made to reshuffle the management team with Power assuming sole managerial responsibility and Massay dropping down to an assistant managerial role, before subsequently leaving the club completely a month later. In their next game, Salford scored their most ever goals in a game in the division when they defeated Kendal Town 6–3 at home.

=== Takeover by the Class of '92 (2014–2017) ===
On 27 March 2014, it was announced that, subject to FA and NPL approval, Salford would be taken over by the Project 92 Limited consortium, a group consisting of former Manchester United players Nicky Butt, Ryan Giggs, Gary Neville, Phil Neville, and Paul Scholes, known collectively as the Class of '92, expected to be completed by the summer. Chairman Karen Baird described it as "massive", saying it would secure the future of the club. At the following Salford games, a 3–2 win over Farsley Celtic and a 3–1 home loss to New Mills, fans chanted "We are Tangerine" in protest at rumours the club's colours would be changed. Fan unrest continued to grow until the final game of the season, a 3–1 loss to Prescot Cables, which meant Salford finished the season in 12th position.

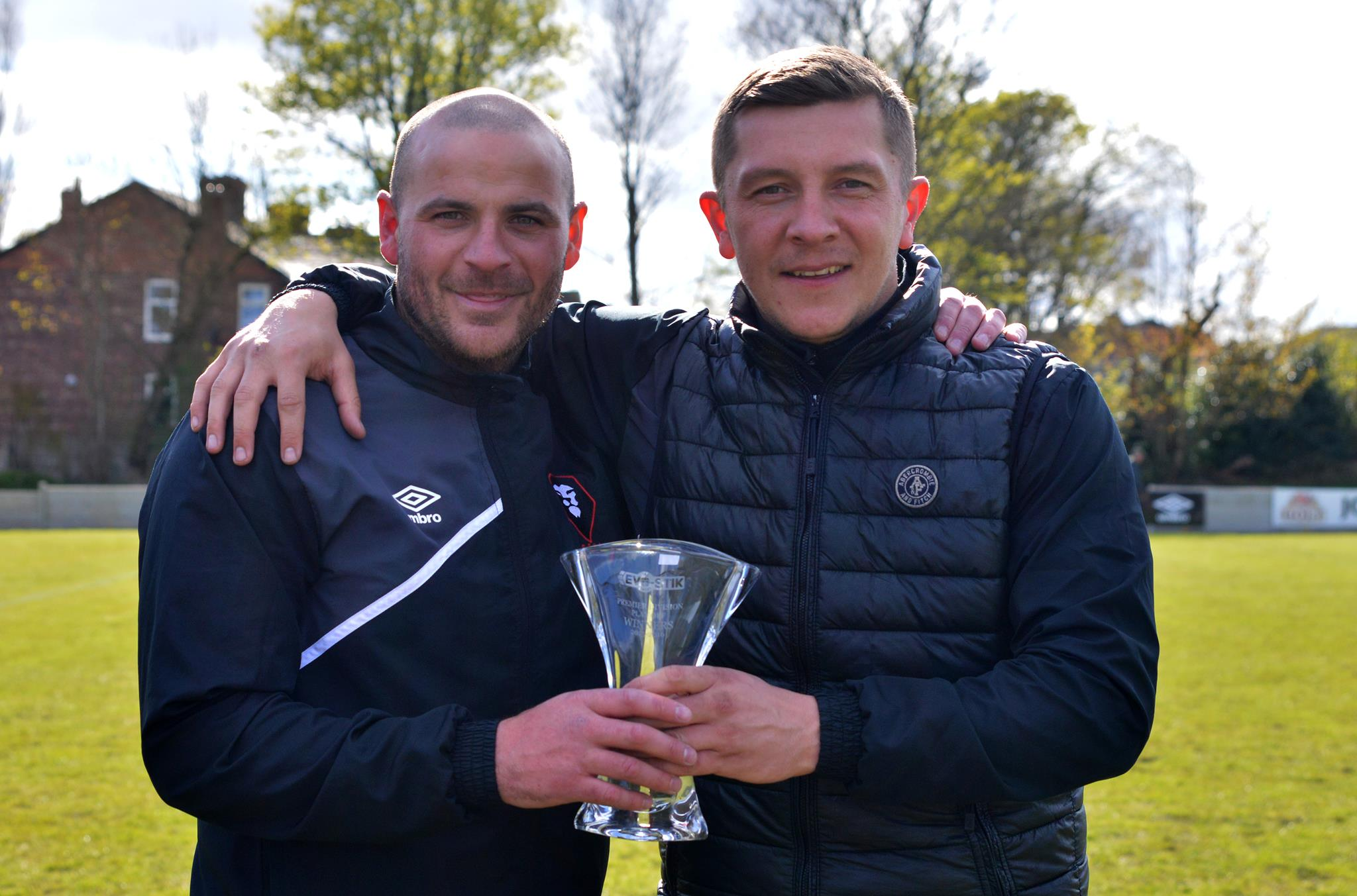
Bernard Morley (left) and Anthony Johnson were appointed joint-managers in January 2015.

With the proposed takeover of the club completed, the new ownership team were present at pre-season training in July 2014, at which Giggs suggested the consortium had ambitious aims for the non-league club, with a target of Championship level football within 15 years. It was confirmed that Baird would remain the club's chairman and Power would continue as manager. Prior to the start of the 2014–15 season, the club announced a showcase match against a "Class of '92 XI" featuring all five of the new owners which Salford City went on to win 5–1. The 2014–15 season began with a 4–1 win at Moor Lane against Scarborough Athletic, with several hardcore fans refusing to attend in protest to the changing of the club colours and badge, while the Salford Star dubbed the group The Class of Vincent Tan in reference to the Cardiff City owner who had also changed the club colours to red. The good start continued, with Salford unbeaten in the first 13 games. In September, the ownership team announced that they had agreed to sell a 50% stake in the club to Singapore–based billionaire Peter Lim, the owner of Valencia.

Despite the promising start, a dip in form during December resulted in only four wins from the following 11 matches, which saw the team fall behind Darlington at the top of the league. As a result, Power was sacked in January 2015 after 18 months in the role. Scholes and Phil Neville acted as caretaker managers for the subsequent match against Kendal Town, before announcing the arrival of the new managerial team of Anthony Johnson and Bernard Morley. Johnson and Morley had led Ramsbottom United to promotion from the NPL Division One North during the previous season. The new managerial team went on to win 15 of the remaining 17 matches of the season, a feat which saw them regain their place at the top of the table. With Darlington failing to win their penultimate match of the season, Salford were crowned champions, guaranteeing promotion to the NPL Premier Division. The championship was celebrated with Salford recording their ninth consecutive win in a 5–0 victory over Ossett Town in front of a crowd of over 1,100.

FA Cup starting line-up vs Notts County, the club's first ever first round cup match

Johnson and Morley's first full season at the club began with a 0–0 home draw with Marine. The club reached the 1st round of the FA Cup for the first time in their 25-year association with the competition, having defeated fellow league side Whitby Town, Curzon Ashton and Bradford (Park Avenue) from the National League North, and Southport from the National League in the qualifying rounds. In front of a sell-out crowd of 1,400 and airing live on the BBC, Salford scored a famous 2–0 win over League Two side Notts County at Moor Lane, with goals from Danny Webber and substitute Richie Allen. In the 2nd round, they were drawn at home to another League Two side, Hartlepool United, A 1–1 draw, again televised on the BBC, earned Salford a replay, this time aired on BT Sport, where they took Hartlepool to extra-time before succumbing 2–0.

In January, Salford beat Barwell 7–0 to move second in the table. Having been in the top five places for the majority of the season, Salford eventually finished third behind champions Darlington 1883 and runners-up Blyth Spartans to claim a playoff place. Ashton United were defeated 3–1 in the semi-final at Moor Lane, which was followed up four days later with a 3–2 win over Workington at the same venue in front of nearly 2,000 spectators. The Ammies' scored twice in the final eleven minutes to claim their place in the National League North for the 2016–17 season, the highest level the club had ever reached in their 76-year history.

Johnson and Morley celebrated their 100th game in charge on 19 November, with Salford picking up a 3–0 win against Worcester City.

=== Turning professional (2017–2019) ===

2019 National League play-off final starting line-up.

In March 2017, Johnson and Morley both signed two-year full-time contracts, starting from 1 April. The club also announced that from 1 July, players with the club would become full-time professional players. Salford appointed Chris Casper, who was part of the Class of '92, as the club's sporting director in charge of Academy 92. Ahead of their first professional campaign, the owners outlined their target to eventually reach the Premier League. In May, Salford lost in the National League North play-off semi-final, being defeated on penalties by FC Halifax Town.

On 12 August, Mani Ogunrinde and Anointed Chukwu became the first Academy 92 players to represent the first team, when they came on as late substitutes in a 2–0 away win against Telford United. On 21 April 2018, with promotion rivals Harrogate Town losing away to Bradford P.A., the club were promoted as champions of the National League North with one game to play, and in the process secured promotion to National League, once again re-setting the bar for the highest level the club had ever attained. On 8 May, it was announced Johnson and Morley had left the club by mutual consent, due to irreconcilable differences regarding performance and contract length. On 14 May, Graham Alexander was appointed as the club's new manager after signing a four-year contract.

Ahead of the season, Salford were regarded as favourites to take the one automatic promotion place, but faced criticism for their spending and were accused of trying to "steal" a place in the Football League. In their first game in the National League on 4 August, they drew 1–1 with promotion rivals Leyton Orient, with their goal being scored by Rory Gaffney. Their first victory in the division was achieved on 14 August, with a 2–1 home win against Halifax Town. Salford reached the first round of the FA Cup for the second time and earned a replay after an away draw at League One Shrewsbury Town, before succumbing to a 3–1 home defeat in the replay. Salford suffered three consecutive defeats in the Christmas period which left them in third place, five points behind the summit.

They quickly closed the gap on leaders Leyton Orient, winning 3–0 in the reverse fixture at Brisbane Road on 5 January. Later that month it was announced that David Beckham was set to join his Class of '92 teammates as part owner of the club, taking 10% of the club previously held by Peter Lim. Salford would go on a 10 match unbeaten run, but would finally miss out on the title, and automatic promotion, by losing their final games of the season, meaning the club finished third in the table behind champions Orient and Solihull Moors.

During the season, Salford played their first ever games in the FA Trophy proper, a 3–1 win over Gateshead in the first round. Salford reached the National League play-off final after overcoming Eastleigh in a penalty shootout after a 1–1 draw, meaning they would play at Wembley Stadium for the first time in their history. On 11 May 2019, they beat AFC Fylde 3–0 in the final, with goals from Emmanuel Dieseruvwe, Carl Piergianni, and Ibou Touray; this marked the first time Salford had ever reached the Football League. During the summer, the club appointed Warren Joyce to manage their first ever development squad, designed to be a stepping stone between the academy and the first team.

=== Football league (2019–present) ===
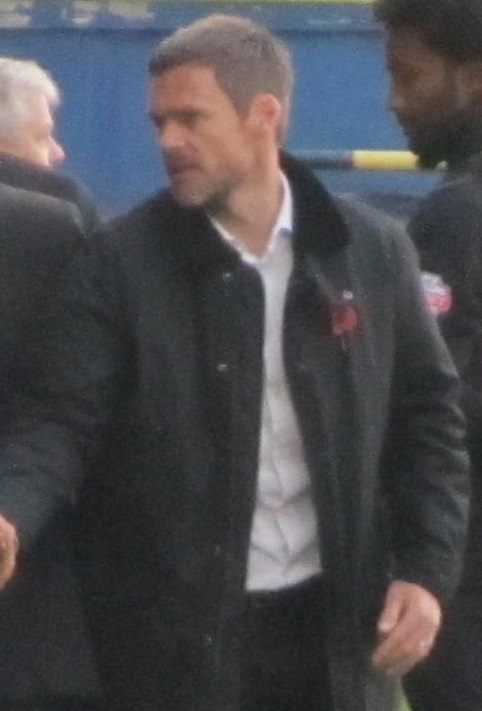
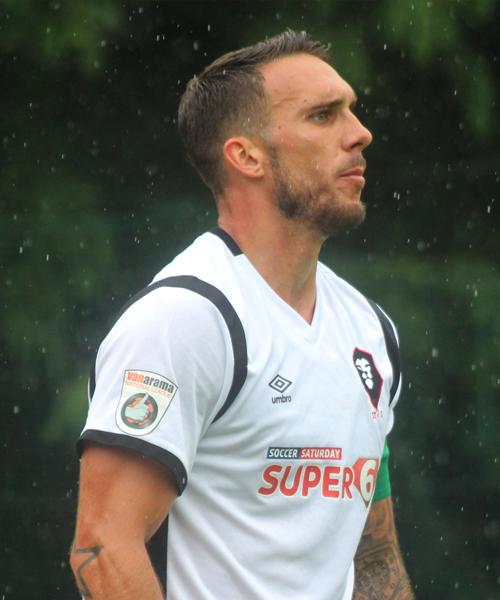
Manager Graham Alexander (left) and captain Liam Hogan (right) helped Salford City reach the Football League for the first time.

2020 EFL Trophy final starting line-up.

They began their first season in the league with a 2–0 win against Stevenage, with both goals coming from Dieseruvwe. Salford would take part in two competitions for the first time; they lost their first ever game in the League Cup 3–0 at home to Leeds United in front of 4,518 fans, a record attendance at Moor Lane. Later in the season, the club would reach the EFL Trophy final after defeating Newport County via a penalty shootout, where they were due to play League One side Portsmouth; the game was postponed indefinitely following the COVID-19 pandemic in the United Kingdom. In June, the league season was officially cut short after League Two clubs voted by an "overwhelmingly majority", with the league table to be decided on a points per game basis, meaning Salford finished their début season in the Football League in 11th. Later that month, Salford took the decision to scrap their under-18 team, deciding to focus exclusively on the development squad. Phil Neville said that the reason was both financial and because lower-league clubs could not attract the best youth players, and that the club would have a better chance developing 18 to 20 year olds under Warren Joyce.

In September 2020, it was announced that following a meeting held by the EFL with representatives from both Salford and Portsmouth, that the EFL Trophy final would now take place in 2021. Alexander departed the club on 12 October with the club 5th in the league; co-owner Scholes took the job on an interim basis. Alexander declared himself "disappointed" but said he hoped he gave everybody at the club "some great times to remember". Scholes quickly ruled out taking the position on a permanent basis, citing the need for a more experienced manager.

On 4 November, the club announced that former Salford player Richie Wellens, would be their new manager. Wellens guided Salford to victory in the rescheduled EFL Trophy final; a 0–0 draw was followed by a penalty shootout, with Salford winning 4–2 after successful penalties by Burgess, Dieseruvwe, Brandon Thomas-Asante, and Jason Lowe. However, Wellens' time at the club came to an end on 22 March, departing Salford by mutual consent following a run of one win in eight games. Gary Bowyer was his replacement in charge, signing a deal until the end of the season. However, he managed the club's worst start to a campaign since the 2014 takeover, with no wins in the opening four games.

In October 2022, Gary Neville stepped down as the club's chief executive, being replaced by fellow co-owner Nicky Butt.

In January 2025, they were performing well in EFL League Two, occupying third place in the league table. They were also successful in the early rounds of the FA Cup, winning both the first and second matches, booking a third-round encounter with Premier League title holders Manchester City at the Etihad stadium. With over 5,000 Salford fans making the five mile trip, the match resulted in an 8–0 defeat, the worst in the club's history. Despite the heavy defeat, Salford City made history by reaching the third round of the tournament for the first time.

== Stadium ==
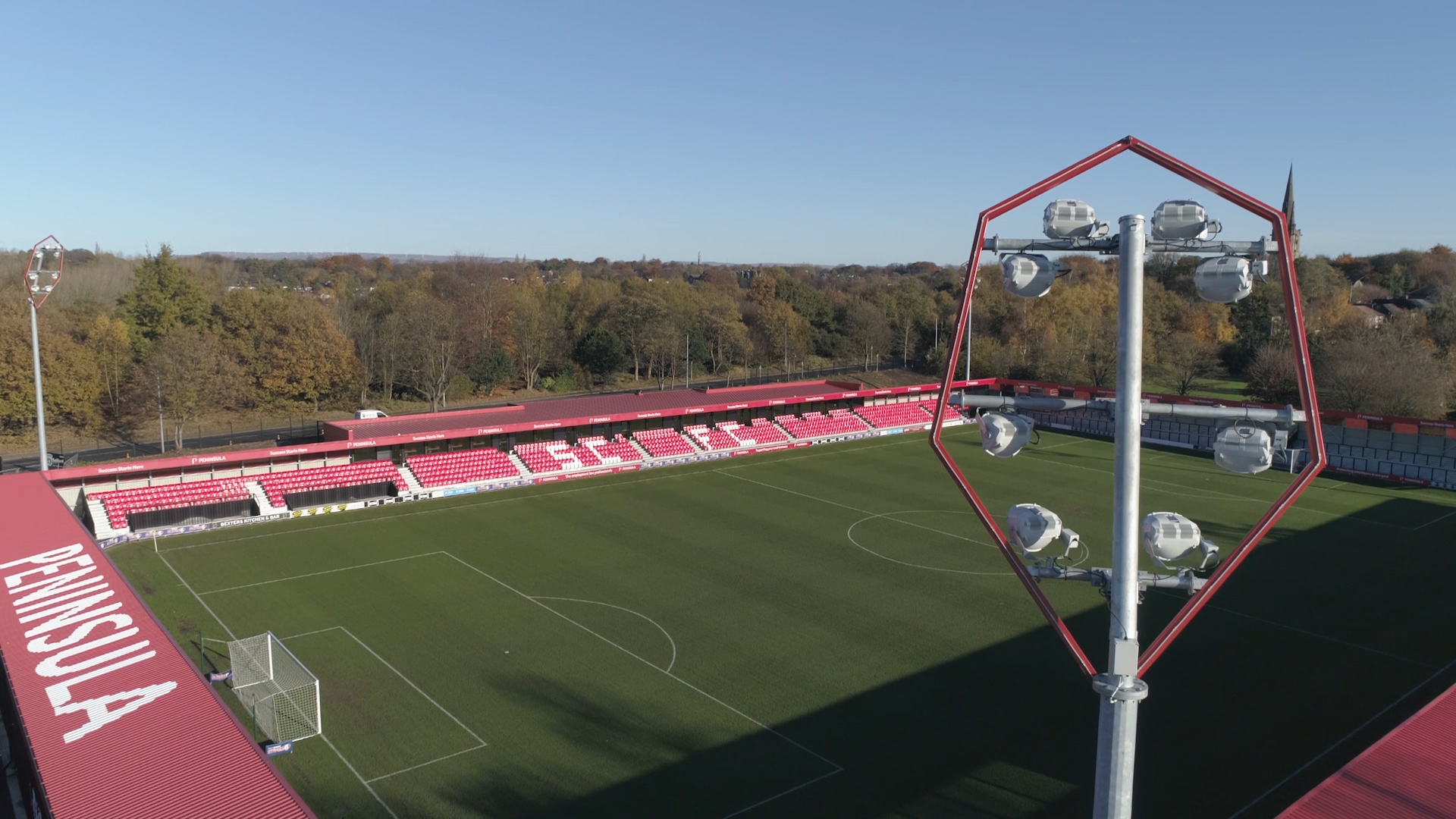
Moor Lane, home of Salford City.

Salford play their home games at Moor Lane, known as the Peninsula Stadium for sponsorship reasons, located in the Kersal area of Salford. The stadium has a capacity of 5,108. The club has played their games at Moor Lane since 1978.

In December 2015, Salford City Council approved planning permission for the capacity of the ground to be increased from 2,163 to 5,172. In October of the following year, Salford unveiled plans to renovate the ground to comply with standards of the Football League, which would increase the capacity to 5,100. The plans included terraced stands behind the goals, a supporters' club with a capacity of 600, and executive seating.

In December, it was revealed Salford faced objections from hundreds of local residents, and the newly formed Kersal Moor Residents' Association, regarding the club's proposals, with worries over traffic and parking. However, later that month, Salford City Council granted permission for the ground's development. This involved completely demolishing the Moor Lane ground, the club's home since 1978, and putting in four new stands. By the end of February, two stands had already been completed as the club tried to beat a March deadline with regards to ground grading. In May, the "iconic" main stand was demolished as building work progressed.

On 19 October 2017, the newly built ground was renamed Peninsula Stadium for sponsorship reasons, and was unveiled by the Class of '92's former Manchester United manager Alex Ferguson; the renaming was part a five-year deal with a local entrepreneur Peter Done, who founded the law employment experts Peninsula in Salford. The ground has floodlights in the shape of the club badge, while the terraces are "tight, steep, and covered", and has a leafy backdrop with a nearby church spire visible from within the ground.

== Colours and club badge ==
The club's colours are orange and black, which were originally used in 1980. After the change in ownership in 2014, the club changed to playing in red and white, the colours of Manchester United. Many Salford supporters were unhappy with the change at the time, with manager Phil Power describing the issue as "delicate". The team also previously wore green in the 1970s, and had used various blue kits throughout the years; orange became their colour when dealing with financial difficulties and borrowed old kits from Blackpool. In October 2025, the club announced that they would be reverting to wearing orange before the start of the next season.

City of Salford Coat of Arms

The club's logo also changed during 2014 to 2026, replacing a rampant lion with one described as "bolder, more forward-facing", and the shape of the logo was said to replicate the hull of the ships in Salford's docks. Prior to the 2026–27 season, it was reverted back to a round badge with the traditional lion, inspired by the one used before the takeover, and features a rose, which is a homage to the Salford Lads Club made famous by the cover of The Smiths' 1986 album "The Queen is Dead".

The club adopted two mottos from the coat of arms of the City of Salford; the original motto "Integrity & Industry" features on the club kit, while the current city motto "The Welfare of the People is the Highest Law", translated from the Latin "Salus Populi Suprema Lex", is featured on the stadium walls.

=== Kit suppliers and shirt sponsors ===
In 2013, Salford announced that the club's new main sponsors would be Manchester-based insurance brokers Champion Insurance. They were replaced in 2015 by LED Hut, and in 2017, the club signed a long-term deal with Soccer Saturday Super 6 to become the shirt sponsor. Upon the expiration of the deal, telecommunications company TalkTalk became Salford's lead sponsor until the end of the 2023–24 season.

In 2015, the club announced their kits would be supplied by Umbro after signing a five-year contract. However, in 2019, Italian sportswear brand Kappa were confirmed to be the new manufacturer of Salford's kits on a three-year deal. After the conclusion of this arrangement, Castore became the manufacturer of Salford's kits from the 2022–23 season.

Tables of kit suppliers and shirt sponsors appear below:

Period	Supplier	Sponsor
2006–07	ProStar	ArcelorMittal
2007–08	ProStar	Avis Steel
2008–09	ProStar	ArcelorMittal
2009–10	ProStar	1010 Taxis
2010–11	Lotto	1010 Taxis
2011–13	Stanno	1010 Taxis
2013–14	SK Kits	Champion Insurance
2014–15	Carbrini	Champion Insurance
2015–17	Umbro	LED Hut
2017–19	Umbro	Soccer Saturday Super6
2019–20	Kappa	Soccer Saturday Super6
2020–22	Kappa	TalkTalk
2022–23	Castore	TalkTalk
2023–24	Adidas	Salboy
2024–2026	Adidas	Fireball
2026–	Adidas	AIG

== Supporters and rivalries ==
At each home game the team walks out to The Pogues' cover of Dirty Old Town, the 1949 Ewan McColl song inspired by the singer's childhood in Salford. Following the takeover by the Class of '92, Salford's fanbase and resulting attendance figures has steadily grown; ahead of their début season as a Football League club, Salford had sold over 1,900 season tickets, an increase of approximately 800 from the previous season. The rise in fanbase has in part been attributed to many Manchester United supporters opting to attend games at Salford due to the cost of attending games at Old Trafford and the relative affordability of a season ticket at Moor Lane.

Since their promotion to the Football League, the club do not maintain any strong rivalries. However, a survey conducted in August 2019 suggested that supporters of the club consider near neighbours Oldham Athletic, Stockport County, Bolton Wanderers and Rochdale to be the club's main rivals. However, none of these clubs yet reciprocate the rivalry. The 2019 survey also revealed that smaller rivalries with Accrington Stanley, Macclesfield Town and Crewe Alexandra also exist.

Fans of the club also maintain a dislike for East London-based Leyton Orient due to the race for the 2018–19 National League title, which Orient eventually won. During the club's non-league days, they maintained rivalries with Curzon Ashton, Darlington, FC United of Manchester, Ashton United and Radcliffe Borough.

The club has three mascots, a pride of anthropomorphic lions named Bobby, Billy, and Babs; the latter two were named as part of a competition in local schools.

== Ownership ==
For many years, local businessman and former player Harold Brearley was in charge of Salford, helping take the club from local leagues into the semi-professional North West Counties League in 1982, and was instrumental in moving the club to their current home of Moor Lane in 1979. In June 2006, local businessman and former Salford player Darren Quick became the new Salford chairman, taking over from Ged Carter. In December 2013, Salford club president Dave Russell held secret talks with former Manchester United players Gary Neville and Ryan Giggs.

In February 2014, it was revealed by a local newspaper, the Salford Star, that as well as Gary Neville and Giggs, fellow former Manchester United players Nicky Butt, Phil Neville, and Paul Scholes, known collectively as the Class of '92, were in talks with the club regarding "major investment". Gary Neville and Giggs were said to be concerned with the lack of talent produced at grassroots level, and chose Salford due to the club's proximity to The Cliff, the former training ground used by Manchester United when the pair were youngsters. With talks ongoing, four of the prospective buyers (Butt, Giggs, Gary Neville, and Scholes) attended the 2–0 home defeat to Curzon Ashton on 1 March. On 27 March, it was announced that, subject to Football Association and NPL approval, the group had agreed a deal to take over the club, expected to be completed by the summer. In September, Singaporean businessman Peter Lim bought a 50% stake in the club, subject to FA approval. Lim said his involvement would be philanthropic, part of a long-term business partnership with Gary Neville.

Ahead of the club's first season in the National League in 2018, the club received interest free loans totalling approximately £2.4m, allowing the club to invest in players such as Adam Rooney from Scottish team Aberdeen for a fee reported as £300k. In 2020, it was revealed that the owners had invested a further £2.5m to aid the club's push for promotion, as well as to develop the club off the pitch. Later that year, the club chose not to place staff on furlough amidst the COVID-19 pandemic in the United Kingdom despite potential savings of £350k.

In August 2024 it was announced that Gary Neville had acquired Lim's stake in Salford.

The Club announced in May 2025 that it had been acquired by a new ownership group, led by David Beckham and Gary Neville, together with US-based businessman Declan Kelly and Mervyn, Lord Davies. The acquisition has been uniquely structured, through a members club made up of nine shareholders including Dream Sports Group (India’s leading sports technology company), Colin Ryan (Founder, Clipper Street Capital), Frank Ryan (Global Co-Chair, Global Co-CEO, and Americas Chair, DLA Piper), Nick Woodhouse (Executive Vice Chairman, Authentic Brands Group), and Shravin Mittal (Founder of Unbound). Fellow Class of '92 members Nicky Butt, Ryan Giggs, Phil Neville and Paul Scholes will no longer be shareholders, but they will continue to have roles in the Club across technical, football, commercial, recruitment and the SCFC foundation.

== In the media ==
Ahead of the club's first ever FA Cup tie against Notts County in 2015, Salford were featured in a BBC One two-part documentary series titled Class of 92: Out of Their League, which showcased the first season under the ownership of the group following their takeover the previous year. The Independent described it as "enthralling", while The Daily Telegraph described it as an "honest, appealing portrait" of non-league football. The BBC later commissioned a second series in February 2016, describing the first as a "resounding success". A third series aired in 2017 on Sky Sports.

== Players ==
=== First-team squad ===
As of 6 September 2026

Note: Flags indicate national team as defined under FIFA eligibility rules; some limited exceptions apply. Players may hold more than one non-FIFA nationality.

No.	Pos.	Nation	Player
1	GK	ENG	Will Norris
2	DF	UGA	Nathan Asiimwe (on loan from Charlton Athletic)
3	DF	ENG	Zach Awe
4	DF	ENG	Will Aimson
5	DF	SCO	Michael Rose
6	MF	ENG	Joe Powell
7	MF	WAL	Ben Woodburn
8	MF	ENG	Jorge Grant
9	FW	ENG	Macaulay Langstaff
10	MF	NED	Kelly N'Mai
11	FW	ENG	Jay Bird
12	GK	ENG	Sam Long
13	GK	ENG	Tom Myles
14	FW	ENG	Abraham Odoh
15	DF	WAL	Brandon Cooper
16	MF	GUY	Elliot Bonds
17	DF	ENG	Dan Scarr

No.	Pos.	Nation	Player
18	MF	ENG	Matt Butcher
19	FW	IRL	Ryan Graydon
20	DF	ENG	Ollie Turton
21	MF	SLE	Kallum Cesay
22	DF	NGR	Adebola Oluwo
23	FW	NGR	Daniel Udoh
24	DF	ENG	Taylor Allen (on loan from Wycombe Wanderers)
29	DF	ENG	Luke Garbutt (captain)
31	MF	ESP	Bruno Padovani
33	DF	ENG	Hayden Carson
34	MF	ENG	Ruben Butt
37	MF	ENG	Marshall Heys
39	MF	ENG	Alfie Bairstow
43	FW	ENG	Luke Molyneux
44	MF	ENG	Brendan Wiredu

=== Development squad ===
As of 21 October 2026

Note: Flags indicate national team as defined under FIFA eligibility rules; some limited exceptions apply. Players may hold more than one non-FIFA nationality.

No.	Pos.	Nation	Player
—	MF	AUS	Jai Curran-Nicholls
—	MF	ENG	Bruno Padovani
—	DF	ENG	Jacob Lara
—	MF	ENG	Marshall Heys

No.	Pos.	Nation	Player
—	MF	ENG	Alfie Bairstow
—	DF	ENG	Luca Jackson
—	FW	ENG	Harry Showman
—	DF	ENG	Harry O'Gara

=== Out on loan ===
Note: Flags indicate national team as defined under FIFA eligibility rules; some limited exceptions apply. Players may hold more than one non-FIFA nationality.

No.	Pos.	Nation	Player
—	DF	CGO	Loick Ayina (on loan at Yeovil Town until 30 June 2027)
—	MF	ENG	Ruben Butt (on loan at Chester until January 2027)
—	FW	ENG	Kyrell Malcolm (on loan at AFC Fylde until January 2027)

=== Player of the Season Awards ===
Season	Players' Player	Supporters' Player	Ref
2008–09	(England) Steve Foster		
2009–10	(England) Martyn Andrews	(England) Martyn Andrews (Wales) Rhodri Giggs	
2010–11	(England) Darren Hockenhull	(England) Matty Cross	
2011–12	(England) Darren Hockenhull		
2012–13	(England) Jamie Rother	(England) Ritchie Branagan	
2013–14	(England) Aaron Walters		
2014–15	(England) Chris Lynch	(England) Gareth Seddon	
2015–16	(England) Chris Lynch		
2016–17	(England) Scott Burton	(Saint Kitts and Nevis) Michael Nottingham	
2017–18	(England) Liam Hogan	(England) Carl Piergianni	
2018–19	(England) Carl Piergianni		
2019–20	(The Gambia) Ibou Touray		
2020–21	(Czech Republic) Václav Hladký		
2021–22	(England) Jason Lowe	(Republic of Ireland) Corrie Ndaba	
2022–23	(England) Elliot Watt	(England) Callum Hendry	

== Non-playing staff ==
=== Club officials ===
Position	Name
Owner(s)	(England) David Beckham
Owner(s)	(England) Gary Neville
Chief Executive Officer	(England) Gavin Fleig
Chief Business Owner	(England) Ronan Joyce

=== Coaching staff ===
Position	Staff
Head Coach	(Australia) Peter Cklamovski
Assistant Coach	Matt Smith
Goalkeeping Coach	Aaron Cameron
B-Team Coach	(England) Danny Byrne
Head of Academy	Jamie Russell

=== Managerial history ===
Name	Period	Achievements
(England) Gary Fellows	2005–08	2007–08 NWCFL Division One (promotion)
(England) Ashley Berry	2008	
(England) Neil Hall	2009	
(England) Paul Wright	2009–10	
(Wales) Rhodri Giggs	2010–12	
(England) Darren Sheridan	2012–13	
(England) Andy Heald	2013–14	
(England) Phil Power	2014–15	
(England) Anthony Johnson (England) Bernard Morley	2015–18	2014–15 NPL Division One North; 2015–16 NPL Premier Division; 2017–18 National League North
(Scotland) Graham Alexander	2018–20	2019 National League play-offs
(England) Richie Wellens	2020–21	2019–20 EFL Trophy
(England) Gary Bowyer	2021–22	
(England) Neil Wood	2022–2023	
(England) Karl Robinson	2023–2026	
(Australia) Peter Cklamovski	2026–	

== Club records ==
Anson Villa FC

- Best league performance: 15th in Mid-Cheshire Association Football League Division Two, 1978–79
- Best FA Vase performance: Fifth round, 1976–77

Salford Amateurs FC

- Best FA Vase performance: Second round, 1978–79

Salford FC

- Best league performance: 15th in North West Counties Football League Division One, 1984–85 and 1987–88
- Best FA Vase performance: Fourth round, 1980–81

Salford City FC

- Best league performance: 4th in EFL League Two (level 4), 2025–26
- Best FA Cup performance: Fourth round, 2025–26
- Best EFL Cup performance: Third round, 2023–24
- Best EFL Trophy performance: Winners, 2019–20
- Best FA Trophy performance: Third round, 2018–19 (replay)
- Best FA Vase performance: Fourth round, 2007–08
- Record cup attendance: 4,518 vs. Leeds United, League Cup first round, 13 August 2019
- Record league attendance: 4,058 vs. FC United of Manchester, North West Counties Football League, 3 October 2006

== Honours ==
League

- National League (level 5)
  - Play-off winners: 2019
- National League North (level 6)
  - Champions: 2017–18
- Northern Premier League (level 7)
  - Play-off winners: 2016
- Northern Premier League Division One North (level 8)
  - Champions: 2014–15
- North West Counties League Premier Division (level 9)
  - Runners-up: 2007–08

Cup

- EFL Trophy
  - Winners: 2019–20
- Manchester Premier Cup
  - Winners: 1977–78, 1978–79
- North West Counties League League Challenge Cup
  - Winners: 2005–06
- Lancashire Amateur Cup
  - Winners: 1971, 1973, 1975

== Salford City Lionesses ==
Salford City Lionesses
- Founded: 2018; 8 years ago
- Owner: Project 92 Limited
- Manager: Caz Simone
- League: North West Women's Regional Football League Division One Central
- 2025–26: 2nd
- Website: salfordcityfc.co.uk
Home colours	Away colours

In 2018, the club set up a women's team, named the Salford City Lionesses, with the team to play in the Greater Manchester Women's Football League. In the first game of the season, they recorded a 13–0 win against Urmston Meadowside, with Feiruz Abdullahi scoring six. In the team's first season, they won the league championship with a goal difference of +116 and reached three cup finals, winning two and losing one which was the only defeat of the season. The Lionesses competed in the Women's FA Cup for the first time during the 2020–21 season, losing in the preliminary round to Morecambe. The following season, Salford reached the FA Cup proper, advancing to the second round before losing to Newcastle United.
