= 1874 in association football =

The following are events in 1874 which are relevant to the development of association football. Included are events in closely related codes, such as the Sheffield Rules.

== Events ==
- 7 March – Scotland defeat 2–1 England at Hamilton Crescent in Glasgow before a crowd of 7,000.
- 14 March – Oxford University defeat Royal Engineers 2–0 in the third FA Cup Final. Played at the Kennington Oval in south London, the attendance is 2,000.
- 21 March – The inaugural Scottish Cup Final is played at Hampden Park. Queen's Park defeat Clydesdale 2–0 before a crowd of 3,000.

== Clubs founded ==
=== England ===
- Aston Villa
- Bolton Wanderers
- Macclesfield Town
- Northwich Victoria

=== Scotland ===
- Greenock Morton
- Hamilton Academical
- Heart of Midlothian (Hearts)

== Domestic cups ==
Nation	Tournament	Winner	Score	Runner-up	Venue	Title
England	1873–74 FA Cup	Oxford University	2–0	Royal Engineers	Kennington Oval	1st
Scotland	1873–74 Scottish Cup	Queen's Park	2–0	Clydesdale	Hampden Park	1st

== Births ==
- 20 April – Steve Bloomer (d. 1938), England international forward in 23 matches (1895–1907), scoring 28 goals.
- 25 April – Tom Booth (d. 1939), England international; over 100 appearances for Blackburn Rovers and Everton.
- 1 July – Dan Nurse (d. 1959), English footballer
- 28 August – Arthur Saxton, English professional footballer (d. 1911)
- 2 November – Thomas Baddeley (d. 1946), England international goalkeeper in five matches (1903–1904); over 300 appearances for Wolverhampton Wanderers.
- 2 November – Herbert Banks (d. 1947), England international forward.
- 31 December – Walter Bennett (d. 1908), England international and two-time FA Cup winner with Sheffield United.

== Deaths ==
- 14 March – Alfred Goodwyn (b. 1850), England defender in the 1873 match against Scotland. Member of the Royal Engineers team in the 1872 FA Cup Final. The first international footballer to die (as a result of a riding injury in India).
