= Billy Haydock =

English football player and manager (1936-2020)

Personal information
- Full name: William Edward Haydock
- Date of birth: 19 January 1936
- Place of birth: Salford, England
- Date of death: February 2020 (aged 84)
- Place of death: Blackpool, England
- Position: Winger

Youth career
- Buxton

Senior career*
Years	Team	Apps	(Gls)
19??–1959	Buxton		
1959–1961	Manchester City	3	(1)
1961–1964	Crewe Alexandra	142	(30)
1964–1965	Grimsby Town	21	(4)
1965–1971	Stockport County	261	(3)
1971	Port Elizabeth City		
1971–1972	Southport	7	(0)
Total		434	(38)

Managerial career
- 1972–1974: Macclesfield Town (player/manager)
- 1987–1988: Cork City (assistant)
- * Club domestic league appearances and goals

William Edward Haydock (19 January 1936 – February 2020) was an English footballer who played as a winger in the Football League for Manchester City, Crewe Alexandra, Grimsby Town, Stockport County and Southport. He managed Macclesfield Town from the start of the 1972 – 73 season until January 1974. Haydock died in Blackpool in February 2020, aged 84.
