= John Collins (footballer, born 1945) =

English footballer and manager

Personal information
- Full name: John Joseph Collins
- Date of birth: 30 January 1945 (age 81)
- Place of birth: Manchester, England
- Position: Defender

Youth career
- 1963–1964: Blackburn Rovers

Senior career*
Years	Team	Apps	(Gls)
1964–1966	Stockport County	84	(1)
1966–1976	Macclesfield Town	383	(8)
Total		467	(9)

Managerial career
- 1974: Macclesfield Town (caretaker)
- 1974–1976: Macclesfield Town
- * Club domestic league appearances and goals

John Joseph Collins (born 30 January 1945) is an English former footballer and manager.

Collins signed for Blackburn Rovers in 1963, but mainly turned out for the club's junior team. In 1964, he signed for Stockport County, where he struck up a good partnership with fellow defender Frank Beaumont, making eighty-four league appearances over two seasons. In 1966, he signed for Macclesfield Town, and it was here where he made his name. Initially used as a right-back, Collins would later switch position to centre-back. Collins enjoyed a successful period at Macclesfield, as the club won the Northern Premier League in 1969 and 1970, the North West Floodlit League in 1970, the FA Trophy in 1970, and the Cheshire Senior Cup in 1969, 1971 and 1973. Individually, he was voted as the club's Player of the Year in 1971.

Collins' first foray into management came as caretaker of Macclesfield, taking charge of the club during September 1974, following Eddie Brown's departure. In January 1975, Collins again took charge on a caretaker basis, and was later appointed manager, becoming the club's fourth permanent appointment in twelve months. He steered the club to seventeenth place in the league, and in the following season they would progress through the FA Cup qualifying rounds to earn a first round tie against Sheffield Wednesday (then in the Third Division), where they lost 3–1 at Hillsborough. In 1976, Collins resigned as manager, having been at the club for the last ten seasons. He comfortably holds the record number of appearances in the Northern Premier League.
