= Arthur Saxton =

English footballer

Personal information
- Full name: Arthur William Saxton
- Date of birth: 28 August 1874
- Place of birth: Breaston, England
- Date of death: 1911 (aged 36–37)
- Position: Winger

Senior career*
Years	Team	Apps	(Gls)
1891	Long Eaton Athletic		
1891–1892	Long Eaton Rangers		
1892–1893	Mansfield Town		
1893–1894	Mansfield Greenhalgh's		
1894–1895	Loughborough		
1895–1896	Glossop North End		
1896–1898	Stalybridge Rovers		
1898–1899	Sunderland	19	(2)
1899–1900	Bedminster		
1900–1901	Luton Town		
1901	Northampton Town		
1901–1902	Nottingham Forest	1	(0)
1902–1903	Long Eaton St Helen's		
1903–190?	Perks Athletic		
- * Club domestic league appearances and goals

Arthur William Saxton (28 August 1874 – 1911) was an English professional footballer who played as a winger for Sunderland.
