= Dan Nurse =

English footballer

Personal information
- Full name: Daniel Garbett Nurse
- Date of birth: 01.07.1874
- Place of birth: Princes End, England
- Date of death: 1959 (aged 84–85)
- Position: Wing half

Senior career*
Years	Team	Apps	(Gls)
1892–1893	Prince's End		
1893–1894	Coseley		
1894–1901	Wolverhampton Wanderers	39	(1)
1901–1904	West Bromwich Albion	85	(4)
Total		124	(5)
- * Club domestic league appearances and goals

Daniel Garbett Nurse (1874–1959) was an English footballer who played in the Football League for West Bromwich Albion and Wolverhampton Wanderers.
