= 1996–97 Football Conference =

Football Conference
- Season: 1996–97
- Champions: Macclesfield Town (2nd Football Conference title)
- Promoted to the Football League: Macclesfield Town
- Conference League Cup winners: Kidderminster Harriers
- FA Trophy winners: Woking (3rd FA Trophy title
- Relegated to Level 6: Altrincham, Bath City, Bromsgrove Rovers
- Matches: 462
- Goals: 1,306 (2.83 per match)
- Top goalscorer: (England) Lee Hughes (Kidderminster Harriers), 30
- Biggest home win: Woking – Altrincham 7–1 (30 November 1996); Kidderminster Harriers – Bath City 6–0 (28 December 1996); Slough Town – Telford United 6–0 (19 October 1996); Stevenage Borough – Halifax Town 6–0 (17 August 1996)
- Biggest away win: Slough Town – Stevenage Borough 1–6 (1 January 1997); Bromsgrove Rovers – Northwich Victoria 0–5 (1 March 1997); Dover Athletic – Kidderminster Harriers 0–5 (24 August 1996); Telford United – Rushden & Diamonds 0–5 (7 December 1996)
- Highest scoring: Halifax Town – Bath City 4–5 (15 February 1997)
- Longest winning run: Macclesfield Town, 8 matches
- Longest unbeaten run: Morecambe, 12 matches
- Longest losing run: Bromsgrove Rovers, 7 matches
- Highest attendance: Stevenage Borough v Kidderminster Harriers, 6,489 (25 January 1997)
- Lowest attendance: ?
- Average attendance: 1,258

The Football Conference season of 1996–97 was the eighteenth season of the Football Conference, also known as the Vauxhall Conference for sponsorship reasons.

== Overview ==
Macclesfield Town won their second Conference title in three years, and this time earned a promotion to the Football League – thanks to their upgraded stadium – at the expense of Hereford United.

== New teams in the league this season ==
- Hayes (promoted 1995–96)
- Rushden & Diamonds (promoted 1995–96)

== Final league table ==
Pos	Team	Pld	W	D	L	GF	GA	GD	Pts	Promotion or relegation
1	Macclesfield Town (C, P)	42	27	9	6	80	30	+50	90	Promotion to the Football League Third Division
2	Kidderminster Harriers	42	26	7	9	84	42	+42	85	
3	Stevenage Borough	42	24	10	8	87	53	+34	82	
4	Morecambe	42	19	9	14	69	56	+13	66	
5	Woking	42	18	10	14	71	63	+8	64	
6	Northwich Victoria	42	17	12	13	61	54	+7	63	
7	Farnborough Town	42	16	13	13	58	53	+5	61	
8	Hednesford Town	42	16	12	14	52	50	+2	60	
9	Telford United	42	16	10	16	46	56	−10	58	
10	Gateshead	42	15	11	16	59	63	−4	56	
11	Southport	42	15	10	17	51	61	−10	55	
12	Rushden & Diamonds	42	14	11	17	61	63	−2	53	
13	Stalybridge Celtic	42	14	10	18	53	58	−5	52	
14	Kettering Town	42	14	9	19	53	62	−9	51	
15	Hayes	42	12	14	16	54	55	−1	50	
16	Slough Town	42	12	14	16	62	65	−3	50	
17	Dover Athletic	42	12	14	16	57	68	−11	50	
18	Welling United	42	13	9	20	50	60	−10	48	
19	Halifax Town	42	12	12	18	55	74	−19	48	
20	Bath City (R)	42	12	11	19	53	80	−27	47	Relegation to the Southern League Premier Division
21	Bromsgrove Rovers (R)	42	12	5	25	41	67	−26	41	Relegation to the Southern League Premier Division
22	Altrincham (R)	42	9	12	21	49	73	−24	39	Relegation to the Northern Premier League Premier Division

(C) Champions; (P) Promoted; (R) Relegated

== Results ==
Home \ Away	ALT	BAT	BRO	DOV	FAR	GAT	HAL	HAY	HED	KET	KID	MAC	MOR	NOR	R&D	SLO	SOU	STL	STB	TEL	WEL	WOK
Altrincham		1–3	3–1	1–2	0–3	0–1	2–1	0–2	1–1	4–3	0–1	0–1	0–1	2–3	4–3	0–1	1–0	1–0	1–2	2–3	1–1	1–1
Bath City	1–2		1–0	2–1	1–1	3–0	0–0	3–1	2–1	0–2	0–3	0–3	2–1	3–2	3–2	0–0	0–2	0–2	0–0	2–3	3–1	3–1
Bromsgrove Rovers	4–0	2–1		3–1	1–1	2–2	3–0	2–2	1–0	1–2	0–1	0–3	2–3	0–5	0–1	4–1	0–1	0–1	1–1	2–1	1–0	0–3
Dover Athletic	2–2	2–2	2–0		0–0	0–1	2–2	1–0	2–2	0–1	0–5	2–1	3–0	2–2	1–1	0–0	0–1	2–1	3–3	1–4	2–1	5–1
Farnborough Town	1–1	4–1	2–1	2–3		1–2	3–0	1–1	1–0	0–2	2–1	0–1	2–2	2–2	2–2	2–1	3–3	1–0	3–1	0–2	2–1	1–2
Gateshead	1–1	5–0	1–0	1–3	1–0		0–1	1–1	0–1	1–1	3–1	0–0	0–3	5–1	1–0	2–1	2–2	0–2	2–2	2–3	1–2	3–2
Halifax Town	1–1	4–5	1–0	1–3	3–0	2–0		2–2	1–0	2–1	2–3	3–3	1–1	0–3	1–3	4–1	2–0	4–1	4–2	0–3	1–1	0–4
Hayes	3–1	0–1	1–0	2–0	0–0	0–0	0–0		4–0	2–1	0–1	0–2	2–3	1–1	1–1	5–0	1–1	0–2	1–3	0–1	1–1	3–2
Hednesford Town	2–2	2–0	3–0	1–1	0–1	0–0	1–1	2–0		0–0	1–4	4–1	2–1	3–0	1–0	2–1	0–1	2–1	0–0	0–0	0–3	2–0
Kettering Town	3–1	1–0	2–0	1–1	3–1	4–1	4–1	2–2	0–2		3–1	1–4	0–2	1–0	1–5	0–0	0–1	1–0	1–2	0–1	2–3	0–0
Kidderminster Harriers	1–1	6–0	1–2	4–1	2–3	3–2	3–0	5–1	2–1	4–0		0–0	2–2	1–0	1–0	1–2	3–0	1–1	3–0	1–0	3–2	1–0
Macclesfield Town	1–1	2–2	4–0	1–0	3–0	3–0	1–0	1–0	4–0	2–0	0–1		0–0	0–1	2–1	2–0	3–2	2–0	2–1	2–1	1–1	5–0
Morecambe	2–1	1–1	1–0	3–1	1–1	4–0	1–0	2–4	2–2	5–2	2–3	1–0		2–0	2–0	0–0	2–1	0–0	1–2	0–1	1–2	1–2
Northwich Victoria	2–2	1–0	1–0	2–0	1–1	4–2	2–2	2–1	2–1	2–1	1–1	2–1	1–0		1–2	0–1	5–1	0–1	0–1	1–0	0–0	1–2
Rushden & Diamonds	3–2	4–1	1–2	1–1	0–2	0–4	1–0	2–2	0–2	1–0	1–1	1–1	2–1	1–1		2–2	3–0	1–1	0–1	2–0	3–0	1–1
Slough Town	0–1	5–2	2–0	2–2	1–1	0–1	1–0	1–3	2–2	1–1	0–2	0–0	1–2	3–4	5–0		1–1	4–1	1–6	6–0	3–3	3–0
Southport	1–3	3–1	0–0	0–1	0–3	1–1	2–1	0–2	1–2	2–2	1–0	1–5	3–1	0–0	2–1	0–1		3–0	0–0	0–1	3–2	4–1
Stalybridge Celtic	1–0	2–2	3–0	4–2	2–0	2–5	2–3	3–1	1–2	3–1	4–1	0–1	2–1	0–1	2–0	2–2	2–2		0–3	0–0	0–0	0–2
Stevenage Borough	2–1	2–1	3–0	4–1	3–1	4–1	6–0	2–0	3–2	0–0	2–2	2–3	4–2	2–0	4–1	2–2	2–1	1–1		3–0	2–1	0–3
Telford United	0–0	1–1	3–1	1–0	2–0	0–3	1–1	0–0	1–1	1–0	0–2	0–3	2–3	2–2	0–5	0–2	1–0	1–1	2–3		2–0	1–2
Welling United	1–0	2–0	1–2	1–0	0–2	2–0	0–1	1–0	1–2	1–2	0–1	0–3	1–4	1–1	0–1	3–2	2–3	2–0	2–0	2–1		1–1
Woking	7–1	2–2	1–3	1–1	0–2	1–1	2–2	1–2	2–0	2–1	2–1	2–3	1–2	3–1	4–2	2–0	0–1	3–2	3–1	0–0	2–1	

Updated to match(es) played on unknown. Source: Glenda Rollin (ed.), Jack Rollin (exec. ed.), Rothmans Football Yearbook 1997–98. Headline, 1997.
Legend: Blue = home team win; Yellow = draw; Red = away team win.
Locations of the Football Conference 1996–1997 teams
Locations of the Football Conference teams 1996–1997

== Promotion and relegation ==
=== Promoted ===
- Macclesfield Town (to the Football League Third Division)
- Cheltenham Town (from the Southern Premier League)
- Leek Town (from the Northern Premier League)
- Yeovil Town (from the Isthmian League)

=== Relegated ===
- Hereford United (from the Football League Third Division)
- Altrincham (to the Northern Premier League)
- Bath City (to the Southern Premier League)
- Bromsgrove Rovers (to the Southern Premier League)

== Top scorers in order of league goals ==
Rank	Player	Club	League	FA Cup	FA Trophy	League Cup	Total
1	(England) Lee Hughes	Kidderminster Harriers	30	1	2	1	34
2	(Jamaica) Lennie Dennis	Welling United	21	1	1	2	25
3	(England) Andy Whittaker	Southport	19	6	2	0	27
4	(England) Gary Abbott	Slough Town	18	0	0	0	18
5	(England) Justin Jackson	Woking	17	4	2	0	23
6	(Jamaica) Barry Hayles	Stevenage Borough	16	3	2	0	21
=	(England) David Leworthy	Rushden & Diamonds	16	4	0	0	20
=	(England) Lee Steele	Northwich Victoria	16	0	0	0	16
9	(England) Joe O'Connor	Hednesford	15	9	0	0	24
=	(England) Paul Thompson	Gateshead	15	6	1	1	23
=	(England) Clive Walker	Woking	15	3	1	0	19
=	(England) Steve Wood	Macclesfield Town	15	0	0	1	16
13	(England) Mike Davis	Bath City	14	7	0	0	21
=	(England) Neil Doherty	Kidderminster Harriers	14	1	1	0	16
=	(England) Niell Hardy	Altrincham	14	3	1	0	18
=	(England) Mickey Norbury	Halifax Town	14	0	0	0	14
17	(England) Carl Alford	Rushden & Diamonds	13	2	0	0	15
=	(England) Ian Arnold	Stalybridge Celtic	13	0	0	0	13
=	(England) Chris Boothe	Farnborough Town	13	9	0	3	25
=	(England) Martin Randall	Hayes	13	0	4	0	17
=	(England) Phil Wingfield	Farnborough Town	13	2	1	0	16
