= 1994–95 Football Conference =

Football Conference
- Season: 1994–95
- Champions: Macclesfield Town (1st Football Conference title)
- Promoted to the Football League: None
- Conference League Cup winners: Bromsgrove Rovers
- FA Trophy winners: Woking (2nd year running)
- Relegated to Level 6: Merthyr Tydfil, Stafford Rangers, Yeovil Town
- Matches: 462
- Goals: 1,348 (2.92 per match)
- Top goalscorer: (England) Paul Dobson (Gateshead), 25
- Biggest home win: Halifax Town – Stafford Rangers 6–0 (5 November 1994)
- Biggest away win: Welling United – Bath City 1–5 (28 January 1995); Welling United – Northwich Victoria 1–5 (19 November 1994); Dagenham & Redbridge – Altrincham 0–4 (4 February 1995); Dagenham & Redbridge – Macclesfield Town 0–4 (19 November 1994); Farnborough Town – Runcorn 0–4 (24 September 1994); Telford United – Dagenham & Redbridge 0–4 (18 February 1995)
- Highest scoring: Bromsgrove Rovers – Woking 5–5 (14 January 1995)
- Longest winning run: Macclesfield Town, 10 matches (Conference record)
- Longest unbeaten run: Macclesfield Town, 13 matches
- Longest losing run: Stafford Rangers, Yeovil Town, 6 matches
- Highest attendance: Kidderminster Harriers v Bromsgrove Rovers, 4,347 (26 December 1994)
- Lowest attendance: ?
- Average attendance: 1,064

The Football Conference season of 1994–95 was the sixteenth season of the Football Conference, also known as the Vauxhall Conference for sponsorship reasons.

== Overview ==
Macclesfield Town finished the season as Conference champions, but failed to gain Football League status as their stadium failed to meet the capacity requirements. This meant that the bottom placed Third Division club, Exeter City, avoided relegation to the Conference.

== New teams in the league this season ==
- Farnborough Town (promoted 1993–94)
- Stevenage Borough (promoted 1993–94)

== Final league table ==
Pos	Team	Pld	W	D	L	GF	GA	GD	Pts	Qualification or relegation
1	Macclesfield Town (C)	42	24	8	10	70	40	+30	80	No promotion (Note: Macclesfield Town were denied promotion to the Football League Third Division due to failing to meet Football League ground requirements.)
2	Woking	42	21	12	9	76	54	+22	75	
3	Southport	42	21	9	12	68	50	+18	72	
4	Altrincham	42	20	8	14	77	60	+17	68	
5	Stevenage Borough	42	20	7	15	68	49	+19	67	
6	Kettering Town	42	19	10	13	73	56	+17	67	
7	Gateshead	42	19	10	13	61	53	+8	67	
8	Halifax Town	42	17	12	13	68	54	+14	63	
9	Runcorn	42	16	10	16	59	71	−12	58	
10	Northwich Victoria	42	14	15	13	77	66	+11	57	
11	Kidderminster Harriers	42	16	9	17	63	61	+2	57	
12	Bath City	42	15	12	15	55	56	−1	57	
13	Bromsgrove Rovers	42	14	13	15	66	69	−3	55	
14	Farnborough Town	42	15	10	17	45	64	−19	55	
15	Dagenham & Redbridge	42	13	13	16	56	69	−13	52	
16	Dover Athletic	42	11	16	15	48	55	−7	49	
17	Welling United	42	13	10	19	57	74	−17	49	
18	Stalybridge Celtic	42	11	14	17	52	72	−20	47	
19	Telford United	42	10	16	16	53	62	−9	46	
20	Merthyr Tydfil (R)	42	11	11	20	53	63	−10	44	Relegation to the Southern League Premier Division
21	Stafford Rangers (R)	42	9	11	22	53	79	−26	38	Relegation to the Southern League Premier Division
22	Yeovil Town (R)	42	8	14	20	50	71	−21	37 (Note: Yeovil Town were deducted 1 point for fielding an ineligible player.)	Relegation to the Isthmian League Premier Division

(C) Champions; (R) Relegated

== Results ==
Home \ Away	ALT	BAT	BRO	D&R	DOV	FAR	GAT	HAL	KET	KID	MAC	MER	NOR	RUN	SOU	STA	STL	STB	TEL	WEL	WOK	YEO
Altrincham		1–0	1–1	0–1	3–0	2–0	1–3	3–1	2–4	2–0	1–2	1–0	1–3	3–2	0–0	5–1	1–0	1–2	3–1	1–1	1–2	1–3
Bath City	0–3		1–1	3–0	0–0	2–0	0–2	0–0	2–0	3–5	1–0	1–0	2–2	4–3	1–2	3–3	2–3	2–1	1–1	2–0	2–0	3–0
Bromsgrove Rovers	0–3	1–1		2–2	2–0	2–2	2–2	0–1	2–4	4–3	2–2	2–0	1–4	1–0	1–1	2–1	2–1	2–1	0–1	4–1	5–5	5–0
Dagenham & Redbridge	0–4	1–0	2–0		2–0	0–1	0–0	1–4	2–1	1–2	0–4	2–1	1–2	3–2	5–1	3–3	2–2	0–1	3–2	0–0	0–2	0–0
Dover Athletic	1–3	3–0	0–2	1–1		1–1	2–2	1–1	0–2	1–0	0–0	2–2	3–1	1–1	1–2	3–2	0–0	2–0	2–0	1–1	2–3	1–1
Farnborough Town	2–3	0–0	0–3	1–3	1–0		3–1	2–0	0–0	1–0	1–0	2–1	2–1	0–4	1–4	0–0	0–0	1–1	5–3	1–2	0–2	0–3
Gateshead	1–0	0–1	2–1	2–1	1–0	2–0		1–2	0–0	1–0	2–1	2–0	4–0	4–0	0–1	1–1	0–0	1–2	0–0	2–0	2–0	0–3
Halifax Town	1–1	4–2	4–2	1–1	4–0	0–1	3–2		2–1	1–2	0–1	2–2	0–0	4–0	2–0	6–0	1–1	0–2	1–1	4–0	4–0	2–1
Kettering Town	2–2	0–0	0–1	2–2	1–0	4–1	2–4	5–1		0–0	1–0	4–1	3–3	3–0	1–0	1–0	1–0	0–2	3–2	4–3	0–1	3–2
Kidderminster Harriers	2–2	2–1	0–1	1–1	0–0	0–1	2–3	3–0	1–3		1–2	2–0	1–2	1–1	0–1	1–2	3–2	0–3	1–1	3–0	1–3	3–0
Macclesfield Town	4–2	1–0	2–2	2–0	3–0	4–1	2–1	1–1	1–0	1–3		0–0	3–1	0–1	3–0	1–2	3–0	0–3	2–0	3–1	2–0	1–0
Merthyr Tydfil	2–5	2–0	2–1	2–0	2–3	1–1	1–2	2–0	2–1	0–1	1–2		2–0	3–0	1–2	4–1	4–2	2–2	3–1	0–2	1–1	0–0
Northwich Victoria	1–1	1–1	3–1	5–0	1–3	1–2	1–1	3–0	3–2	3–4	1–3	2–0		4–1	2–1	0–1	2–2	0–1	1–1	1–1	2–2	2–2
Runcorn	3–0	1–1	3–1	0–0	3–3	1–0	3–2	0–3	1–2	2–2	2–2	0–0	2–2		2–1	3–1	0–3	3–1	4–1	3–2	1–0	2–1
Southport	1–4	3–1	2–1	1–1	2–2	0–1	5–0	4–0	1–1	4–1	2–3	3–1	0–2	5–0		3–0	3–1	2–1	2–1	1–0	2–0	0–0
Stafford Rangers	0–1	0–2	1–1	1–2	1–0	1–1	3–1	0–1	2–3	1–2	0–3	2–1	1–3	1–2	1–1		5–0	0–3	2–2	1–1	2–3	4–1
Stalybridge Celtic	2–1	0–1	1–1	1–0	2–1	4–1	0–1	1–0	1–4	1–3	2–2	1–1	2–1	0–0	1–1	2–3		1–0	1–0	1–3	2–1	3–1
Stevenage Borough	4–2	3–0	1–0	3–1	0–3	3–1	2–3	1–0	2–2	2–3	1–1	0–0	1–1	0–1	1–2	1–0	5–1		4–3	1–2	0–1	5–0
Telford United	2–3	3–0	2–2	0–4	1–1	1–1	3–1	1–1	1–0	3–1	2–0	1–1	1–0	2–0	0–0	0–0	1–1	1–2		4–2	0–0	1–0
Welling United	0–0	1–5	1–2	4–1	0–1	1–3	3–0	1–1	2–1	0–2	0–1	2–1	1–5	1–2	3–1	3–1	3–3	1–0	1–0		1–2	2–1
Woking	4–0	2–2	4–0	3–5	0–0	3–2	1–1	1–3	3–1	0–0	1–0	4–1	1–1	2–0	3–0	2–2	4–1	3–0	2–1	1–1		2–2
Yeovil Town	1–3	1–2	2–0	2–2	1–3	0–1	1–1	3–1	1–1	1–1	1–2	1–3	4–4	1–0	0–1	1–0	3–0	0–0	1–1	3–3	1–2	

Updated to match(es) played on unknown. Source: Jack Rollin (ed.), Glenda Rollin (ass. ed.), Rothmans Football Yearbook 1995–96. Headline, 1995.
Legend: Blue = home team win; Yellow = draw; Red = away team win.
Locations of the Football Conference 1994–1995 teams
Locations of the Football Conference teams 1994–1995

== Promotion and relegation ==
=== Promoted ===
- Hednesford Town (from the Southern Premier League)
- Morecambe (from the Northern Premier League)
- Slough Town (from the Isthmian League)

=== Relegated ===
- Merthyr Tydfil (to the Southern Premier League)
- Stafford Rangers (to the Northern Premier League)
- Yeovil Town (to the Isthmian League)

== Top scorers in order of league goals ==
Rank	Player	Club	League	FA Cup	FA Trophy	League Cup	Total
1	(England) Paul Dobson	Gateshead	25	2	3	2	32
2	v Carl Alford	Kettering Town	23	1	0	3	27
3	(England) Leroy May	Stafford Rangers	21	0	0	1	22
4	(England) Andy Green	Altrincham	19	2	0	0	21
=	(England) Clive Walker	Woking	19	1	5	0	25
6	(England) Recky Carter	Bromsgrove Rovers	18	0	0	12	30
=	(England) David Leworthy	Dover Athletic	18	5	0	2	25
=	(England) Phil Power	Macclesfield Town	18	0	3	2	23
=	(England) Malcolm O'Connor	Northwich Victoria	18	4	1	0	23
10	(England) Darran Hay	Woking	17	0	0	0	17
11	(England) Dean Birkby	Bath City	16	0	0	2	18
=	(England) Mark Hughes	Runcorn	16	0	2	1	19
13	(England) Paul Wilson	Woking	17	0	0	0	17
