= 1995–96 FA Trophy =

FA Challenge Trophy

Tournament details
- Country: England; Wales
- Teams: 176

Final positions
- Champions: Macclesfield Town
- Runners-up: Northwich Victoria

The 1995–96 FA Trophy was the twenty-seventh season of the FA Trophy.

== Calendar ==
| Round | Date | Matches | Clubs | New entries this round | Prize money |
|---|---|---|---|---|---|
| First Round Qualifying | 14 October 1995 | 48 | 176 → 128 | 96 | £1,500 |
| Second Round Qualifying | 4 November 1995 | 32 | 128 → 96 | 16 | £2,000 |
| Third Round Qualifying | 25 November 1995 | 32 | 96 → 64 | 32 | £3,000 |
| First Round | 20 January 1996 | 32 | 64 → 32 | 32 | £4,000 |
| Second Round | 10 February 1996 | 16 | 32 → 16 | none | £5,000 |
| Third Round | 2 March 1996 | 8 | 16 → 8 | none | £6,000 |
| Fourth Round | 23 March 1996 | 4 | 8 → 4 | none | £8,000 |
| Semi-finals | 13 April and 20 April 1996 | 2 | 4 → 2 | none | £16,000 |
| Final | 19 May 1996 | 1 | 2 → 1 | none | £50,000 |

== First qualifying round ==
=== Ties ===
| Tie | Home team | Score | Away team |
|---|---|---|---|
| 1 | Abingdon Town | 1-1 | Bishop's Stortford |
| 2 | Accrington Stanley | 2-2 | Bradford Park Avenue |
| 3 | Alfreton Town | 5–0 | Congleton Town |
| 4 | Ashford Town (Kent) | 0–2 | Sudbury Town |
| 5 | Atherstone United | 2–1 | Lincoln United |
| 6 | Atherton Laburnum Rovers | 1–2 | Chorley |
| 7 | Barking | 0-0 | Baldock Town |
| 8 | Barrow | 3–0 | Hinckley Town |
| 9 | Barton Rovers | 1–3 | Crawley Town |
| 10 | Bashley | 1-1 | Margate |
| 11 | Berkhamsted Town | 1–2 | Purfleet |
| 12 | Billericay Town | 0–4 | Wembley |
| 13 | Bridgnorth Town | 1-1 | Leigh R M I |
| 14 | Buckingham Town | 1-1 | Braintree Town |
| 15 | Bury Town | 1–2 | Trowbridge Town |
| 16 | Carshalton Athletic | 1-1 | Dulwich Hamlet |
| 17 | Chertsey Town | 9–0 | Poole Town |
| 18 | Curzon Ashton | 4–3 | Worksop Town |
| 19 | Droylsden | 0–3 | Matlock Town |
| 20 | Erith & Belvedere | 0–6 | Basingstoke Town |
| 21 | Fareham Town | 2–4 | Maidenhead United |
| 22 | Farsley Celtic | 3–1 | Bedworth United |
| 23 | Fleetwood | 2–1 | Whitley Bay |
| 24 | Forest Green Rovers | 1–2 | Sittingbourne |
| 25 | Harrogate Town | 1–4 | Grantham Town |
| 26 | Harrow Borough | 1-1 | Marlow |
| 27 | Hastings Town | 2-2 | Havant Town |
| 28 | Hendon | 2-2 | Waterlooville |
| 29 | King's Lynn | 1–2 | Uxbridge |
| 30 | Knowsley United | 3–2 | Moor Green |
| 31 | Lancaster City | 3–0 | Solihull Borough |
| 32 | Leyton Pennant | 0–1 | Fleet Town |
| 33 | Newport I O W | 1–3 | Chesham United |
| 34 | Racing Club Warwick | 1–0 | Warrington Town |
| 35 | Radcliffe Borough | 3–1 | Redditch United |
| 36 | Ruislip Manor | 3–1 | Cinderford Town |
| 37 | Salisbury City | 2–0 | Fisher |
| 38 | Staines Town | 2–1 | Wokingham Town |
| 39 | Stourbridge | 1–2 | Frickley Athletic |
| 40 | Sutton Coldfield Town | 1-1 | Bilston Town |
| 41 | Tamworth | w/o | Caernarfon Town |
| 42 | Weston Super Mare | 2–6 | Bognor Regis Town |
| 43 | Weymouth | 4–0 | Tonbridge Angels |
| 44 | Whyteleafe | 1–2 | Tooting & Mitcham United |
| 45 | Winsford United | 1-1 | Paget Rangers |
| 46 | Workington | 1-1 | Leicester United |
| 47 | Worthing | 1-1 | Thame United |
| 48 | Yate Town | 3–2 | Witney Town |

=== Replays ===
| Tie | Home team | Score | Away team |
|---|---|---|---|
| 1 | Bishop's Stortford | 5–1 | Abingdon Town |
| 2 | Bradford Park Avenue | 2–3 | Accrington Stanley |
| 7 | Baldock Town | 3–2 | Barking |
| 10 | Margate | 1–2 | Bashley |
| 13 | Leigh R M I | 7–0 | Bridgnorth Town |
| 14 | Braintree Town | 1–0 | Buckingham Town |
| 16 | Dulwich Hamlet | 1-1 | Carshalton Athletic |
| 26 | Marlow | 1–4 | Harrow Borough |
| 27 | Havant Town | 1–0 | Hastings Town |
| 28 | Waterlooville | 0–1 | Hendon |
| 40 | Bilston Town | 4-4 | Sutton Coldfield Town |
| 45 | Paget Rangers | 0–2 | Winsford United |
| 46 | Leicester United | 5–0 | Workington |
| 47 | Thame United | 2–0 | Worthing |

=== 2nd replays ===
| Tie | Home team | Score | Away team |
|---|---|---|---|
| 16 | Dulwich Hamlet | 1–2 | Carshalton Athletic |
| 40 | Bilston Town | 2–1 | Sutton Coldfield Town |

== Second qualifying round ==
=== Ties ===
| Tie | Home team | Score | Away team |
|---|---|---|---|
| 1 | Alfreton Town | 2-2 | Dudley Town |
| 2 | Atherstone United | 1–3 | Accrington Stanley |
| 3 | Barrow | 0–1 | Winsford United |
| 4 | Basingstoke Town | 0–2 | Uxbridge |
| 5 | Bilston Town | 5–2 | Leicester United |
| 6 | Bognor Regis Town | 2-2 | Sittingbourne |
| 7 | Braintree Town | 4–0 | Harrow Borough |
| 8 | Carshalton Athletic | 5–1 | Weymouth |
| 9 | Chertsey Town | 2-2 | Chesham United |
| 10 | Clevedon Town | 0–4 | Worcester City |
| 11 | Crawley Town | 0–1 | Bashley |
| 12 | Curzon Ashton | 1-1 | Lancaster City |
| 13 | Eastwood Town | 0–1 | Chorley |
| 14 | Emley | 2–1 | Racing Club Warwick |
| 15 | Evesham United | 0–2 | Aldershot Town |
| 16 | Grantham Town | 1–3 | Farsley Celtic |
| 17 | Great Harwood Town | 3–2 | Frickley Athletic |
| 18 | Hendon | 3–0 | Gravesend & Northfleet |
| 19 | Leigh R M I | 0–2 | Matlock Town |
| 20 | Maidenhead United | 0–5 | Thame United |
| 21 | Newport A F C | 2–1 | Fleet Town |
| 22 | Nuneaton Borough | 3–2 | Knowsley United |
| 23 | Purfleet | 6–1 | Corby Town |
| 24 | Radcliffe Borough | 2–0 | Fleetwood |
| 25 | Salisbury City | 2-2 | Sudbury Town |
| 26 | Staines Town | 3–1 | Havant Town |
| 27 | Tamworth | 3–1 | Netherfield |
| 28 | Tooting & Mitcham United | 2–1 | Baldock Town |
| 29 | Trowbridge Town | 1–0 | Bishop's Stortford |
| 30 | Walton & Hersham | 0-0 | Oxford City |
| 31 | Wembley | 1-1 | Ruislip Manor |
| 32 | Yate Town | 1–2 | Heybridge Swifts |

=== Replays ===
| Tie | Home team | Score | Away team |
|---|---|---|---|
| 2 | Dudley Town | 2–0 | Alfreton Town |
| 6 | Sittingbourne | 1–2 | Bognor Regis Town |
| 9 | Chesham United | 2–3 | Chertsey Town |
| 12 | Lancaster City | 3–0 | Curzon Ashton |
| 25 | Sudbury Town | 2-2 | Salisbury City |
| 30 | Oxford City | 5–2 | Walton & Hersham |
| 31 | Ruislip Manor | 1–2 | Wembley |

=== 2nd replay ===
| Tie | Home team | Score | Away team |
|---|---|---|---|
| 25 | Sudbury Town | 3–2 | Salisbury City |

== Third qualifying round ==
=== Ties ===
| Tie | Home team | Score | Away team |
|---|---|---|---|
| 1 | Accrington Stanley | 2–3 | Gresley Rovers |
| 2 | Ashton United | 1-1 | Lancaster City |
| 3 | Bishop Auckland | 0-0 | Witton Albion |
| 4 | Blyth Spartans | 3–2 | Gretna |
| 5 | Boreham Wood | 3–0 | Heybridge Swifts |
| 6 | Bromley | 1-1 | Oxford City |
| 7 | Burton Albion | 3-3 | Bamber Bridge |
| 8 | Cambridge City | 2–0 | Hendon |
| 9 | Carshalton Athletic | 1-1 | Braintree Town |
| 10 | Chelmsford City | 2–1 | Yeading |
| 11 | Chertsey Town | 0–1 | Purfleet |
| 12 | Chorley | 3–1 | Winsford United |
| 13 | Dorchester Town | 2–3 | Hayes |
| 14 | Dudley Town | 4–3 | V S Rugby |
| 15 | Emley | 3–1 | Great Harwood Town |
| 16 | Gloucester City | 5–1 | Aldershot Town |
| 17 | Halesowen Town | 0-0 | Bilston Town |
| 18 | Hitchin Town | 1–2 | Bognor Regis Town |
| 19 | Ilkeston Town | 0–5 | Gainsborough Trinity |
| 20 | Leek Town | 0-0 | Boston United |
| 21 | Matlock Town | 1–0 | Buxton |
| 22 | Molesey | 2-2 | Staines Town |
| 23 | Newport A F C | 1–0 | Grays Athletic |
| 24 | Radcliffe Borough | 3–1 | Farsley Celtic |
| 25 | Rothwell Town | 3–2 | Uxbridge |
| 26 | Spennymoor United | 0–2 | Nuneaton Borough |
| 27 | St Albans City | 4–2 | Thame United |
| 28 | Stafford Rangers | 1-1 | Tamworth |
| 29 | Sudbury Town | 2–0 | Tooting & Mitcham United |
| 30 | Sutton United | 0–1 | Trowbridge Town |
| 31 | Wembley | 2–0 | Bashley |
| 32 | Worcester City | 3–0 | Aylesbury United |

=== Replays ===
| Tie | Home team | Score | Away team |
|---|---|---|---|
| 2 | Lancaster City | 0–2 | Ashton United |
| 3 | Witton Albion | 0-0 | Bishop Auckland |
| 6 | Oxford City | 3–2 | Bromley |
| 7 | Bamber Bridge | 2–3 | Burton Albion |
| 9 | Braintree Town | 0–5 | Carshalton Athletic |
| 17 | Bilston Town | 1–4 | Halesowen Town |
| 20 | Boston United | 2–0 | Leek Town |
| 22 | Staines Town | 5–0 | Molesey |
| 28 | Tamworth | 0–3 | Stafford Rangers |

=== 2nd replay ===
| Tie | Home team | Score | Away team |
|---|---|---|---|
| 3 | Bishop Auckland | 3–1 | Witton Albion |

== 1st round ==
The teams that given byes to this round are Woking, Macclesfield Town, Southport, Altrincham, Stevenage Borough, Kettering Town, Gateshead, Halifax Town, Runcorn, Northwich Victoria, Kidderminster Harriers, Bath City, Bromsgrove Rovers, Farnborough Town, Dagenham & Redbridge, Dover Athletic, Welling United, Stalybridge Celtic, Telford United, Hednesford Town, Morecambe, Slough Town, Merthyr Tydfil, Yeovil Town, Marine, Guiseley, Enfield, Cheltenham Town, Rushden & Diamonds, Hyde United, Colwyn Bay and Kingstonian.

=== Ties ===
| Tie | Home team | Score | Away team |
|---|---|---|---|
| 1 | Ashton United | 1–3 | Blyth Spartans |
| 2 | Bath City | 1-1 | Yeovil Town |
| 3 | Bognor Regis Town | 1–0 | Worcester City |
| 4 | Boston United | 1-1 | Chorley |
| 5 | Bromsgrove Rovers | 1–0 | Bishop Auckland |
| 6 | Burton Albion | 3–1 | Telford United |
| 7 | Cambridge City | 1–2 | Boreham Wood |
| 8 | Carshalton Athletic | 3–1 | Woking |
| 9 | Chelmsford City | 0–1 | Newport A F C |
| 10 | Colwyn Bay | 3-3 | Altrincham |
| 11 | Dover Athletic | 2-2 | Cheltenham Town |
| 12 | Dudley Town | 4–2 | Halesowen Town |
| 13 | Farnborough Town | 1-1 | Slough Town |
| 14 | Gainsborough Trinity | 4–1 | Nuneaton Borough |
| 15 | Gloucester City | 5–0 | Staines Town |
| 16 | Halifax Town | 2–1 | Southport |
| 17 | Hayes | 0-0 | Enfield |
| 18 | Hednesford Town | 1-1 | Northwich Victoria |
| 19 | Kettering Town | 1-1 | St Albans City |
| 20 | Kidderminster Harriers | 0-0 | Gateshead |
| 21 | Macclesfield Town | 1–0 | Runcorn |
| 22 | Marine | 0-0 | Hyde United |
| 23 | Morecambe | 2-2 | Emley |
| 24 | Oxford City | 1–2 | Merthyr Tydfil |
| 25 | Radcliffe Borough | 3–2 | Matlock Town |
| 26 | Rothwell Town | 2-2 | Welling United |
| 27 | Rushden & Diamonds | 0–1 | Purfleet |
| 28 | Stafford Rangers | 1-1 | Guiseley |
| 29 | Stalybridge Celtic | 1-1 | Gresley Rovers |
| 30 | Stevenage Borough | 3–2 | Dagenham & Redbridge |
| 31 | Trowbridge Town | 2-2 | Sudbury Town |
| 32 | Wembley | 2–1 | Kingstonian |

=== Replays ===
| Tie | Home team | Score | Away team |
|---|---|---|---|
| 2 | Yeovil Town | 2–3 | Bath City |
| 4 | Chorley | 2–1 | Boston United |
| 10 | Altrincham | 2–0 | Colwyn Bay |
| 11 | Cheltenham Town | 1-1 | Dover Athletic |
| 13 | Slough Town | 4–3 | Farnborough Town |
| 17 | Enfield | 2-2 | Hayes |
| 18 | Northwich Victoria | 2–0 | Hednesford Town |
| 19 | St Albans City | 2–3 | Kettering Town |
| 20 | Gateshead | 2–0 | Kidderminster Harriers |
| 22 | Hyde United | 0-0 | Marine |
| 23 | Emley | 3–1 | Morecambe |
| 26 | Welling United | 3–0 | Rothwell Town |
| 28 | Guiseley | 2–1 | Stafford Rangers |
| 29 | Gresley Rovers | 1–0 | Stalybridge Celtic |
| 31 | Sudbury Town | 1-1 | Trowbridge Town |

=== 2nd replays ===
| Tie | Home team | Score | Away team |
|---|---|---|---|
| 11 | Dover Athletic | 1–0 | Cheltenham Town |
| 17 | Enfield | 2-2 | Hayes |
| 22 | Hyde United | 3–0 | Marine |
| 31 | Trowbridge Town | 1-1 | Sudbury Town |

=== 3rd replays ===
| Tie | Home team | Score | Away team |
|---|---|---|---|
| 17 | Hayes | 2–0 | Enfield |
| 31 | Sudbury Town | 4–3 | Trowbridge Town |

== 2nd round ==
=== Ties ===
| Tie | Home team | Score | Away team |
|---|---|---|---|
| 1 | Bath City | 2–0 | Hayes |
| 2 | Blyth Spartans | 1–2 | Gresley Rovers |
| 3 | Bognor Regis Town | 1–3 | Radcliffe Borough |
| 4 | Boreham Wood | 2–1 | Dover Athletic |
| 5 | Carshalton Athletic | 2–1 | Newport A F C |
| 6 | Chorley | 2–0 | Gainsborough Trinity |
| 7 | Dudley Town | 1–2 | Merthyr Tydfil |
| 8 | Emley | 1–2 | Gateshead |
| 9 | Guiseley | 4–0 | Altrincham |
| 10 | Halifax Town | 0–1 | Bromsgrove Rovers |
| 11 | Hyde United | 4–1 | Welling United |
| 12 | Macclesfield Town | 2–1 | Purfleet |
| 13 | Slough Town | 1–2 | Kettering Town |
| 14 | Stevenage Borough | 2–1 | Burton Albion |
| 15 | Sudbury Town | 3–1 | Gloucester City |
| 16 | Wembley | 0–2 | Northwich Victoria |

== 3rd round ==
=== Ties ===
2 March 1996
| Tie | Home team | Score | Away team |
|---|---|---|---|
| 1 | Bath City (5) | 1-1 | Bromsgrove Rovers (5) |
| 2 | Boreham Wood (6) | 1-1 | Chorley (6) |
| 3 | Guiseley (6) | 1–2 | Gresley Rovers (6) |
| 4 | Hyde United (6) | 3–2 | Carshalton Athletic (6) |
| 5 | Macclesfield Town (5) | 1–0 | Sudbury Town (6) |
| 6 | Merthyr Tydfil (6) | 1-1 | Northwich Victoria (5) |
| 7 | Radcliffe Borough (7) | 1–2 | Gateshead (5) |
| 8 | Stevenage Borough (5) | 3–0 | Kettering Town (5) |

=== Replays ===
| Tie | Home team | Score | Away team |
|---|---|---|---|
| 1 | Bromsgrove Rovers | 2–1 | Bath City |
| 2 | Chorley | 4–3 | Boreham Wood |
| 6 | Northwich Victoria | 2-2 | Merthyr Tydfil |

=== 2nd replay ===
| Tie | Home team | Score | Away team |
|---|---|---|---|
| 6 | Northwich Victoria | 3–0 | Merthyr Tydfil |

== 4th round ==
=== Ties ===
23 March 1996
| Tie | Home team | Score | Away team |
|---|---|---|---|
| 1 | Bromsgrove Rovers (5) | 0–1 | Northwich Victoria (5) |
| 2 | Chorley (6) | 3–1 | Gateshead (5) |
| 3 | Gresley Rovers (6) | 0–2 | Macclesfield Town (5) |
| 4 | Hyde United (6) | 3–2 | Stevenage Borough (5) |

== Semi finals ==
=== First leg ===
13 April 1996
| Tie | Home team | Score | Away team |
|---|---|---|---|
| 1 | Hyde United (6) | 1–2 | Northwich Victoria (5) |
| 2 | Macclesfield Town (5) | 3–1 | Chorley (6) |

=== Second leg ===
20 April 1996
| Tie | Home team | Score | Away team | Aggregate |
|---|---|---|---|---|
| 1 | Northwich Victoria (5) | 1–0 | Hyde United (6) | 3–1 |
| 2 | Chorley (6) | 1-1 | Macclesfield Town (5) | 2–4 |

== Final ==
=== Tie ===
19 May 1996
| Home team | Score | Away team |
|---|---|---|
| Northwich Victoria (5) (Williams) | 1–3 | Macclesfield Town (5) (Payne, Burgess OG, Hemmings) |
