= Macclesfield Town F.C. =

Association football club in Macclesfield, England

Macclesfield Town
- Full name: Macclesfield Town Football Club
- Nickname: The Silkmen
- Founded: 1874; 152 years ago (as Macclesfield F.C.)
- Dissolved: 16 September 2020; 6 years ago
- Ground: Moss Rose
- Capacity: 5,911 (2,375 seated)
Home colours	Away colours

Macclesfield Town Football Club was an association football club based in Macclesfield, Cheshire, England.

Initially known as Macclesfield F.C., the club was formed in 1874 and from 1891 played home games at Moss Rose. It competed in the short-lived Combination league in the 1890–91 season, reforming in the Manchester League at the end of the 19th century. The club won the Manchester League title twice, before becoming inaugural members of the Cheshire County League at the start of the 1919–20 season, ultimately winning the League six times. Renamed Macclesfield Town in 1946, the club were founder members of the Northern Premier League in 1968, winning the league in its first two years, as well as the FA Trophy in 1970. They were promoted to the Conference after they won their third Northern Premier League title in 1986–87.

Manager Sammy McIlroy led Macclesfield Town to the top of the Conference in 1993–94, but they were not promoted as Moss Rose did not meet Football League requirements. They won the FA Trophy for a second time in 1996. They again won the Conference title in 1996–97 and this time were promoted, winning promotion in their inaugural Football League campaign with a second-place finish in the Third Division in 1997–98. However they were immediately relegated from the Second Division. The club stayed in the fourth tier of the Football League from 1999 to 2012, losing a play-off semi-final in 2005, before being relegated back into the Conference. Despite financial constraints, manager John Askey led the club back into the Football League as champions of the National League in 2017–18. In 2018–19, the club avoided relegation back to the National League, but financial issues continued to affect it. After a points deduction activated on 11 August 2020, the club was relegated to the National League, the 5th tier of English football, for the 2020–21 season.

The club was wound-up after a High Court ruling on 16 September 2020, and the club was initially suspended and then expelled from the National League with effect from 12 October 2020. In October 2020, local businessman Robert Smethurst purchased the assets of Macclesfield Town, and established Macclesfield F.C., entering it into the North West Counties Football League in the 2021–22 season.

== History ==
=== 19th century ===
The beginnings of Macclesfield Town Football Club can be traced, at least in part, to the 8th Cheshire Rifle Volunteers who were formed in 1873 and played regularly in Macclesfield from October 1874. It was agreed at a public meeting on 21 October 1876 that the 8th Cheshire Rifle Volunteers and the Olympic Cricket club teams be merged to form Macclesfield F.C.; initially matches alternated between association and rugby rules. At the beginning of the 1878–79 Macclesfield United Football Club merged with Macclesfield Football Club. The club played in the FA Cup competition for the first time on 18 November 1882, losing 3–4 to Lockwood Brothers and first entered the Cheshire Senior Cup in the 1879–80 season, winning this competition for the first time on 22 March 1890 when they beat Nantwich 4–1 and went on to be winners on three more occasions before the turn of the century.

Macclesfield became members of The Combination at the start of the 1890–91 season and moved from Victoria Road to the Moss Rose on 12 September 1891 which remains the home of the Silkmen today. In July 1894 the first limited company, Macclesfield Football and Athletic Club Limited, was formed but only lasted until the end of the 1896–97 season when it was wound up and Macclesfield Football Club withdrew from The Combination due to financial constraints. For the 1897–98 season, and the following two seasons, local amateur side Hallefield moved their fixtures to the Moss Rose.

=== 1900 to World War II ===
Having re-formed, Macclesfield became members of the Manchester League for the 1900–01 season and were champions in the 1908–09 and 1910–11 seasons. They fielded two senior teams for the 1911–12 season, continuing in the Manchester League with the second team competing in the Lancashire Combination 2nd Division. Having withdrawn from the Manchester League at the end of the 1911–12 season, the club reverted to one senior team for the 1912–13 season which competed in the Lancashire Combination 2nd Division. They gained promotion as runners-up at the end of the 1913–14 season to compete in the 1st Division for the 1914–15 season. In line with all other football clubs after a decree by the government there was no further competitive football at the Moss Rose during hostilities.

Macclesfield became inaugural members of the Cheshire County League at the start of the 1919–20 season of which they were champions in the 1931–32 and 1932–33 seasons. In the 1933–34 season, Albert Valentine set an all-time club record scoring 83 goals in the season. The first ever manager, James Stevenson, was appointed for the 1936–37 season. Between 1900 and 1939 they won the Cheshire Senior Cup three times (1910–11, 1929–30 and 1934–35). Although a member of the Cheshire War-time League (1939 West Series and 1940 East Series), due to dwindling attendances and increasing debts Macclesfield withdrew from the league at the end of the 1939–40 season and no further football was played on the Moss Rose during the Second World War. It would be just prior to the 1946–47 season before the outstanding debts were settled.

=== 1946 to 1999 ===
When competitive football resumed after World War II, Macclesfield Town Football Club Ltd was formed and the club gained their current name. The club re-joined the Cheshire County League in 1946–47, playing their first game after reformation on 31 August 1946, a 2–0 defeat to Buxton. The club's form in the remainder of the 1940s was largely indifferent, with the exception of a Cheshire League Challenge Cup win in 1948. The 1950s proved more successful, with four trophies in as many years from 1951 to 1954, including the club's first Cheshire County League title in 20 years in 1953, though the team's fortunes faded in the latter half of the decade.

Macclesfield Town progressed through four qualifying rounds to make their first appearance in the FA Cup first round in 1960 under manager Frank Bowyer, but lost 7–2 to Southport. At the end of that season the club won the Cheshire County League, beginning a nine-year period in which they won three league titles and finished no lower than fifth, and in 1964 won the Cheshire County League by a record-equalling 13 point margin. The club reached the FA Cup third round for the first time in 1968, meeting First Division Fulham at Craven Cottage. Macclesfield Town lost 4–2, but the performance resulted in Macclesfield Town's Keith Goalen becoming the first non-league player to be named Footballer of the Month by the London Evening Standard.

The club were founder members of the Northern Premier League, one of three leagues at the fifth tier of English football, upon its creation in 1968. Macclesfield Town were champions in each of the first two seasons of the competition, finishing 12 points clear in 1968–69, and by goal average in 1969–70. The 1969–70 season also resulted in a trip to Wembley for the inaugural final of the FA Trophy, a knockout competition for non-league clubs. Macclesfield Town defeated Telford United 2–0 in front of more than 28,000 spectators to win the competition. A period of decline then followed, despite the performances of Willie Mailey in goal, and the side's fortunes reached a nadir when the club finished bottom of the Northern Premier League in 1979, a year when the stronger teams from the division formed the national Alliance Premier League (now known as the National League). The 1980s saw steady rebuilding. The club finished as Northern Premier League runners-up in the 1984–85 season.

Macclesfield Town's third Northern Premier League title in the 1986–87 season resulted in promotion to the Football Conference; they also lifted the League Challenge Cup and President's Cup. They finished in mid-table in their first Conference season, and eliminated two League teams, Carlisle and Rotherham, from the FA Cup. The club reached the FA Trophy final for the second time in 1989, facing Telford United. However, the team did not match the achievement of their predecessors 19 years earlier, losing 1–0. From a high of a fourth place league finish in 1989–90, Macclesfield Town's final standing diminished each season, and following a struggle against relegation in 1992–93, manager Peter Wragg was sacked, and replaced with former Manchester United midfielder Sammy McIlroy.

McIlroy took charge at the start of the 1993–94 season, and guided the club to the Football Conference championship in his second season as manager. However. the club was denied promotion to the English Football League because the Moss Rose did not meet league requirements of having a 6,000 total capacity including at least 1,000 seats by the League's deadline of 31 December 1994. Macclesfield Town won the Conference title again two seasons later in 1996–97, by which time the stadium had been upgraded and they were promoted to Division Three of the Football League in place of Hereford United.

Upon gaining League status, the club turned fully professional. Macclesfield Town's first League match was a 2–1 win at home to Torquay United on 9 August 1997. Town's first ever goal in the Football League was scored by Efe Sodje who also became Macclesfield Town's first Black player that day. The momentum of the Conference success continued, and, unbeaten at home in their first League season, Macclesfield Town finished runners-up in Division Three and were promoted for the second consecutive season, this time to Division Two. However, the higher level proved a step too far for the club, who finished the 1998–99 season bottom of Division Two and were relegated. McIlroy soon left to become the Northern Ireland national coach and was replaced by former Manchester United colleague Peter Davenport.

=== 2000 to 2020 ===
Chart of Macclesfield's table positions in the English Football League and National League

A dismal start to the following season cost Davenport his job though, and Gil Prescott took over for the remainder of the season, keeping Macclesfield Town clear of relegation. David Moss in turn succeeded Prescott as manager and delivered two decent mid-table finishes, but a bad start to the 2003–04 season resulted in his sacking. Club stalwart John Askey succeeded Moss initially on a temporary basis, and earned the job permanently with some promising early results. However, a terrible run of one win in three months meant that Askey's term as manager was short-lived.

In March 2004, with relegation to the Conference threatening, Macclesfield Town turned to the experienced 55-year-old Brian Horton to take charge. Horton reinvigorated Macclesfield Town who finished fifth in the 2004–05 season, resulting in a playoff place, but the team were eliminated in the semi-finals by Lincoln City. In 2005–06, the team finished an undistinguished 17th. Horton was sacked by the club in late September 2006, following a 12-game winless start to the season, leaving the club bottom of the Football League.

On 23 October 2006, Paul Ince was confirmed as Macclesfield Town's new player-manager. He lost his first match in charge 3–2 to Mansfield Town, and it took Macclesfield Town until 20 games into the season to record their first league win under Ince, on 5 December 2006. The team then went on a nine match unbeaten run, earning Ince the League Two Manager of the Month award for December 2006, and also securing an FA Cup tie against then English champions Chelsea away in the 3rd round of the FA Cup, which Town lost 6–1. They were then just able to survive after drawing 1–1 with Notts County on the final day of the 2006–07 season, after a poor run of results landed the team back in the relegation zone; this game also saw the last appearance (and booking) of Paul Ince as a professional footballer. On 24 June 2007, Ince resigned to become MK Dons manager.

On 29 June 2007, Ian Brightwell was announced as the new manager, with Asa Hartford as his assistant. Macclesfield Town started the 2007–08 season away with a 1–1 draw to former Premier League club Bradford City and narrowly lost 1–0 to another former Premier League team Leeds United in the first round of the Football League Cup. Away from the pitch, in January 2008, Chairman Rob Bickerton left the club after 7 years to join Shrewsbury Town. He was replaced by club supporter Mike Rance, with ex-player Andy Scott, founder of Bank Fashion Retail stores, as vice-chairman.

Following a poor run of results and with the club again flirting with the relegation zone to the Football Conference, on 27 February 2008, Brightwell and Hartford left the club with immediate effect. Keith Alexander was named as manager until the end of the season. Alexander kept the Silkmen in League Two following a run of four wins and three draws in nine games and was awarded a new two-year contract. On 3 March 2010, Macclesfield Town announced that manager Alexander had died at the age of 53. Alexander, who suffered a brain aneurysm in November 2003, died after arriving home from the League Two match at Notts County. Subsequently, on 13 April 2010, Macclesfield Town announced Gary Simpson, previously Alexander's assistant, as manager on a two-year contract in May 2011, which was subsequently extended by a further year. On 10 January 2011, it was announced that midfield player Richard Butcher had died aged 29. The club retired the number 21 shirt in his honour.

Macclesfield Town failed to win any match from the start of January 2012 until the end of the season (23 league and two FA Cup games; eight draws and 17 defeats). After defeat at Dagenham & Redbridge on 17 March continued a winless streak of 14 League matches, Simpson was asked to step down as manager by chairman Mike Rance, and was replaced by Brian Horton. However, Horton was unable to change Town's poor form and the team were relegated to the Conference Premier on 28 April 2012 following a home defeat to Burton Albion. Horton then left the club and Glyn Chamberlain took charge of the team for the final game of the season, before Steve King was appointed as manager on 21 May 2012. At the same time, it was announced that Andy Scott would stand down as deputy chairman with immediate effect, and that three other directors, including Rance, would stand down in due course.

On 5 January 2013, Macclesfield Town beat Championship Leaders Cardiff City in the FA Cup 3rd round 2–1. This gave them a place in the 4th round of the tournament for the first time in their 139-year history. Macclesfield Town were generally in or around the Conference National play-off places for much of the season, but a failure to secure a play-off spot resulted in the sacking of Steve King just before the season ended, with the club reappointing former manager John Askey as King's replacement.

Macclesfield regularly finished in the top half of the fifth tier despite financial difficulties and on 21 May 2017, the club visited Wembley Stadium for a fourth time, their first appearance since the stadium was rebuilt, losing the 2017 FA Trophy Final 3–2 against York City, who Askey would later go on to manage. A total of 7,698 Silkmen supporters attended the final. Macclesfield topped the National League table for the majority of the 2018/19 season and on 21 April 2018, the Silkmen beat Eastleigh 2–0 to win the title along with promotion back to the Football League after six years playing non-league football.

Following the departure of John Askey for Shrewsbury Town, Mark Yates was named as manager in June 2018. Yates departed the club in October 2018 after failing to win any of his first twelve league games in charge. After Danny Whitaker and Neil Howarth briefly took temporary charge, former Premier League and England defender Sol Campbell was appointed manager in November 2018. In his first managerial role, Campbell secured safety (and 22nd place) on the final day of the season with a draw against Cambridge United.

==== 2019–20 financial issues and relegation ====
In early 2019, off-pitch financial issues meant players were not paid for three months, with some players threatening to boycott the Cambridge game. Six players issued a winding-up order against the club, which was taken over by HM Revenue and Customs in September but the High Court hearing was adjourned 10 times. A hearing on 25 March 2020 was then postponed, due to the COVID-19 pandemic, to 17 June, when it was adjourned for an 11th time, to 9 September 2020.

Campbell left the club by mutual consent on 15 August 2019, with Daryl McMahon taking over as manager; Campbell later backed the HMRC winding-up bid, claiming to be owed £180,000.

In October 2019, players again went unpaid, seeking help from the EFL – which, in November, began a formal investigation into the club's failure to pay its players. A strike by first team players over the unpaid wages jeopardised Macclesfield's FA Cup first round tie against non-league Kingstonian at the Moss Rose on 10 November 2019, but the club fulfilled the fixture, fielding six youth team players and five loanees, losing the tie 4–0 amid protests from Macclesfield supporters, many of whom boycotted the game. Meanwhile, local businessman Joe Sealey, son of former Manchester United goalkeeper Les Sealey, said he wanted to buy the club, though the takeover later (21 November) stalled.

On 14 November 2019, Macclesfield was charged with misconduct by the EFL and referred to a disciplinary panel after failing to pay players. As some players remained unpaid, they said they would not play in the 16 November League Two fixture against Mansfield Town unless paid by 6pm GMT on 15 November. Most were paid so the game went ahead. Two weeks later, Macclesfield players again told the club's owner they would not train, or play on 7 December against Crewe Alexandra, if owed wages were not paid. The game was officially 'suspended' on 6 December, with the EFL triggering further disciplinary action. On 19 December, the EFL docked Macclesfield six points (with a further four-point deduction suspended) over this infraction, but after a January 2020 arbitration panel upheld a "lenient" penalty imposed on Bolton Wanderers for not fulfilling two 2019 fixtures, Maccclesfield Town appealed against its points deduction and the deduction was reduced to four points (with three suspended). The 21 December fixture against Plymouth Argyle was then postponed due to a Moss Rose ground safety issue; the EFL again charged the club with misconduct for failing to fulfil its fixture obligations.

Meanwhile, Macclesfield supporters set up a hardship fund, raising over £11,000 to provide short-term financial emergency support for players and non-playing staff, fearing their club could follow Bury F.C. into "extinction" and blaming owner Amar Alkhadi. He claimed to be in "advanced negotiations with various third parties" over a possible takeover of the club, and on 15 January 2020 said a bid to buy the club had been accepted in principle.

Frustrated by the club's financial position, with December's pay arriving late, manager McMahon resigned after four months in charge, on 2 January 2020, joining Dagenham & Redbridge the following day, along with assistant Steve Gritt. After Danny Whitaker took temporary charge, on 16 January 2020, Mark Kennedy was appointed head coach. On 29 January, three Macclesfield players (Emmanuel Osadebe, Theo Vassell and Miles Welch-Hayes) approached the EFL and had their contracts terminated ahead of the transfer deadline. Club staff wages for February were also not paid on time, leading the PFA to contact the club. On 9 March, the club was charged with misconduct by the EFL for failing to pay players on time, and was referred to an independent disciplinary commission after failing to fulfil the Crewe and Plymouth fixtures. In April 2020, it was reported that the club had not paid its players for a fifth time, failing to pay March's wages, and later that the first team, backroom staff and most office staff had been put on furlough (temporary leave) due to the COVID-19 pandemic.

In May 2020, the club was given a seven-point deduction (with a further two-point deduction suspended) for failing to fulfil the Plymouth fixture in December 2019, and for failing to pay players' wages. After the Silkmen Supporters' Trust provided a loan of £10,000 to help towards the payment of players' wages for April, further misconduct charges were brought by the EFL on 1 June, relating to late payment of salaries in March. These latest charges left Macclesfield at risk of relegation as, on 9 June, an EFL EGM agreed outstanding promotion and relegation issues, with "ongoing disciplinary matters" meaning Macclesfield could go down in place of Stevenage if further points deductions were made. Continued uncertainty ahead of the disciplinary hearing on 19 June 2020 was reported to be affecting the mental health of the club's players and staff, and having an impact on the club's potential sale to Joe Sealey, who said he would only be interested if EFL status was retained. On 1 June, Macclesfield received a two-point deduction – retaining the club's League Two status – along with a suspended four-point deduction and a £20,000 fine plus costs. However, on 3 July, the EFL said it would appeal against the independent disciplinary panel's sanctions on Macclesfield; the hearing was set for 11 August 2020. In the meantime, the club provided the EFL with a "robust" business plan showing sustainable future financial and management resources, and on 4 August, chairman Amar Alkadhi resigned his position.

On 11 August 2020, the club was relegated to the National League following the EFL's appeal. The suspended four-point deduction was activated, dropping Macclesfield to the bottom of the table, and reprieving Stevenage. The following day, manager Mark Kennedy and his assistant resigned.

== 2020 winding-up order ==
On 9 September 2020, the High Court granted Macclesfield a seven-day extension (effectively a 12th adjournment) to a winding-up petition over unpaid tax to give time for a possible takeover of the club by Robert Benwell (previously linked with a move to buy Bury F.C.). If the takeover – said to be at "an advanced stage" – fell through, current owner Amar Alkadhi said outstanding debts would be paid (HMRC was owed £188,721.09, with eight creditors owed £592,000).

On 16 September 2020, the High Court made a winding-up order against the club, pushing the club into liquidation. Judge Sebastian Prentis made the order after receiving no evidence relating to the club's sale or satisfactory evidence of the club's ability to pay creditors, saying "nothing gives me comfort that the club can pay its debts in a reasonable period".

The Silkmen Supporters' Trust were reported to be exploring what actions they could take to save the club, and to be seeking a meeting with the receiver. However, on 29 September 2020, the club was suspended by the National League and its first three scheduled games were postponed, pending a notice of expulsion taking effect from 12 October 2020.

The club's final match was a 2–1 victory in a friendly match at Cheshire neighbours Witton Albion on 15 September 2020.

=== Macclesfield Football Club establishment ===
On 13 October 2020, the official receiver confirmed that the assets of Macclesfield Town had been sold to Macc Football Club Limited. Local businessman (and owner of 10th tier Stockport Town) Robert Smethurst had purchased the assets, intending to establish a new club, Macclesfield Football Club, and enter the North West Counties Football League in the 2021–22 campaign. Former Wales international Robbie Savage, then a Stockport Town player, joined the club's board, and former Town player Danny Whittaker became team manager.

== Kit and badge ==
Macclesfield Town's colours were blue and white; the club have used combinations of these colours since 1947, with the exception of the 1975–76 season, when the team wore tangerine and black as part of a sponsorship deal. Earlier incarnations of the club wore several colours. The first Macclesfield kit was amber and black stripes, but between 1882 and 1947 the club also used red and white, red, yellow and blue, blue and white, and black and white. The club currently play in a blue home shirt and a black away shirt. Their sponsors include ZAM and Macclesfield College.

The club crest is based upon the coat of arms of Macclesfield, and features a blue Lion Rampant holding a wheatsheaf. A new club crest was planned for the start of the 2007–08 season. However, many loyal supporters were not happy with the modern design so the plans were delayed and a re-designed badge was introduced in early 2008, which won the approval of the majority of fans.

== Stadium ==
Macclesfield Town played their home games at the Moss Rose stadium in the south of the town from 1891. The first game at the ground adjoining the then named Moss Rose Inn took place on 12 September 1891. Before moving to the Moss Rose, three other grounds were used: Macclesfield Grammar School, Rostron's Field (near Coare Street) and Victoria Road (then known as Bowfield Lane).

The current capacity of the Moss Rose is 6,335, of which 2,599 is seated. The Silk FM Stand (traditionally known as the London Road or Main Stand) runs along one side of the pitch and consists of a seated grandstand with open air terracing to either side, and the opposite side is the seated Alfred McAlpine Stand. The club's most vociferous supporters congregate in the Star Lane End, which is a mixture of terracing and seating. Visiting supporters are housed in the open air Silkman End (named after a public house which formerly adjoined the terrace) and part of the McAlpine Stand.

The record attendance for Macclesfield Town at the Moss Rose is sometimes given as 7,002 for an FA Cup tie against Spennymoor United in 1968. Phythian's Saga of the Silkmen (p. 85) and the News of the World Football Annual both give the record attendance of Moss Rose games involving Macclesfield Town as 9,003, in the Cheshire Cup tie vs. Winsford United, 14 February 1948. The Macclesfield Times (19 February 1948) reported that 80 coachloads of supporters had arrived from Winsford. Euro 96 winners Germany used the Moss Rose as a training base during the championships.

In September 2007, the club made a statement about possibly relocating to a new stadium in the proposed 'South Macclesfield Development Area', approximately one mile south of the Moss Rose. However, with the club in the lower part of League Two, and as England lost the bid to host the 2018 World Cup (which would have helped the cause for a new stadium), the Moss Rose stadium remained the club's ground.

== Supporters and rivalries ==
During their spell as a Football League club, Macclesfield Town had a low level of support in comparison with other teams playing at the same level. The club's average attendance of 1,832 in the 2010–11 season was the lowest in Football League Two and the Football League; in 2019–2020, average attendance was 1,998—less than half of the averages achieved by nearby League Two rivals Port Vale and Crewe Alexandra. Reasons for this include the proximity of Macclesfield to cities with large football clubs such as Manchester and Liverpool, and a lack of historical success, as Macclesfield Town had only been a Football League club since 1997.

Most supporters are from Macclesfield and its environs with small pockets of fans from Norway, Japan, Port Talbot in south Wales and Fleet in Hampshire (The Southern Silkmen Lads – SSL). In April 2011, football magazine FourFourTwo voted Macclesfield Town supporters "League Two Best Away Fans".

Macclesfield Town's traditional rivals were Altrincham and Northwich Victoria, rivalries dating back to when all three clubs were in the Cheshire League, and later the Northern Premier League and Football Conference. Their closest rival in the Football League years has been Stockport County; however, as Stockport were relegated at the end of the 2010–11 season this rivalry was briefly interrupted. Following relegation for the Silkmen, this local derby was briefly resumed, until Stockport's relegation to the Conference North at the end of the 2012–13 season. Altrincham were promoted to the National League in the 2013/14 season; however, two years later, they were relegated to the National League North.

On 23 April 2021, local band and Macclesfield fans, Glass Ankle released a video for their song "Super Silkmen" which featured clips recorded by supporters whilst in COVID lockdown, as well as photos of former players and managers held in high esteem. Lyrics within the second verse reference the rivalries held with Crewe, Altrincham, and Stockport County.

== Club records ==
All records correct as at 29 September 2018.

- Highest Football League finish — 24th in Division Two (level 3) – (1998–99 season)
- Record Football League victory — 6–0 v. Stockport County (2005–06 season)
- Record Football League defeat — 8–0 v. West Ham United (Away) (2018–19 EFL Cup third round)
- Highest Football League home attendance — 6,381 v. Manchester City (1998–99 season)
- Lowest Football League home attendance — 1,035 v. Northampton Town (2009–10 season)
- Highest Overall away attendance — 41,434 v. Chelsea FA Cup 3rd Round (2006–07 season)
- Highest Football League away attendance — 31,086 v. Manchester City (1998–99 season)
- Lowest Football League away attendance — 1,210 v. Accrington Stanley (2009–10 season)
- Record transfer fee paid — £40,000 to Bury for Danny Swailes (2004–05 season)
- Record transfer fee received — £300,000 from Stockport County for Rickie Lambert (2002–03 season)

=== Record Football League appearances ===
- Most Football League appearances — 263, Darren Tinson (1997–98 to 2002–03 season) but see below for the club's all-time record holder, John Askey
- Youngest Football League appearance — 16 years 342 days, Elliott Hewitt (2010–11 season)
- Oldest Football League appearance — 39 years 196 days, Paul Ince (2006–07 season)

Name	Years	FL starts	FL sub	FL total
Darren Tinson	1997–2003	263	0	263
Matthew Tipton	2002–2010	140	55	195
Danny Whitaker	2001–2019	172	21	193
John Askey	1997–2003	136	45	181
Steve Hitchen	1997–2003	143	8	151
Steve Wood	1997–2001	129	22	151
Chris Priest	1999–2004	140	10	150
Nat Brown	2008–2011	147	2	149
Danny Adams	2000–2004	146	2	148
Izak Reid	2006–2011	132	2	134

- John Askey holds the all-time record for the total number of appearances – 679 matches (1984–85 to 2002–03 season) including Non-League, Football League and Cup matches.

=== Record Football League goalscorers ===
- Most Football League goals scored — 50, Matthew Tipton (2001–02 to 2009–10 season)
- Most Football League goals scored in a season — 22, Jon Parkin (2004–05 season)

Rank	Name	FL goals (FL Apps)
1	Matthew Tipton	50 (195)
2	John Askey	31 (181)
3	Jon Parkin	30 (65)
=4	Richie Barker	23 (58)
=4	Danny Whitaker	23 (171)
6	John Miles	21 (122)
=7	Gareth Evans	19 (82)
=7	Steve Wood	19 (151)
9	Lee Glover	18 (85)
=10	Hamza Bencherif	16 (60)
=10	Kevin McIntyre	16 (134)

- Albert Valentine scored the overall most goals in a season scoring 83 in the 1933–34 season.

In Macclesfield Town's first 14 seasons in the Football League (1997–98 to 2010–11 season), they played 644 games, winning 204, drawing 181 and losing 259 games. They scored 750 and conceded 883 goals, and used 215 players.

Chris Priest, a Macclesfield Town player, scored the final goal of the 2nd millennium AD.

=== Retired numbers ===
21 – (England) Richard Butcher. Midfielder (2010–11) – posthumous honour

== Honours ==
League

- Third Division (level 4)
  - Runners-up: 1997–98
- Football Conference / National League (level 5)
  - Champions: 1994–95, 1996–97, 2017–18
- Northern Premier League
  - Champions: 1968–69, 1969–70, 1986–87
- Cheshire County League
  - Champions: 1931–32, 1932–33, 1952–53, 1960–61, 1963–64,
  - Runner-up: 1933–34, 1961–62, 1964–65
- Manchester League
  - Champions: 1908–09, 1910–11

Cup

- FA Trophy
  - Winners: 1969–70, 1995–96
  - Runners-up: 1988–89, 2016–17
- Conference League Cup
  - Winners: 1993–94
- Northern Premier League Challenge Cup
  - Winners: 1986–87
- Northern Premier League President's Cup
  - Winners: 1986–87
- Cheshire Senior Cup
  - Winners: 1889–90, 1890–91, 1893–94, 1895–96, 1910–11, 1929–30, 1934–35, 1950–51, 1951–52, 1953–54, 1959–60, 1963–64, 1968–69, 1970–71, 1972–73, 1982–83, 1990–91, 1991–92, 1997–98, 1999–2000, 2014–15
- Staffordshire Senior Cup
  - Winners: 1992–93, 1995–96

== Sources and references ==
- Macclesfield Town at the Football Club History Database
