= List of FA Trophy finals =

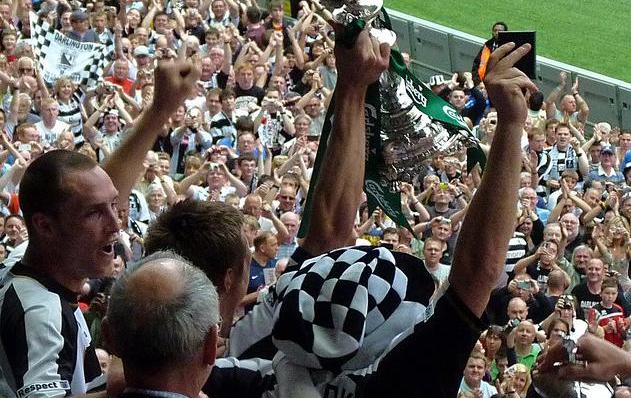
Darlington players celebrate their team's victory in the final in 2011

The Football Association Challenge Trophy, commonly known as the FA Trophy, is a knockout cup competition in English football, organised by and named after The Football Association (the FA). It was staged for the first time in the 1969–70 season, and was initially open to all semi-professional teams, complementing the existing FA Amateur Cup. After the abolition of official amateur status by the FA in 1974, the leading teams from the Amateur Cup entered the Trophy, while lower-level teams competed in the new FA Vase. As of 2008, the Trophy is open to all clubs in the top four levels of the National League System, equivalent to levels five to eight of the overall English football league system, although a club's home stadium must meet certain requirements before the club can enter the tournament.

The record for the most wins is jointly held by Scarborough, Telford United, and Woking, with three each. Scarborough and Telford United are both defunct and therefore not able to add any further wins. Scarborough, Woking, Grays Athletic and Kingstonian have each won the Trophy in two consecutive seasons. Mark Stimson managed the winning team in three consecutive finals. The Trophy is currently held by Southend United, who beat Wealdstone in the 2026 final.

== History ==
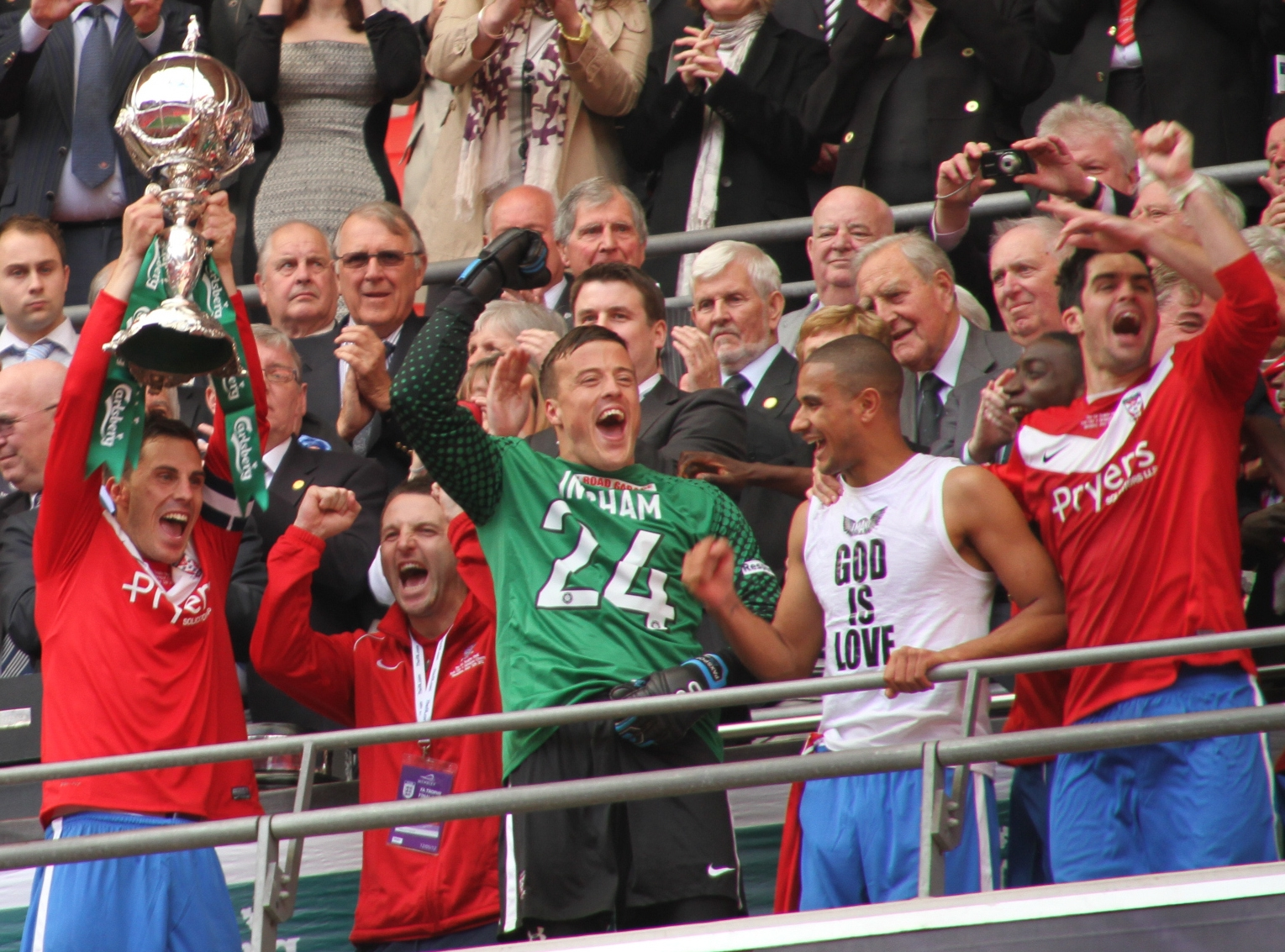
York City players celebrate winning the Trophy in 2012

The first FA Trophy final was won by Macclesfield Town, who also won the championship of the Northern Premier League in the same season. Northern Premier League clubs dominated the first decade of the competition, with Telford United the only Southern League team to break the northern clubs' hold on the competition. Scarborough reached the final four times in five seasons and won the Trophy three times between 1973 and 1977. In 1979, the leading Southern and Northern Premier League teams formed the new Alliance Premier League, and teams from this league dominated the Trophy during the 1980s. In the 1980–81 season, however, Bishop's Stortford of the comparatively lowly Isthmian League First Division won through nine rounds to reach the final, where they beat Sutton United. Telford United's win in 1989 made them the second team to win the Trophy three times.

Between 1990 and 2000, a smaller number of clubs claimed the Trophy, as Wycombe Wanderers and Kingstonian each won the competition twice, and Woking became the third team to win it three times. Manager Geoff Chapple led Woking and Kingstonian to all their victories, a total of five wins in seven seasons. After Chapple's period of success, Mark Stimson became the first man to manage the Trophy-winning team in three successive seasons, when he led Grays Athletic to victory in 2005 and 2006 and repeated the feat with his new club Stevenage Borough in 2007. In 2019 AFC Fylde became the first team to have won both the FA Trophy and FA Vase. The 2020 final was delayed until May 2021 due to the COVID-19 pandemic and won by Harrogate Town, who in the intervening period had been promoted to the English Football League, making them the only EFL team to lift the trophy. Less than three weeks later, Hornchurch became the first club playing at tier seven of the English football league system to win the trophy. They defeated Hereford 3–1 in the 2021 final.

== Finals ==
Originally, if the final finished with the scores level after extra time, the teams would play again in a replay at a later date; more recently the final has always been decided on the day, with a penalty shootout as required. The winning club receives the FA Trophy itself and, as of 2021, prize money of £60,000, in addition to that accumulated for winning earlier rounds.

=== Key ===
| (R) | Replay |
| * | Match went to extra time |
| † | Match decided by a penalty shootout after extra time |
| % | Club played in tier 6 at the time |
| ^ | Club played in tier 7 at the time |

=== Results ===
| Season | Winner | Score | Runners–up | Venue | Attendance |
|---|---|---|---|---|---|
| 1969–70 | Macclesfield Town | 2–0 | Telford United | Wembley Stadium (original) | 28,000 |
| 1970–71 | Telford United | 3–2 | Hillingdon Borough | Wembley Stadium (original) | 29,500 |
| 1971–72 | Stafford Rangers | 3–0 | Barnet | Wembley Stadium (original) | 24,000 |
| 1972–73 | Scarborough | 2–1 * | Wigan Athletic | Wembley Stadium (original) | 23,000 |
| 1973–74 | Morecambe | 2–1 | Dartford | Wembley Stadium (original) | 19,000 |
| 1974–75 | Matlock Town | 4–0 | Scarborough | Wembley Stadium (original) | 21,000 |
| 1975–76 | Scarborough | 3–2 * | Stafford Rangers | Wembley Stadium (original) | 21,000 |
| 1976–77 | Scarborough | 2–1 | Dagenham | Wembley Stadium (original) | 21,500 |
| 1977–78 | Altrincham | 3–1 | Leatherhead | Wembley Stadium (original) | 20,000 |
| 1978–79 | Stafford Rangers | 2–0 | Kettering Town | Wembley Stadium (original) | 32,000 |
| 1979–80 | Dagenham % | 2–1 | Mossley | Wembley Stadium (original) | 26,000 |
| 1980–81 | Bishop's Stortford % | 1–0 | Sutton United | Wembley Stadium (original) | 22,578 |
| 1981–82 | Enfield | 1–0 * | Altrincham | Wembley Stadium (original) | 18,678 |
| 1982–83 | Telford United | 2–1 | Northwich Victoria | Wembley Stadium (original) | 22,071 |
| 1983–84 | Northwich Victoria | 1–1 * | Bangor City | Wembley Stadium (original) | 14,200 |
| 1983–84 (R) | Northwich Victoria | 2–1 | Bangor City | Victoria Ground | 5,805 |
| 1984–85 | Wealdstone | 2–1 | Boston United | Wembley Stadium (original) | 20,775 |
| 1985–86 | Altrincham | 1–0 | Runcorn | Wembley Stadium (original) | 15,700 |
| 1986–87 | Kidderminster Harriers | 0–0 * | Burton Albion | Wembley Stadium (original) | 23,617 |
| 1986–87 (R) | Kidderminster Harriers | 2–1 | Burton Albion | The Hawthorns | 15,685 |
| 1987–88 | Enfield | 0–0 * | Telford United | Wembley Stadium (original) | 21,328 |
| 1987–88 (R) | Enfield | 3–2 | Telford United | The Hawthorns | 7,005 |
| 1988–89 | Telford United | 1–0 * | Macclesfield Town | Wembley Stadium (original) | 19,576 |
| 1989–90 | Barrow | 3–0 | Leek Town % | Wembley Stadium (original) | 21,492 |
| 1990–91 | Wycombe Wanderers | 2–1 | Kidderminster Harriers | Wembley Stadium (original) | 34,842 |
| 1991–92 | Colchester United | 3–1 | Witton Albion | Wembley Stadium (original) | 32,254 |
| 1992–93 | Wycombe Wanderers | 4–1 | Runcorn | Wembley Stadium (original) | 32,968 |
| 1993–94 | Woking | 2–1 | Runcorn | Wembley Stadium (original) | 15,818 |
| 1994–95 | Woking | 2–1 * | Kidderminster Harriers | Wembley Stadium (original) | 17,815 |
| 1995–96 | Macclesfield Town | 3–1 | Northwich Victoria | Wembley Stadium (original) | 8,672 |
| 1996–97 | Woking | 1–0 * | Dagenham & Redbridge | Wembley Stadium (original) | 24,376 |
| 1997–98 | Cheltenham Town | 1–0 | Southport | Wembley Stadium (original) | 26,837 |
| 1998–99 | Kingstonian | 1–0 | Forest Green Rovers | Wembley Stadium (original) | 20,037 |
| 1999–2000 | Kingstonian | 3–2 | Kettering Town | Wembley Stadium (original) | 20,034 |
| 2000–01 | Canvey Island % | 1–0 | Forest Green Rovers | Villa Park | 10,007 |
| 2001–02 | Yeovil Town | 2–0 | Stevenage Borough | Villa Park | 18,809 |
| 2002–03 | Burscough % | 2–1 | Tamworth | Villa Park | 14,625 |
| 2003–04 | Hednesford Town % | 3–2 | Canvey Island | Villa Park | 6,635 |
| 2004–05 | Grays Athletic % | 1–1 † | Hucknall Town % | Villa Park | 8,116 |
| 2005–06 | Grays Athletic | 2–0 | Woking | Boleyn Ground | 13,997 |
| 2006–07 | Stevenage Borough | 3–2 | Kidderminster Harriers | Wembley Stadium (new) | 53,262 |
| 2007–08 | Ebbsfleet United | 1–0 | Torquay United | Wembley Stadium (new) | 40,186 |
| 2008–09 | Stevenage Borough | 2–0 | York City | Wembley Stadium (new) | 27,110 |
| 2009–10 | Barrow | 2–1 * | Stevenage Borough | Wembley Stadium (new) | 21,223 |
| 2010–11 | Darlington | 1–0 * | Mansfield Town | Wembley Stadium (new) | 24,668 |
| 2011–12 | York City | 2–0 | Newport County | Wembley Stadium (new) | 19,844 |
| 2012–13 | Wrexham | 1–1 † | Grimsby Town | Wembley Stadium (new) | 35,266 |
| 2013–14 | Cambridge United | 4–0 | Gosport Borough % | Wembley Stadium (new) | 18,120 |
| 2014–15 | North Ferriby United % | 3–3 † | Wrexham | Wembley Stadium (new) | 14,585 |
| 2015–16 | FC Halifax Town | 1–0 | Grimsby Town | Wembley Stadium (new) | 46,781 |
| 2016–17 | York City | 3–2 | Macclesfield Town | Wembley Stadium (new) | 38,224 |
| 2017–18 | Brackley Town % | 1–1 † | Bromley | Wembley Stadium (new) | 31,430 |
| 2018–19 | AFC Fylde | 1–0 | Leyton Orient | Wembley Stadium (new) | 42,962 |
| 2019–20 | Harrogate Town | 1–0 | Concord Rangers % | Wembley Stadium (new) | N/A (BCD) |
| 2020–21 | Hornchurch ^ | 3–1 | Hereford | Wembley Stadium (new) | 6,000 |
| 2021–22 | Bromley | 1–0 | Wrexham | Wembley Stadium (new) | 46,111 |
| 2022–23 | FC Halifax Town | 1–0 | Gateshead | Wembley Stadium (new) | 27,374 |
| 2023–24 | Gateshead | 2–2 † | Solihull Moors | Wembley Stadium (new) | 19,964 |
| 2024–25 | Aldershot Town | 3–0 | Spennymoor Town % | Wembley Stadium (new) | 38,600 |
| 2025–26 | Southend United | 0–0 † | Wealdstone | Wembley Stadium (new) | 43,306 |

== Results by team ==
Teams shown in italics are no longer in existence. Teams shown in bold compete in the Premier League or the English Football League as of 2024 and therefore do not enter the FA Trophy. Additionally, Bangor City switched to the Welsh football league system in 1992, making the club ineligible to compete in the competition from then onwards.

| Club | Wins | Last final won | Runners-up | Last final lost |
|---|---|---|---|---|
| Telford United | 3 | 1989 | 2 | 1988 |
| Woking | 3 | 1997 | 1 | 2006 |
| Scarborough | 3 | 1977 | 1 | 1975 |
| **Stevenage Borough** | 2 | 2009 | 2 | 2010 |
| Macclesfield Town | 2 | 1996 | 2 | 2017 |
| York City | 2 | 2017 | 1 | 2009 |
| Altrincham | 2 | 1986 | 1 | 1982 |
| Stafford Rangers | 2 | 1979 | 1 | 1976 |
| **Barrow** | 2 | 2010 | 0 | – |
| Grays Athletic | 2 | 2006 | 0 | – |
| Kingstonian | 2 | 2000 | 0 | – |
| **Wycombe Wanderers** | 2 | 1993 | 0 | – |
| Enfield | 2 | 1988 | 0 | – |
| FC Halifax Town | 2 | 2023 | 0 | – |
| Kidderminster Harriers | 1 | 1987 | 3 | 2007 |
| **Wrexham** | 1 | 2013 | 2 | 2022 |
| Northwich Victoria | 1 | 1984 | 2 | 1996 |
| Wealdstone | 1 | 1985 | 1 | 2026 |
| Gateshead | 1 | 2024 | 1 | 2023 |
| **Bromley** | 1 | 2022 | 1 | 2018 |
| Canvey Island | 1 | 2001 | 1 | 2004 |
| Dagenham | 1 | 1980 | 1 | 1977 |
| Southend United | 1 | 2026 | 0 | – |
| Aldershot Town | 1 | 2025 | 0 | – |
| Hornchurch | 1 | 2021 | 0 | – |
| **Harrogate Town** | 1 | 2020 | 0 | – |
| AFC Fylde | 1 | 2019 | 0 | – |
| Brackley Town | 1 | 2018 | 0 | – |
| North Ferriby United | 1 | 2015 | 0 | – |
| **Cambridge United** | 1 | 2014 | 0 | – |
| Darlington | 1 | 2011 | 0 | – |
| Ebbsfleet United | 1 | 2008 | 0 | – |
| Hednesford Town | 1 | 2004 | 0 | – |
| Burscough | 1 | 2003 | 0 | – |
| Yeovil Town | 1 | 2002 | 0 | – |
| **Cheltenham Town** | 1 | 1998 | 0 | – |
| **Colchester United** | 1 | 1992 | 0 | – |
| Bishop's Stortford | 1 | 1981 | 0 | – |
| Matlock Town | 1 | 1975 | 0 | – |
| **Morecambe** | 1 | 1974 | 0 | – |
| Runcorn | 0 | – | 3 | 1994 |
| **Grimsby Town** | 0 | – | 2 | 2016 |
| Forest Green Rovers | 0 | – | 2 | 2001 |
| Kettering Town | 0 | – | 2 | 2000 |
| Spennymoor Town | 0 | – | 1 | 2025 |
| Soilhull Moors | 0 | – | 1 | 2024 |
| Hereford | 0 | – | 1 | 2021 |
| Concord Rangers | 0 | – | 1 | 2020 |
| **Leyton Orient** | 0 | – | 1 | 2019 |
| Gosport Borough | 0 | – | 1 | 2014 |
| **Newport County** | 0 | – | 1 | 2012 |
| **Mansfield Town** | 0 | – | 1 | 2011 |
| Torquay United | 0 | – | 1 | 2008 |
| Hucknall Town | 0 | – | 1 | 2005 |
| Tamworth | 0 | – | 1 | 2003 |
| Southport | 0 | – | 1 | 1998 |
| Dagenham & Redbridge | 0 | – | 1 | 1997 |
| Witton Albion | 0 | – | 1 | 1992 |
| Leek Town | 0 | – | 1 | 1990 |
| **Burton Albion** | 0 | – | 1 | 1987 |
| Boston United | 0 | – | 1 | 1985 |
| Bangor City | 0 | – | 1 | 1984 |
| Sutton United | 0 | – | 1 | 1981 |
| Mossley | 0 | – | 1 | 1980 |
| Leatherhead | 0 | – | 1 | 1978 |
| Dartford | 0 | – | 1 | 1974 |
| **Wigan Athletic** | 0 | – | 1 | 1973 |
| Barnet | 0 | – | 1 | 1972 |
| Hillingdon Borough | 0 | – | 1 | 1971 |
