= Football in London =

As of the 2026–27 season, there are seventeen teams playing in professional leagues in London: six play in the Premier League, eight in the Football League, three in the National League. Wembley Stadium is also marked.

Association football is the most popular sport, both in terms of participants and spectators, in London. London has several of England's leading men's football clubs. The city is the home of sixteen men's professional clubs, several dozen men's semi-professional clubs and several hundred men's amateur clubs regulated by the London Football Association, Middlesex County Football Association, Surrey County Football Association, Amateur Football Alliance and the Kent County Football Association. Most London clubs are named after the district in which they play (or used to play), and share rivalries with each other.

London football teams have won a total of 22 English first division titles, 42 FA Cups, 12 EFL Cups, 29 Community Shields (Note: The 1991 FA Charity Shield was shared between Arsenal and Tottenham Hotspur.), 16 English second division titles, 2 Club World Cups, 2 Champions Leagues, 5 Cup Winners' Cups, 5 UEFA Cups/Europa Leagues, 3 Conference Leagues, 1 Inter-Cities Fairs Cup, 2 Super Cups, and 2 Intertoto Cups. In the 1989–90 season, eight of London's professional clubs were in the top tier of English football at the same time, meaning that 40% of the member clubs of the First Division that season were based in one city.

== Introduction ==
Fulham was founded in 1879. The club is London's oldest football club still playing professionally. Royal Arsenal was London's first club to turn professional in 1891. The club became Woolwich Arsenal in 1893 and then became Arsenal Football Club in 1913. Arsenal are only the second English club (after Preston North End of 1888–89), and the only London club to go an entire League season unbeaten, in the 2003–04 season. Arsenal have won The FA Cup a record 14 times; they were the first London team to win the Football League First Division in the 1930–31 season and the first London club to win the Premier League in the 1997–98 season. They were also the first London club to reach the European Cup/UEFA Champions League final, which they did in the 2005–06 season, though losing 1–2 to Barcelona.

Chelsea is the only club from London to win the UEFA Champions League, securing the title in both 2012 and 2021. On 15 May 2013, Chelsea won the UEFA Europa League to become the fourth club and the first British side to win all three main UEFA club competitions. In 2025, Chelsea became the first club to have won all four UEFA main club competitions; the European Cup/UEFA Champions League, the European/UEFA Cup Winners' Cup, the UEFA Cup/UEFA Europa League, and the UEFA Europa Conference League/UEFA Conference League.

Chelsea is also the only London club to have participated in and win the FIFA Club World Cup in 2021 and 2025. Previously, they were runners-up in 2012, losing to Corinthians.

Tottenham Hotspur were the first British club to win a European trophy, winning the Cup Winners Cup in 1963. Arsenal, Chelsea and Tottenham Hotspur are traditionally London's most successful teams. Between them, they have won a total of 104 titles and trophies. Wembley Stadium (1923), England's national stadium, was in London. The site of the 1966 FIFA World Cup final and numerous European cup finals, it was the home venue of the England national football team and had traditionally hosted the FA Cup final since 1923. Wembley closed in 2000 and its replacement opened in 2007.

== History ==
The playing of team ball games (almost certainly including football) was first recorded in London by William FitzStephen around 1174–1183. He described the activities of London youths during the annual festival of Shrove Tuesday.

"After lunch all of the city's youth would go out into the fields to take part in a ball game. The students of each school have their own ball; the workers from each city craft are also carrying their balls. Older citizens, fathers, and the wealthy would come on horseback to watch their juniors competing, and to relive their own youth vicariously: you can see their inner passions aroused as they watch the action and get caught up in the fun being had by the carefree adolescents."

Regular references to the game occurred throughout the fourteenth and fifteenth centuries, including the first reference to the word "football" in English when it was outlawed by King Henry IV of England in 1409. Early games were probably disorganised and violent. In the sixteenth century, the headmaster of St Paul's School Richard Mulcaster is credited with taking mob football and transforming it into organised and refereed team football. In 1581 he wrote about his game of football, which included smaller teams, referees, set positions and even a coach.

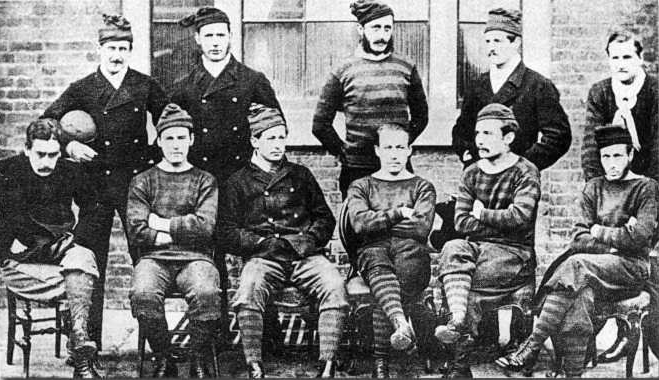
Royal Engineers A.F.C., 1872.

The modern game of football was first codified in 1863 in London and subsequently spread worldwide. Key to the establishment of the modern game was Londoner Ebenezer Cobb Morley who was a founding member of the Football Association, the oldest football organisation in the world. Morley wrote to the Bell's Life newspaper proposing a governing body for football which led directly to the first meeting at the Freemasons' Tavern in central London of the FA. He wrote the first set of rules of true modern football at his house in Barnes. The modern passing form of the game was invented in London in the early 1870s by the Royal Engineers A.F.C. (albeit the club were based in Chatham, Kent).

Prior to the first meeting of the Football Association in the Freemasons' Tavern in Great Queen Street, London on 26 October 1863, there were no universally accepted rules for the playing of the game of football. The founder members present at the first meeting were Barnes, Civil Service, Crusaders, Forest of Leytonstone (later to become Wanderers), N.N. (No Names) Club (Kilburn), the original Crystal Palace, Blackheath, Kensington School, Percival House (Blackheath), Surbiton and Blackheath Proprietary School; Charterhouse sent its captain, B.F. Hartshorne, but declined the offer to join. All of the 12 founding clubs were from London though many are since defunct or now play rugby union.

A rise in the popularity of football in London dates from the end of the 19th century, when a fall in church attendance left many people searching for a way to spend their weekend leisure time. In 1882 the London Football Association was set up. Over the next 25 years clubs sprang up all over the capital, and the majority of these teams are still thriving in the 21st century. Of those clubs currently playing in the Football League, Fulham is generally considered to be London's oldest, having been founded in 1879. However, Isthmian League side Cray Wanderers is the oldest extant club in all of the Greater London area, having been founded in 1860 in St Mary Cray | (then part of Kent but now in the London Borough of Bromley) and are still affiliated to the Kent County Football Association.

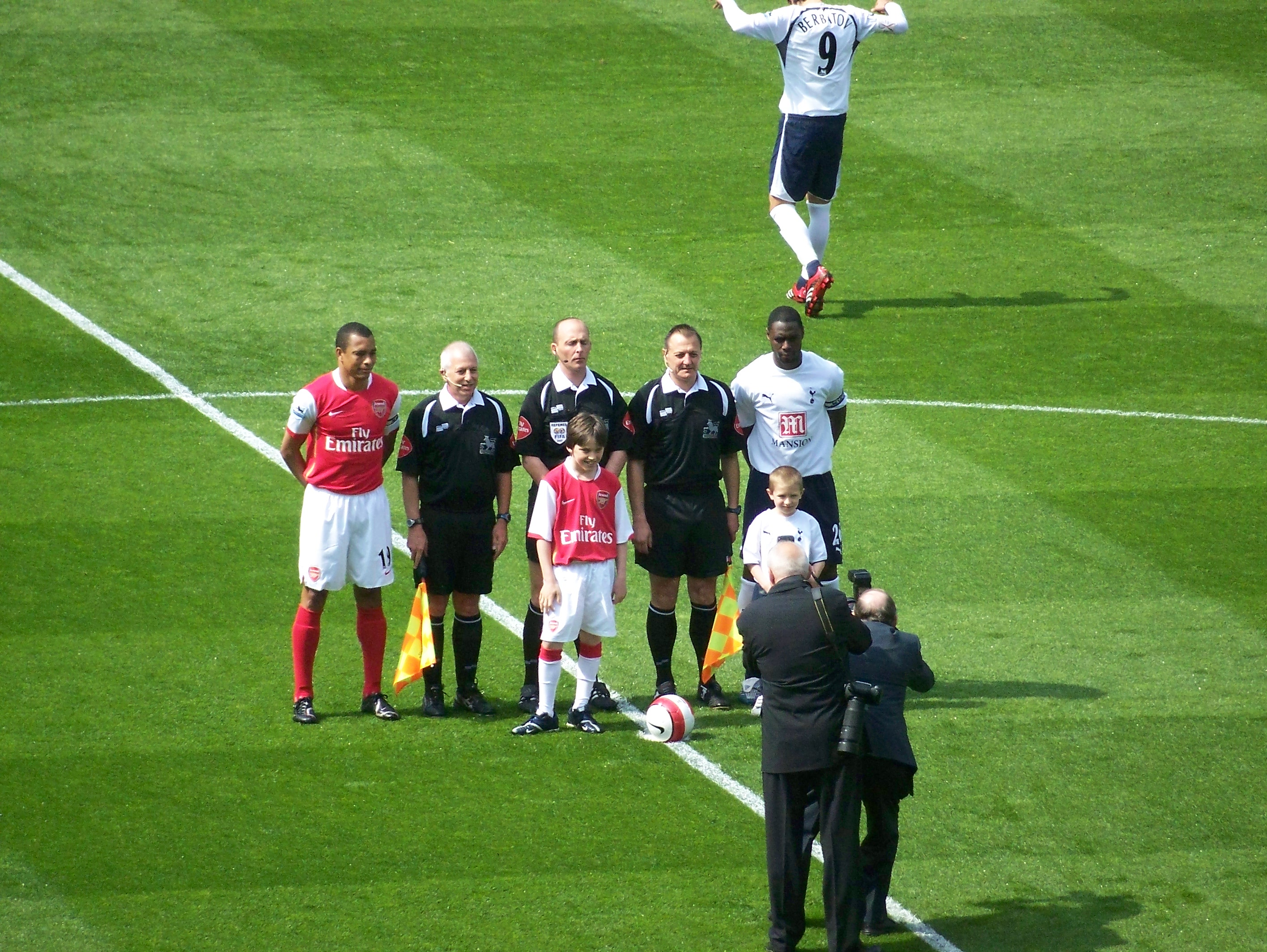
Just before a North London derby between Spurs and Arsenal in 2007.

Initially, football in London was dominated by amateur teams, drawing their membership from former public schoolboys but gradually working-class sides came to the forefront. Royal Arsenal was London's first professional team, becoming so in 1891, a move which saw them boycotted by the amateur London Football Association. Other London clubs soon followed Arsenal's footsteps in turning professional, including Millwall (1893), Tottenham Hotspur (1895), Fulham (1898) and West Ham (1898).

In the meantime, Woolwich Arsenal (formerly Royal Arsenal) went on to be the first London club to join the Football League, in 1893. The following year, the Southern League was founded and many of its members would go on to join the Football League. In 1901 Tottenham Hotspur became the first club from London to win the FA Cup in the professional era, although it would not be until 1931 that a London side would win the Football League, the team in question being Arsenal (having moved to Highbury in 1913 and dropping the "Woolwich" from their name).

In the 1989–90 season, eight of London's professional clubs were in the top tier of English Football at the same time, forming 40% of the First Division that season.

There were eight London clubs in First Division in the 1989–90 season

Arsenal, Chelsea, and Tottenham are regarded as three of the Premier League's current "big six" alongside Liverpool, Manchester United, and Manchester City. In the two seasons immediately proceeding the start of this top six run, Arsenal and Chelsea became the first pair of London clubs to finish first and second in the top flight, with Arsenal winning in 2003–04, and Chelsea winning in 2004–05. The 2009–10 season saw Chelsea (1st), Arsenal (3rd) and Tottenham (4th) all finish in the top four, qualifying all three of these London teams into the same UEFA Champions League competition.

Before the 1996–97 season, when Chelsea started its run of consistent high finishes, the two highest profile London clubs were Arsenal and their long-standing North London rivals Tottenham Hotspur, both of whom were considered to be members of English football's "big five" (with Manchester United, Liverpool and Everton) for much of the post-war period.

== Clubs ==
The table below lists all London clubs in the top eight tiers of the English football league system: from the top division (the Premier League), down to Step 4 of the National League System. League status is correct for the 2026–27 season.

Club	Location	Borough	Stadium	Capacity	Founded	Notes
Level 1 – Premier League (6)
Arsenal	Holloway	Islington	Emirates Stadium	60,704	1886	First London club to turn professional in 1891. London's most successful football club, having won 50 major trophies. First London club to become English League Champions, in 1931. Record FA Cup winners with 14 titles. Won the league unbeaten in the 2003–04 season, becoming only the second team to do so after Preston North End.
Brentford	Brentford	Hounslow	Brentford Community Stadium	17,250	1889	Founded as Brentford Rowing Club. Played at Griffin Park from 1904 to 2020 before moving grounds.
Chelsea	Fulham	Hammersmith and Fulham	Stamford Bridge	40,044	1905	The only club to have won all four UEFA main club competitions, the European Cup/UEFA Champions League, the European/UEFA Cup Winners' Cup, the UEFA Cup/UEFA Europa League and the UEFA Conference League. The first and only club to win all three pre-1999 main UEFA club competitions more than once each. The only London club to win the Champions League, Super Cup and the Club World Cup.
Crystal Palace	Selhurst	Croydon	Selhurst Park	25,194	1905	A Crystal Palace team established in 1861 were FA founder members. Won the FA Cup, their first major trophy, on 17 May 2025. Won the UEFA Conference League in 2025–26 for their first European trophy.
Fulham	Fulham	Hammersmith and Fulham	Craven Cottage	28,800	1879	London's first professional club in the Football League.
Tottenham Hotspur	Tottenham	Haringey	Tottenham Hotspur Stadium	62,850	1882	The only non-league team to win the FA Cup (in 1901) after the founding of the Football League. The first London club (as well as the first English club) to win a European trophy, the UEFA Cup Winners' Cup in 1963. Also, inaugural winner of the UEFA Cup/Europa League in 1972.
Level 2 – EFL Championship (4)
Charlton Athletic	Charlton	Greenwich	The Valley	27,111	1905	Won FA Cup in 1947. Have ground-shared at Selhurst Park and the Boleyn Ground.
Millwall	Bermondsey	Southwark	The Den	20,146	1885	Founded in East London on the Isle of Dogs, moved south across the river to Bermondsey in 1910.
Queens Park Rangers	Shepherd's Bush	Hammersmith and Fulham	Loftus Road	18,439	1882	The team was renamed Queens Park Rangers in 1886 after the merger of St Jude's (formed in 1884) and Christchurch Rangers (formed 1882). They won the League Cup in 1967, from the third division.
West Ham United	Stratford	Newham	London Stadium	62,500	1895	Founded as Thames Ironworks. Played at the Boleyn Ground from 1904 to 2016, before moving to Stratford. The first English club to win the UEFA Conference League.
Level 3 – EFL League One (3)
AFC Wimbledon	Wimbledon	Merton	Plough Lane	9,300	2002	Formed by fans of Wimbledon in protest after the club announced relocation to Milton Keynes. Starting at the ninth level of the football pyramid, they won promotion to the Football League in 2011.
Bromley	Bromley	Bromley	Hayes Lane	5,150	1892	Won the FA Trophy in 2022.
Leyton Orient	Leyton	Waltham Forest	Brisbane Road	9,271	1881	Leyton Orient was originally formed by members of the Glyn Cricket Club.
Level 4 – EFL League Two (1)
Barnet	Edgware	Harrow	The Hive Stadium	5,100	1888	First London team to be promoted from the Football Conference into the Football League, in 1991.
Level 5 – National League (3)
Hornchurch	Upminster	Havering	Hornchurch Stadium	3,500	2005	Founded as successors to Hornchurch F.C. Renamed from AFC Hornchurch to Hornchurch FC in 2019.
Sutton United	Sutton	Sutton	Gander Green Lane	5,013	1898	The 2021–22 season was Sutton's first season in the Football League.
Wealdstone	Ruislip	Hillingdon	Grosvenor Vale	4,085	1899	First ever non-League team to achieve the double of FA Trophy and Football Conference title in the same season, in 1985.
Level 6 – National League South (2)
Dagenham & Redbridge	Dagenham	Barking and Dagenham	Victoria Road	6,078	1992	Formed through a merger of Dagenham (formed in 1949) and Redbridge Forest (1979).
Hampton & Richmond Borough	Hampton	Richmond upon Thames	Beveree Stadium	3,500	1921	Known as Hampton FC until 1999.
Level 7 – Isthmian League Premier Division (8)
Carshalton Athletic	Carshalton	Sutton	War Memorial Sports Ground	5,000	1905	
Cheshunt	Cheshunt	Broxbourne	Theobalds Lane	3,000	1946	
Cray Valley Paper Mills	Eltham	Greenwich	Badgers Sports Ground	1,000	1919	
Cray Wanderers	Chislehurst	Bromley	Flamingo Park	3,252	1860	
Dulwich Hamlet	East Dulwich	Southwark	Champion Hill	3,000	1893	
Enfield Town	Enfield	Enfield	Queen Elizabeth II Stadium	2,500	2001	Founded by supporters of Enfield protest against the club owners' actions.
Welling United	Welling	Bexley	Park View Road	3,500	1963	Took over the ground that used to be played on by defunct club Bexley United.
Wingate & Finchley	Finchley	Barnet	The Maurice Rebak Stadium	1,500	1991	Formed after Finchley and Wingate merged.
Level 7 – Southern Football League Premier Division South (2)
Hanwell Town	Perivale	Ealing	Reynolds Field	3,000	1920	
Uxbridge	Yiewsley	Hillingdon	Honeycroft	3,770	1871	
Level 8 – Isthmian League Division One North (2)
Redbridge	Barkingside	Redbridge	Oakside Stadium	3,000	1959	
Walthamstow	Walthamstow	Waltham Forest	Wadham Lodge	3,500	1868	
Level 8 – Isthmian League Division One South Central (9)
Bedfont Sports	Bedfont	Hounslow	Bedfont Recreation Ground	3,000	2002	
Hanworth Villa	Hanworth	Hounslow	Rectory Meadow	1,000	1976	
Harrow Borough	Harrow	Harrow	Earlsmead Stadium	3,070	1933	
Hayes & Yeading United	Hayes	Hillingdon	SkyEx Community Stadium	2,500	2007	Formed through a merger of Hayes and Yeading.
Hendon	Kingsbury	Brent	Silver Jubilee Park	1,990	1908	
Kingstonian	Raynes Park	Kingston upon Thames	Prince George's Playing Fields	1,500	1885	Won the F.A. Trophy in 1999 and 2000. Currently groundsharing with Raynes Park Vale.
Metropolitan Police	East Molesey	Elmbridge (Surrey)	Imber Court	3,000	1919	Founded by officers and staff of the Metropolitan Police.
Raynes Park Vale	Raynes Park	Merton	Prince George's Playing Fields	1,500	1995	
Southall	Southall	Ealing	The 1878 Stadium	2,500	1871	Groundsharing at Burnham.
Level 8 – Isthmian League Division One South East (3)
AFC Croydon Athletic	Thornton Heath	Croydon	Mayfield Stadium	3,000	2012	Founded as successors to Croydon Athletic F.C. in 2012.
Beckenham Town	Beckenham	Bromley	Eden Park Avenue	4,000	1971	
Erith Town	Thamesmead	Bexley and Greenwich	Bayliss Avenue	6,000	1959	Groundsharing at Sporting Club Thamesmead.
Level 8 – Southern Football League Division One Central (4)
Enfield	Hertford	East Hertfordshire	Hertingfordbury Park	2,500	2007	Groundsharing at Hertford Town.
Hadley	Arkley	Barnet	Brickfield Lane	2,000	1882	
Northwood	Northwood	Hillingdon	Skyline Roofing Stadium	3,076	1926	
Rayners Lane	Rayners Lane	Harrow	Tithe Farm Social Club	1,000	1933	

Below the eighth tier, numerous London clubs are represented within the Combined Counties League (SW), Essex Senior League (NE), Southern Counties East Football League (SE) and the Spartan South Midlands League (NW).

=== Defunct clubs ===
Club	Location	Borough	Stadium	Founded	Dissolved/ Merged	Notes
Casuals	?	?	?	1878	1939	Founder members of the Isthmian League in 1905 and won the FA Amateur Cup in 1936. Merged with Corinthian to form Corinthian-Casuals.
Clapham Rovers	Clapham	Lambeth	Clapham Common	1869	1911	Former FA Cup winners. Scorers of the first ever FA Cup goal.
Corinthian	?	?	Queen's Club, Crystal Palace, Leyton	1882	1939	Rarely partook in competitive matches yet defeated many strong teams, often by a wide margin – e.g. FA Cup holders Blackburn Rovers 8–1 (1884) and Bury FC 10-3 (1903). Merged with Casuals to form Corinthian-Casuals.
Croydon Athletic	Thornton Heath	Croydon	KT Stadium	1986	2011/2012	Supporters of the defunct club and some of the old club management and officials formed a new member owned, fan owned, club — AFC Croydon Athletic.
Croydon Common	Selhurst	Croydon	Croydon Common Athletic Ground	1897	1917	The only Southern League Division One club not to return to playing football after World War I.
Croydon Municipal	Croydon	Croydon	Croydon Arena	2009	2010	Offshoot of Croydon FC. Withdrew from the league at the conclusion of their first season.
Ealing	Ealing	Ealing	Various in West London, including Wembley Stadium	1905	2013	Founding Member of the Ishmian League. Southern Amateur League and Amateur Cup double in 1927. Folded due to demise of long term team officials and increased costs. First amateur team to play at Wembley. Played 8 home games there in 1928.
Edgware Town	Edgware	Barnet	White Lion Ground (Now at Silver Jubilee Park, Kingsbury)	1939	2008 (Reformed 2014)	At the end of the 2007–08 season, Edgware Town were forced to resign from the Isthmian League Division One North when lack of funds meant that the club were unable to confirm a new ground for the following season after their lease at the White Lion ground had expired.
Fisher Athletic	East Dulwich	Southwark	Champion Hill	1908	2009	Once tenants of Dulwich Hamlet. A new fan-owned club, Fisher F.C., was formed.
Hayes	Hayes	Hillingdon	Church Road	1909	2007	Merged with Yeading to form Hayes & Yeading United.
Leyton	Leyton	Waltham Forest	Leyton Stadium	1868	2011	In January 2011, after a short suspension from the league for not paying its subscription, the club was forced to withdraw from the Isthmian League Division One North division due to debt.
London XI	Multiple	Multiple	Multiple	1955	1958	Created specifically to take part in the Inter-Cities Fairs Cup between 1955 and 1958, reaching the final.
Nunhead	Nunhead	Southwark	Brown's Ground (also known as 'Nunhead Sports Ground')	1888	1949, with day-to-day operations ceasing at the end of the 1940–41 season	Founded as Wingfield House Football Club in 1888, the name was changed to Nunhead F.C. in 1904.
Thames	Custom House	Newham	West Ham Stadium	1928	1932	Members of the Football League between 1930 and 1932.
Upton Park	Upton Park	Newham (originally Essex, when founded)	West Ham Park	1866	1911	Represented Great Britain at the 1900 Summer Olympics football tournament, winning the gold medal.
Wanderers	Leytonstone (originally)	Waltham Forest	The Oval and others	1859	c. 1887	Winners of the first ever FA Cup.
Wimbledon	Wimbledon	Merton	Plough Lane, Selhurst Park	1889	2004	Moved to Milton Keynes in 2003, renamed Milton Keynes Dons in 2004. AFC Wimbledon formed in 2002 by the majority of its former fans.
Yeading	Yeading	Hillingdon	The Warren	1960	2007	Merged with Hayes to form Hayes & Yeading United.

There are also a huge number of minor London clubs playing outside the top eight levels of English football. Hackney Marshes in east London, home to many amateur sides, is reportedly the single largest collection of football pitches in the world, with 100 separate pitches.

=== Popularity ===
Many association football clubs from London are also successful on social media with a large international fanbase. Three of the top 20 most popular sports clubs on Instagram in the world, as of 23 November 2023, are from London:

Rank	Sports club	Sport	Country	Followers
1	Real Madrid	Association football	Spain	149 million
2	Barcelona	Association football	Spain	124 million
3	Paris Saint-Germain	Association football	France	65.7 million
4	Manchester United	Association football	United Kingdom	63.1 million
5	Juventus	Association football	Italy	59.8 million
6	Manchester City	Association football	United Kingdom	49.4 million
7	Liverpool	Association football	United Kingdom	43.6 million
8	Chelsea	Association football	United Kingdom	41.4 million
9	Bayern Munich	Association football	Germany	40.8 million
10	Golden State Warriors	Basketball	United States	32.1 million
11	Arsenal	Association football	United Kingdom	28.2 million
12	Los Angeles Lakers	Basketball	United States	23.6 million
13	Borussia Dortmund	Association football	Germany	19.3 million
14	Cleveland Cavaliers	Basketball	United States	16.5 million
15	Tottenham Hotspur	Association football	United Kingdom	16.5 million
16	Atlético Madrid	Association football	Spain	16.3 million
17	Inter Miami	Association football	United States	15.4 million
18	Milan	Association football	Italy	15.3 million
19	Galatasaray	Association football	Turkey	14.4 million
20	Mumbai Indians	Cricket	India	13 million

== Most successful clubs overall (1871–present) ==
Team	English Football Champions	FA Cup	EFL Cup	FA Community Shield	Championship	Domestic Total	European Cup / Champions League	UEFA Cup Winners' Cup	UEFA Cup / Europa League	UEFA Conference League	UEFA Super Cup	UEFA Intertoto Cup	Fairs Cup*	Intercontinental Cup / FIFA Club World Cup	European / Worldwide Total	Total
Arsenal	14	**14**	2	18	–	48	–	1	–	–	–	–	**1**	–	2	50
Chelsea	6	8	5	4	2	25	2	**2**	2	**1**	2	–	–	**2**	11	36
Tottenham Hotspur	2	8	4	7	2	23	–	1	**3**	–	–	–	–	–	4	27
West Ham United	–	3	–	1	2	6	–	1	–	**1**	–	1	–	–	3	9
Wanderers	–	5	–	–	–	5	–	–	–	–	–	–	–	–	–	5
Crystal Palace	–	1	–	1	2	4	–	–	–	**1**	–	–	–	–	1	5
Fulham	–	–	–	–	3	3	–	–	–	–	–	1	–	–	1	4
Queens Park Rangers	–	–	1	–	2	3	–	–	–	–	–	–	–	–	–	3
Charlton Athletic	–	1	–	–	1	2	–	–	–	–	–	–	–	–	–	2
Clapham Rovers	–	1	–	–	–	1	–	–	–	–	–	–	–	–	–	1
Wimbledon	–	1	–	–	–	1	–	–	–	–	–	–	–	–	–	1
Brentford	–	–	–	–	1	1	–	–	–	–	–	–	–	–	–	1
Millwall	–	–	–	–	1	1	–	–	–	–	–	–	–	–	–	1

The figures in bold represent the most times this competition has been won by an English team.
Shared Community Shield results listed as wins.
* Note that the Inter-Cities Fairs Cup was not organized by UEFA, and is therefore not officially considered a UEFA competition.

== Most supported clubs by Londoners ==
=== 2024 YouGov poll ===
Percentage of fans polled who live in London (YouGov, 2024)
Club	%	Sample
Arsenal	33%	3,020
Aston Villa	8%	933
Bournemouth	13%	277
Brentford	53%	215
Brighton & Hove Albion	5%	546
Burnley	1%	219
Chelsea	38%	1,629
Crystal Palace	41%	421
Everton	6%	666
Fulham	49%	194
Liverpool	11%	2,936
Luton Town	3%	177
Manchester City	18%	1,290
Manchester United	13%	3,879
Newcastle United	2%	1,554
Nottingham Forest	2%	555
Sheffield United	2%	298
Tottenham Hotspur	22%	1,836
West Ham United	23%	1,078
Wolverhampton Wanderers	4%	502

== Domestic honours ==
=== English football champions ===
- Titles (clubs): 22 (3)
- Runners-up (clubs): 23 (5)

Club	Winners	Runners-up	Winning years
Arsenal	14	12	1930–31, 1932–33, 1933–34, 1934–35, 1937–38, 1947–48, 1952–53, 1970–71, 1988–89, 1990–91, 1997–98, 2001–02, 2003–04, 2025–26
Chelsea	6	4	1954–55, 2004–05, 2005–06, 2009–10, 2014–15, 2016–17
Tottenham Hotspur	2	5	1950–51, 1960–61
Queens Park Rangers	–	1	
Charlton Athletic	–	1	

Outside of those five, the highest league positions of London clubs which have played in the top-flight are 3rd (Crystal Palace, West Ham United), 5th (Brentford), 6th (Wimbledon), 7th (Fulham), 10th (Millwall), and 22nd (Leyton Orient).

=== FA Cup ===
There have been seven all-London FA Cup finals the first being in 1967 between Tottenham Hotspur and Chelsea. Arsenal have won three all-London affairs, Spurs and West Ham both two. Chelsea have featured in four (a joint record with Arsenal) losing all four.

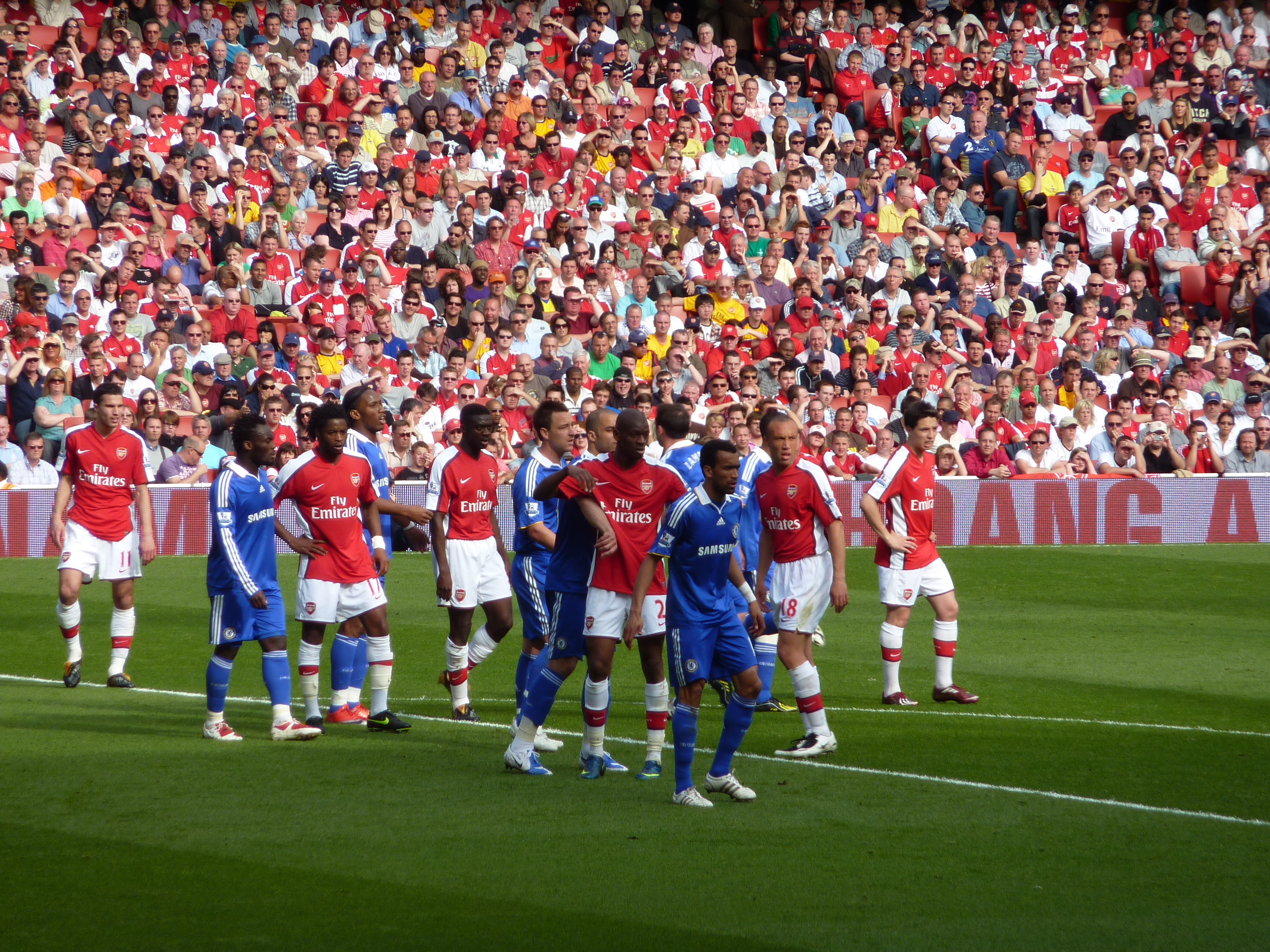
Arsenal playing Chelsea - two of London's most successful FA Cup teams.

FA Cup finals between London clubs
Final No.	Season	Winners	Score	Runners–up	Venue	Attendance
86th	1966–67	Tottenham Hotspur	2–1	Chelsea	Wembley Stadium (original)	100,000
94th	1974–75	West Ham United	2–0	Fulham	Wembley Stadium (original)	100,000
99th	1979–80	West Ham United	1–0	Arsenal	Wembley Stadium (original)	100,000
101st	1981–82	Tottenham Hotspur	1–1; 1–0 (Replay)	Queens Park Rangers	Wembley Stadium (original)	100,000 , 90,000 (Replay)
121st	2001–02	Arsenal	2–0	Chelsea	Millennium Stadium	73,963
136th	2016–17	Arsenal	2–1	Chelsea	Wembley Stadium (new)	89,472
139th	2019–20	Arsenal	2–1	Chelsea	Wembley Stadium (new)	0^{[B]}

- Titles (clubs): 42 (9)
- Runners-up (clubs): 26 (10)

Team	Winners	Runners-up	Years won	Years runner-up
Arsenal	14	7	1930, 1936, 1950, 1971, 1979, 1993, 1998, 2002, 2003, 2005, 2014, 2015, 2017, 2020	1927, 1932, 1952, 1972, 1978, 1980, 2001
Chelsea	8	9	1970, 1997, 2000, 2007, 2009, 2010, 2012, 2018	1915, 1967, 1994, 2002, 2017, 2020, 2021, 2022, 2026
Tottenham Hotspur	8	1	1901, 1921, 1961, 1962, 1967, 1981, 1982, 1991	1987
Wanderers	5	0	1872, 1873, 1876, 1877, 1878	—
West Ham United	3	2	1964, 1975, 1980	1923, 2006
Crystal Palace	1	2	2025	1990, 2016
Charlton Athletic	1	1	1947	1946
Clapham Rovers	1	1	1880	1879
Wimbledon	1	0	1988	—
Fulham	0	1	—	1975
Queens Park Rangers	0	1	—	1982
Millwall	0	1	—	2004

=== EFL Cup ===
EFL Cup finals between London clubs
Final No.	Season	Winners	Score	Runners–up	Venue	Attendance
47th	2006–07	Chelsea	2–1	Arsenal	Millennium Stadium	70,073
48th	2007–08	Tottenham Hotspur	2–1 (a.e.t.)	Chelsea	Wembley Stadium (new)	87,660
55th	2014–15	Chelsea	2–0	Tottenham Hotspur	Wembley Stadium (new)	89,294

- Titles (clubs): 12 (4)
- Runners-up (clubs): 20 (5)

Team	Winners	Runners-up	Years won	Years runner-up
Chelsea	5	5	1965, 1998, 2005, 2007, 2015	1972, 2008, 2019, 2022, 2024
Tottenham Hotspur	4	5	1971, 1973, 1999, 2008	1982, 2002, 2009, 2015, 2021
Arsenal	2	7	1987, 1993	1968, 1969, 1988, 2007, 2011, 2018, 2026
Queens Park Rangers	1	1	1967	1986
West Ham United	0	2	—	1966, 1981

=== FA Community Shield ===
Community Shields between London clubs
Final No.	Season	Winners	Score	Runners–up	Venue	Attendance
69th	1991	Arsenal; Tottenham Hotspur	0–0		Wembley Stadium (original)	65,483
83rd	2005	Chelsea	2–1	Arsenal	Millennium Stadium	58,014
93rd	2015	Arsenal	1–0	Chelsea	Wembley Stadium (new)	85,437
95th	2017	Arsenal	1–1 (4–1 p)	Chelsea	Wembley Stadium (new)	83,325

- Titles (clubs): 30 (Note: The 1991 FA Charity Shield was shared between Arsenal and Tottenham Hotspur.) (5)
- Runners-up (clubs): 24 (7)

Team	Winners	Runners-up	Years won (* denotes shared)	Years runner-up
Arsenal	17	7	1930, 1931, 1933, 1934, 1938, 1948, 1953, 1991*, 1998, 1999, 2002, 2004, 2014, 2015, 2017, 2020, 2023	1935, 1936, 1979, 1989, 1993, 2003, 2005
Tottenham Hotspur	7	2	1921, 1951, 1961, 1962, 1967*, 1981*, 1991*	1920, 1982
Chelsea	4	9	1955, 2000, 2005, 2009	1970, 1997, 2006, 2007, 2010, 2012, 2015, 2017, 2018
West Ham United	1	2	1964*	1975, 1980
Crystal Palace	1	0	2025	
Queens Park Rangers	0	2		1908, 1912
Corinthian	0	1		1927
Wimbledon	0	1		1988

=== Second Division / Championship (Tier 2) ===
- Titles (clubs): 16 (9)
- Runners-up (clubs): 18 (9)

Club	Winners	Runners-up	Winning years
Fulham	3	1	1948–49, 2000–01, 2021–22
Chelsea	2	5	1983–84, 1988–89
West Ham United	2	3	1957–58, 1980–81
Tottenham Hotspur	2	2	1919–20, 1949–50
Queens Park Rangers	2	2	1982–83, 2010–11
Crystal Palace	2	1	1978–79, 1993–94
Charlton Athletic	1	2	1999–2000
Brentford	1	–	1934–35
Millwall	1	–	1987–88
Arsenal	–	1	
Leyton Orient	–	1	

== London football in Europe ==
- Titles (clubs): 14 (6)
- Runners-up (clubs): 9 (6)

=== UEFA Champions League ===
- Titles (clubs): 2 (1)
- Runners-up (clubs): 4 (3)

Team	Winners	Runners-up	Years won	Years runner-up
Chelsea	2	1	2012, 2021	2008
Arsenal	0	2	–	2006, 2026
Tottenham Hotspur	0	1	–	2019

=== UEFA Cup Winners' Cup ===
- Titles (clubs): 5 (4)
- Runners-up (clubs): 3 (2)

Team	Winners	Runners-up	Years won	Years runner-up
Chelsea	2	0	1971, 1998	–
Arsenal	1	2	1994	1980, 1995
West Ham United	1	1	1965	1976
Tottenham Hotspur	1	0	1963	–

=== UEFA Cup and UEFA Europa League ===
- Titles (clubs): 5 (2)
- Runners-up (clubs): 4 (3)

UEFA Europa League finals between London clubs
Final No.	Season	Winners	Score	Runners–up	Venue	Attendance
48th	2018–19	Chelsea	4–1	Arsenal	Baku Olympic Stadium	51,370

Team	Winners	Runners-up	Years won	Years runner-up
Tottenham Hotspur	3	1	1972, 1984, 2025	1974
Chelsea	2	0	2013, 2019	–
Arsenal	0	2	–	2000, 2019
Fulham	0	1	–	2010

=== UEFA Conference League ===
- Titles (clubs): 3 (3)
- Runners-up (clubs): 0 (0)

Team	Winners	Runners-up	Years won	Years runner-up
West Ham United	1	0	2023	–
Chelsea	1	0	2025	–
Crystal Palace	1	0	2026	–

=== Inter-Cities Fairs Cup ===
- Titles (clubs): 1 (1)
- Runners-up (clubs): 1 (1)

Team	Winners	Runners-up	Years won	Years runner-up
Arsenal	1	0	1970	–
London XI	0	1	–	1958

=== UEFA Super Cup ===
- Titles (clubs): 2 (1)
- Runners-up (clubs): 5 (3)

Team	Winners	Runners-up	Years won	Years runner-up
Chelsea	2	3	1998, 2021	2012, 2013, 2019
Arsenal	0	1	–	1994
Tottenham Hotspur	0	1	–	2025

=== UEFA Intertoto Cup ===
- Titles (clubs): 2 (2)

Team	Winners	Runners-up	Years won
West Ham United	1	0	1999
Fulham	1	0	2002

== London football in FIFA Club World Cup ==
- Titles (clubs): 2 (1)
- Runners-up (clubs): 1 (1)

Team	Winners	Runners-up	Years won	Years runner-up
Chelsea	2	1	2021, 2025	2012

== Stadium ==
=== Wembley Stadium ===
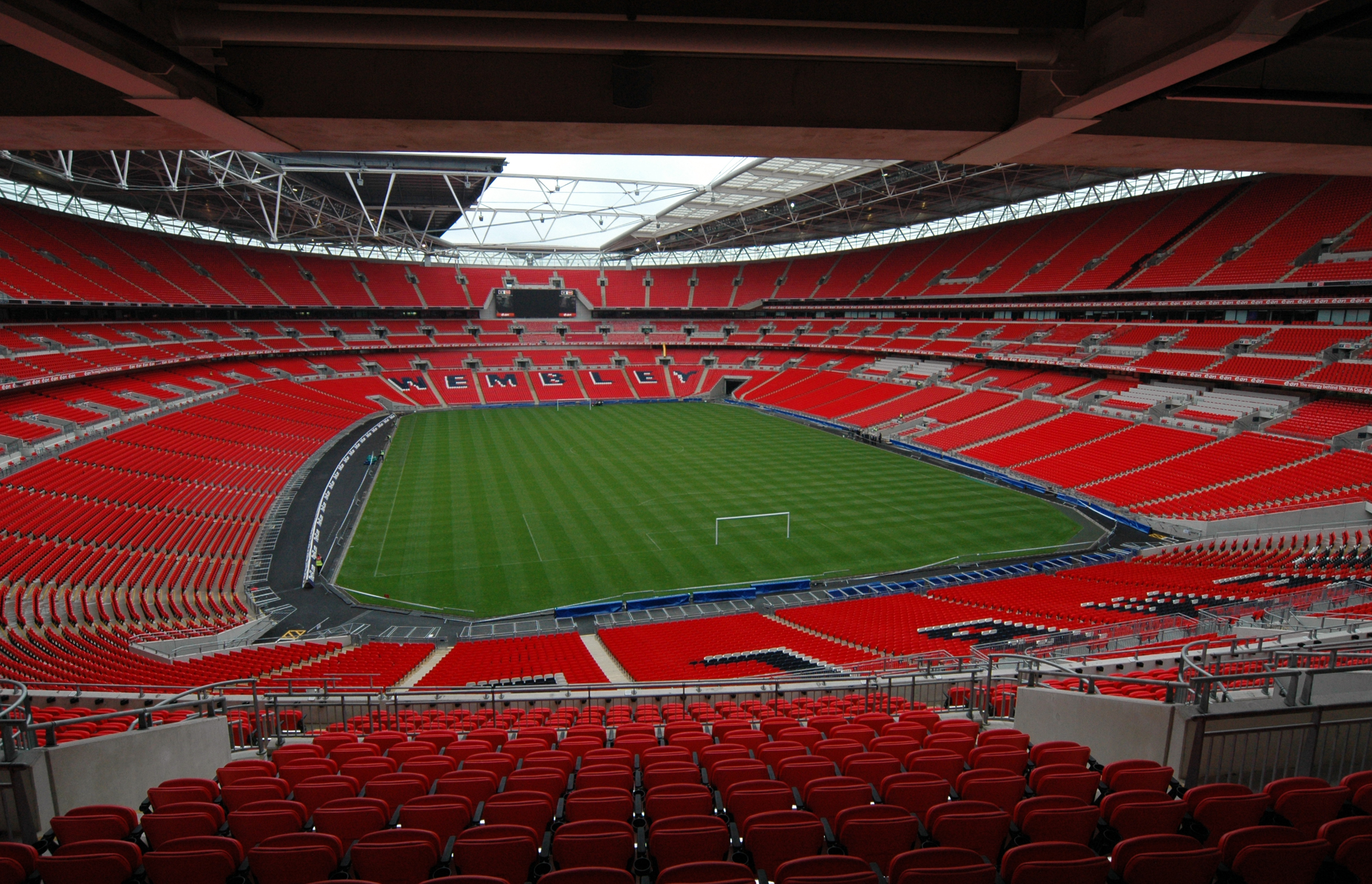
The Wembley Stadium in London, England.

Wembley Stadium, in north-west London, is the national football stadium, and is traditionally the home of the FA Cup Final as well as England's home internationals. The original stadium of the same name was closed in 2000 in order to be demolished and completely rebuilt, and reopened in 2007; during the closure Cardiff's Millennium Stadium was the venue for cup finals, while England played at various venues around the country. Wembley was one of the venues for the 1966 FIFA World Cup, as well as UEFA Euro 1996 and 2020, hosting the final of all three tournaments. It also was the venue for the European Cup final in 1968, 1978, 1992, 2011 and 2013. With a 90,000-capacity, it is the second largest stadium in Europe.

=== Other stadiums ===
Most clubs in London have their own stadium, although some clubs share, and some clubs may temporarily take up a tenancy at another's ground due to their own ground being redeveloped. The largest operational football stadium in London apart from Wembley is Tottenham Hotspur Stadium, with a capacity of 62,850. Other large stadiums include West Ham United's London Stadium (62,500), Arsenal's Emirates Stadium (60,704) and Chelsea's Stamford Bridge (40,343). There are 10 stadiums in London (apart from Wembley) with capacities over 18,000.

== Attendances ==
The top 10 football clubs from London with the highest average home league attendance in the 2024–25 league season:

Rank	Club	Average
1	West Ham United	62,464
2	Tottenham Hotspur	61,127
3	Arsenal	60,251
4	Chelsea	39,611
5	Fulham	26,826
6	Crystal Palace	25,064
7	Queens Park Rangers	15,856
8	Millwall	15,490
9	Charlton Athletic	15,255
10	AFC Wimbledon	8,008
Average per club		32,983

== Administration ==
London is the location of the headquarters of the Football Association, at Wembley Stadium (formerly Soho Square and Lancaster Gate), while the Premier League's offices are located in Marylebone. The Football League maintains its headquarters in Preston, although its commercial offices are based in Marylebone as well.

== See also ==
- Sport in London
- Football in England
- List of football clubs in England by competitive honours won
