= 2009–10 Combined Counties Football League =

The 2009–10 Combined Counties Football League season was the 32nd in the history of the Combined Counties Football League, a football competition in England.

== Premier Division ==
Combined Counties Football League Premier Division
- Season: 2009–10
- Champions: North Greenford United
- Promoted: North Greenford United
- Matches: 462
- Goals: 1,540 (3.33 per match)

The Premier Division featured three new teams in a league of 22 teams after the promotion of Bedfont Green to the Southern Football League:

- Croydon, transferred from the Kent Football League
- Dorking, promoted from Division One
- Hanworth Villa, promoted from Division One

=== League table ===
Pos	Team	Pld	W	D	L	GF	GA	GD	Pts	Promotion or relegation
1	North Greenford United	42	30	8	4	108	42	+66	98	Promoted to the Southern League Division One Central
2	Chertsey Town	42	28	8	6	97	51	+46	92	
3	Camberley Town	42	25	9	8	83	47	+36	84	
4	Egham Town	42	24	5	13	97	62	+35	77	
5	Epsom & Ewell	42	22	5	15	81	58	+23	71	
6	Chessington & Hook United	42	20	11	11	64	50	+14	71	
7	Guildford City	42	21	7	14	70	52	+18	70	
8	Molesey	42	20	9	13	69	53	+16	68 (Note: Molesey were deducted one point.)	
9	Sandhurst Town	42	20	8	14	80	67	+13	68	
10	Badshot Lea	42	18	11	13	93	75	+18	65	
11	Ash United	42	19	5	18	76	75	+1	62	
12	Cove	42	16	11	15	72	71	+1	59	
13	Bedfont	42	16	10	16	80	71	+9	58	Club folded
14	Horley Town	42	13	14	15	62	70	−8	53	
15	Wembley	42	13	7	22	58	70	−12	46	
16	Croydon	42	9	15	18	55	81	−26	42	
17	Hanworth Villa	42	10	9	23	50	74	−24	39	
18	Raynes Park Vale	42	10	9	23	57	85	−28	39	
19	Colliers Wood United	42	10	8	24	51	79	−28	38	
20	Banstead Athletic	42	8	11	23	50	87	−37	35	
21	Bookham	42	9	5	28	45	99	−54	32	
22	Dorking	42	3	11	28	42	121	−79	20	

Source: fchd.
Rules for classification: 1) points; 2) goal difference; 3) number of goals scored.

== Division One ==
Combined Counties Football League Division One
- Season: 2009–10
- Champions: Mole Valley SCR
- Promoted: Mole Valley SCR
- Matches: 420
- Goals: 1,577 (3.75 per match)

Division One featured five new teams in a league of 21 teams:

- Bedfont Sports, joining from the Middlesex County League
- Cobham, relegated from the Premier Division
- Croydon Municipal, new club formed as a reserve team for Croydon
- Eversley, joining from the Surrey Elite Intermediate League
- Hartley Wintney, relegated from the Premier Division

=== League table ===
Pos	Team	Pld	W	D	L	GF	GA	GD	Pts	Promotion or relegation
1	Mole Valley SCR	40	28	7	5	113	44	+69	91	Promoted to the Premier Division
2	Worcester Park	40	26	10	4	103	35	+68	88	
3	Knaphill	40	26	4	10	98	52	+46	82	
4	Staines Lammas	40	25	6	9	99	46	+53	81	
5	Hartley Wintney	40	22	7	11	95	59	+36	73	
6	South Park	40	22	6	12	89	69	+20	72	
7	Cobham	40	21	8	11	94	56	+38	71	
8	Eversley	40	19	11	10	81	55	+26	68	
9	Bedfont Sports	40	20	8	12	71	48	+23	68	
10	Farleigh Rovers	40	21	3	16	66	57	+9	66	
11	Farnham Town	40	20	4	16	88	67	+21	61 (Note: Farnham Town were deducted three points.)	
12	Warlingham	40	16	7	17	69	76	−7	55	
13	Frimley Green	40	13	8	19	61	71	−10	47	
14	Croydon Municipal	40	14	5	21	79	97	−18	47	Resigned from the league
15	CB Hounslow United	40	11	10	19	58	89	−31	43	
16	Westfield	40	12	4	24	70	92	−22	40	
17	Sheerwater	40	11	4	25	52	100	−48	37	
18	Crescent Rovers	40	7	11	22	60	108	−48	32	Resigned to the Surrey Elite Intermediate League
19	Chobham	40	9	4	27	54	104	−50	31	
20	Feltham	40	7	7	26	50	107	−57	27 (Note: Feltham were deducted one point.)	
21	Coulsdon United	40	1	4	35	27	145	−118	7	Resigned to the Surrey Elite Intermediate League

Source: fchd.
Rules for classification: 1) points; 2) goal difference; 3) number of goals scored.
