= 1999 FA Trophy final =

- Event: 1998–99 FA Trophy
Forest Green Rovers	Kingstonian
0	1
- Date: 15 May 1999
- Venue: Wembley Stadium, London

The 1999 FA Trophy final was an association football match played on 15 May 1999 at Wembley Stadium, London. The match was the 30th final of the FA Trophy, the domestic cup competition played primarily by semi-professional teams in the English football league system. The final was contested between Conference National members Forest Green Rovers and Kingstonian. Both clubs were competing in their first FA Trophy final.

Both sides were given byes to the second round of the competition, and they progressed through six rounds in total to reach the final. Neither team required a replay in their run to the final. In the two-legged semi-finals, Forest Green and Kingstonian each drew in their respective first leg matches before winning in the second leg.

In the final Tarkan Mustafa scored an early second half goal which was enough to see Kingstonian win 1–0 and claim the FA Trophy. Kingstonian manager Geoff Chapple won the trophy for the fourth time, having previously won it with Woking in the 1994, 1995 and 1997 finals. Kingstonian, still managed by Chapple, would go on to retain their trophy by winning the 2000 FA Trophy final.
