= 2008–09 Kent Football League =

The 2008–09 Kent Football League season (known as the Bulmers Cider Kent League reflecting the sponsorship by Bulmers) was the 43rd in the history of Kent Football League a football competition in England.

The League structure comprised three divisions: a Premier Division, and Divisions One and Two. The latter two were known as the Reserves Section, which included reserves teams not permitted in the Premier Division. Additionally, there were two league cup competitions, the Challenge Cup for the Premier Division clubs, and another for the teams in the two divisions of the Reserves Section.

== Premier Division ==
Kent Football League Premier Division
- Season: 2008–09
- Champions: VCD Athletic
- Promoted: VCD Athletic
- Matches: 272
- Goals: 965 (3.55 per match)

The division featured 17 clubs, 16 of which competed in the previous season together with one additional club:

- Norton Sports, joined from the Kent County League

At the end of the season three clubs left the division:

- VCD Athletic, promoted to the Isthmian League Division One North
- Croydon, transferred to the Combined Counties League
- Slade Green, resigned as the club folded

=== League table ===
| Pos | Team | Pld | W | D | L | GF | GA | GD | Pts | Season end notes |
|---|---|---|---|---|---|---|---|---|---|---|
| 1 | VCD Athletic | 32 | 22 | 4 | 6 | 68 | 24 | +44 | 70 | Promoted to the Isthmian League Division One North |
| 2 | Hythe Town | 32 | 21 | 4 | 7 | 71 | 39 | +32 | 67 | |
| 3 | Greenwich Borough (Note: Greenwich Borough v Erith Town match abandoned at 3–3; match win awarded to Erith Town (W, D, L and Pts columns adjusted).) | 32 | 20 | 3 | 9 | 60 | 45 | +15 | 63 | |
| 4 | Faversham Town | 32 | 20 | 2 | 10 | 83 | 40 | +43 | 62 | |
| 5 | Holmesdale | 32 | 18 | 7 | 7 | 57 | 30 | +27 | 61 | |
| 6 | Herne Bay | 32 | 19 | 3 | 10 | 68 | 50 | +18 | 60 | |
| 7 | Erith Town | 32 | 15 | 9 | 8 | 59 | 39 | +20 | 54 | |
| 8 | Erith & Belvedere | 32 | 16 | 5 | 11 | 67 | 50 | +17 | 53 | |
| 9 | Croydon | 32 | 15 | 4 | 13 | 58 | 40 | +18 | 49 | Transferred to the Combined Counties League |
| 10 | Tunbridge Wells | 32 | 13 | 6 | 13 | 53 | 50 | +3 | 45 | |
| 11 | Norton Sports | 32 | 12 | 4 | 16 | 44 | 57 | −13 | 40 | |
| 12 | Deal Town | 32 | 10 | 8 | 14 | 57 | 53 | +4 | 38 | |
| 13 | Slade Green | 32 | 11 | 4 | 17 | 53 | 66 | −13 | 37 | Resigned: club folded |
| 14 | Sevenoaks Town | 32 | 9 | 4 | 19 | 44 | 67 | −23 | 31 | |
| 15 | Beckenham Town | 32 | 8 | 4 | 20 | 54 | 76 | −22 | 28 | |
| 16 | Lordswood | 32 | 6 | 3 | 23 | 43 | 79 | −36 | 21 | |
| 17 | Sporting Bengal United | 32 | 0 | 0 | 32 | 26 | 160 | −134 | 0 | |

Source: Kent League (archived)
Rules for classification: 1) points; 2) goal difference; 3) number of goals scored.

=== Results ===
| Home \ Away | BEC | CRO | DEA | E&B | ERI | FAV | GRE | HER | HOL | HYT | LOR | NOR | SEV | SLA | SPB | TUN | VCD |
|---|---|---|---|---|---|---|---|---|---|---|---|---|---|---|---|---|---|
| Beckenham Town | | 2–0 | 1–1 | 2–3 | 2–3 | 2–7 | 0–2 | 1–2 | 2–0 | 1–3 | 0–1 | 4–1 | 3–2 | 4–3 | 4–3 | 2–2 | 2–4 |
| Croydon | 2–1 | | 3–1 | 2–0 | 1–3 | 2–1 | 0–1 | 1–2 | 0–3 | 1–2 | 5–2 | 2–0 | 3–0 | 4–1 | 8–0 | 0–1 | 0–0 |
| Deal Town | 1–1 | 2–4 | | 0–1 | 0–0 | 0–3 | 1–2 | 2–1 | 0–4 | 1–0 | 3–3 | 4–0 | 3–0 | 2–1 | 4–0 | 1–3 | 1–1 |
| Erith & Belvedere | 3–2 | 3–2 | 1–5 | | 2–3 | 2–1 | 1–1 | 1–2 | 0–2 | 0–2 | 1–0 | 0–0 | 2–1 | 0–3 | 10–2 | 0–0 | 0–1 |
| Erith Town | 2–1 | 0–0 | 1–1 | 1–3 | | 0–1 | 1–2 | 1–3 | 0–1 | 4–1 | 2–0 | 0–0 | 2–1 | 0–2 | 6–0 | 0–0 | 3–1 |
| Faversham Town | 5–1 | 4–1 | 4–0 | 3–2 | 1–1 | | 1–3 | 2–1 | 0–1 | 1–3 | 5–1 | 1–0 | 1–2 | 5–2 | 10–0 | 2–1 | 0–2 |
| Greenwich Borough | 3–2 | 0–2 | 2–1 | 2–0 | 3–3 (Note: Match abandoned, win awarded to Erith Town) | 1–2 | | 1–0 | 1–3 | 1–1 | 2–3 | 0–1 | 2–1 | 3–2 | 4–0 | 2–1 | 0–4 |
| Herne Bay | 3–0 | 3–2 | 1–1 | 3–2 | 2–5 | 1–5 | 1–2 | | 0–0 | 2–3 | 4–0 | 4–0 | 2–0 | 2–1 | 6–2 | 4–1 | 1–1 |
| Holmesdale | 3–2 | 1–1 | 3–2 | 0–2 | 1–1 | 0–1 | 1–1 | 4–0 | | 3–1 | 1–0 | 3–2 | 2–1 | 2–2 | 6–0 | 3–3 | 0–1 |
| Hythe Town | 1–0 | 1–0 | 2–1 | 1–1 | 1–1 | 1–4 | 0–2 | 5–1 | 1–1 | | 7–2 | 4–1 | 3–1 | 3–0 | 5–0 | 2–0 | 0–2 |
| Lordswood | 2–0 | 1–4 | 2–3 | 1–1 | 1–2 | 1–2 | 1–3 | 0–2 | 1–0 | 0–1 | | 0–1 | 0–1 | 2–4 | 4–2 | 1–2 | 1–2 |
| Norton Sports | 2–1 | 1–0 | 1–4 | 3–4 | 0–1 | 2–1 | 3–5 | 0–1 | 2–1 | 1–4 | 4–3 | | 2–2 | 1–2 | 5–0 | 3–1 | 1–2 |
| Sevenoaks Town | 2–2 | 0–1 | 3–2 | 1–3 | 3–3 | 1–5 | 4–2 | 1–3 | 0–1 | 3–2 | 5–1 | 0–2 | | 1–1 | 2–1 | 1–2 | 0–5 |
| Slade Green | 1–3 | 1–0 | 2–1 | 0–4 | 1–0 | 1–1 | 2–3 | 3–1 | 0–3 | 2–5 | 1–1 | 0–1 | 1–2 | | 5–0 | 1–3 | 0–2 |
| Sporting Bengal United | 1–5 | 1–3 | 0–7 | 1–9 | 0–7 | 1–3 | 2–3 | 1–3 | 2–3 | 1–3 | 1–5 | 1–3 | 0–2 | 2–5 | | 1–5 | 1–2 |
| Tunbridge Wells | 3–1 | 1–3 | 2–2 | 2–4 | 1–2 | 3–1 | 0–1 | 0–4 | 1–0 | 1–2 | 4–1 | 1–1 | 2–1 | 1–2 | 4–0 | | 1–0 |
| VCD Athletic | 5–0 | 1–1 | 1–0 | 1–2 | 3–1 | 1–0 | 1–0 | 2–3 | 0–1 | 0–1 | 4–2 | 1–0 | 3–0 | 4–1 | 9–0 | 2–1 | |

Source: Kent League (archived)
Legend: Blue = home team win; Yellow = draw; Red = away team win.

=== Challenge Cup ===
The 2008–09 Kent Football League Challenge Cup, known as the Bulmers Cider Kent League Cup (reflecting the sponsorship by Bulmers), was won by Croydon.

The competition was contested by the 17 teams from the Premier Division over a total of five rounds: four on an aggregate basis (home and away matches) followed by a final match played on a neutral ground (at Welling United F.C. this season).

==== Quarter-finals, Semi-finals and Final ====
Quarter-finals
Croydon | 0 | 2 | 2
Herne Bay | 0 | 1 | 1
Faversham Town | 3 | 0 | 3
Holmesdale | 2 | 0 | 2
Hythe Town | 2 | 4 | 6
Slade Green | 1 | 0 | 1
Tunbridge Wells | 3 | 0 | 3
Erith Town | 3 | 2 | 5

Semi-finals
Croydon | 4 | 2 | 6
Faversham Town | 0 | 0 | 0
Hythe Town | 3 | 1 | 4
Erith Town | 1 | 4 | 5

Final
Croydon (Note: Croydon won 3-1 after penalties) | 1 | 3p
Erith Town | 1 | 1p

==== Second Round ====
- Hythe Town 14 – 3 Sporting Bengal United (1st Leg 10–1; 2nd Leg 4–2)
- Lordswood 0 – 6 Erith Town (1st Leg 0–3; 2nd Leg 0–3)
- Croydon 4 – 2 Sevenoaks Town (1st Leg 2–0; 2nd Leg 2–2)
- Slade Green 6 – 4 Greenwich Borough (1st Leg 1–2; 2nd Leg 5–2)
- Herne Bay 5 – 0 Norton Sports (1st Leg 1–0; 2nd Leg 4–0)
- Faversham Town 4 – 1 Beckenham Town (1st Leg 1–0; 2nd Leg 3–1)
- Holmesdale 2 – 1 Deal Town (1st Leg 2–0; 2nd Leg 0–1)
- Tunbridge Wells 3 – 2 VCD Athletic (1st Leg 1–1; 2nd Leg 2–1)

==== First Round ====
- Erith & Belvedere 6 – 8 Tunbridge Wells (1st Leg 2–2; 2nd Leg 4–6(aet))

Byes for the remaining 15 teams

Source: SCEFL Archives

== Reserves Section ==
The letter "R" following team names indicates a club’s reserves team.

The 2008–09 Reserves Section comprised two divisions, with promotion and relegation possible between the divisions. Promotion from the Reserves Section into the Premier Division was not permitted. There was a single League Cup competition for all teams in the section.

=== Division One ===
Kent Football League Division One
- Season: 2008–09
- Champions: Thamesmead Town R
- Matches: 132
- Goals: 405 (3.07 per match)

The division featured twelve clubs, ten of which competed in the previous season together with Dover Athletic R and Ashford Town (Kent) R who had both been promoted from Division Two.

At the end of the season Folkestone Invicta R and Sevenoaks Town R were relegated and Dover Athletic R left the league.

==== League table ====
| Pos | Team | Pld | W | D | L | GF | GA | GD | Pts | Season End Notes |
|---|---|---|---|---|---|---|---|---|---|---|
| 1 | Thamesmead Town R | 22 | 15 | 0 | 7 | 45 | 25 | +20 | 45 | |
| 2 | Cray Wanderers R | 22 | 13 | 1 | 8 | 46 | 27 | +19 | 40 | |
| 3 | Dartford R | 22 | 11 | 4 | 7 | 39 | 26 | +13 | 37 | |
| 4 | Maidstone United R | 22 | 11 | 3 | 8 | 32 | 22 | +10 | 36 | |
| 5 | Ashford Town (Kent) R | 22 | 11 | 3 | 8 | 36 | 27 | +9 | 36 | |
| 6 | Margate R | 22 | 10 | 4 | 8 | 34 | 35 | −1 | 34 | |
| 7 | Erith & Belvedere R | 22 | 10 | 3 | 9 | 30 | 24 | +6 | 33 | |
| 8 | Dover Athletic R | 22 | 10 | 2 | 10 | 46 | 45 | +1 | 32 | Resigned from the League |
| 9 | Whitstable Town R | 22 | 8 | 3 | 11 | 25 | 33 | −8 | 27 | |
| 10 | Chatham Town R | 22 | 7 | 5 | 10 | 36 | 43 | −7 | 26 | |
| 11 | Folkestone Invicta R | 22 | 5 | 2 | 15 | 16 | 47 | −31 | 17 | Relegated to Division Two |
| 12 | Sevenoaks Town R | 22 | 3 | 6 | 13 | 20 | 51 | −31 | 15 | Relegated to Division Two |

Source: Kent League: Table (archived) & Kent League: Results Grid (archived)
Rules for classification: 1) points; 2) goal difference; 3) number of goals scored.

==== Results ====
| Home \ Away | ASH | CHA | CRA | DAR | DOV | E&B | FOL | MAI | MAR | SEV | THA | WHI |
|---|---|---|---|---|---|---|---|---|---|---|---|---|
| Ashford Town (Kent) R | | 1–1 | 2–0 | 3–2 | 3–0 | 0–2 | 2–1 | 0–1 | 0–0 | 4–2 | 2–0 | 1–2 |
| Chatham Town R | 4–2 | | 2–5 | 1–3 | 2–2 | 0–2 | 6–0 | 1–5 | 0–2 | 2–1 | 2–4 | 2–2 |
| Cray Wanderers R | 0–3 | 4–1 | | 0–3 | 2–3 | 2–0 | 1–2 | 4–0 | 4–0 | 2–0 | 1–4 | 2–1 |
| Dartford R | 3–2 | 1–2 | 0–4 | | 2–1 | 2–0 | 2–0 | 1–1 | 1–1 | 4–1 | 3–0 | 0–1 |
| Dover Athletic R | 4–1 | 3–1 | 1–4 | 3–2 | | 4–3 | 3–0 | 0–1 | 4–3 | 4–2 | 0–2 | 3–1 |
| Erith & Belvedere R | 1–2 | 0–0 | 0–0 | 1–2 | 1–0 | | 2–0 | 0–1 | 3–1 | 0–1 | 3–0 | 2–0 |
| Folkestone Invicta R | 2–1 | 0–2 | 0–4 | 0–3 | 2–5 | 2–0 | | 1–0 | 0–2 | 2–2 | 0–3 | 1–2 |
| Maidstone United R | 0–2 | 0–0 | 0–1 | 1–1 | 4–1 | 2–4 | 2–0 | | 1–0 | 6–0 | 1–2 | 1–0 |
| Margate R | 2–1 | 3–2 | 1–0 | 1–0 | 4–2 | 1–1 | 2–1 | 0–2 | | 3–2 | 2–3 | 3–0 |
| Sevenoaks Town R | 0–3 | 0–2 | 0–3 | 0–0 | 1–1 | 1–2 | 0–0 | 2–1 | 2–2 | | 1–4 | 1–1 |
| Thamesmead Town R | 0–1 | 2–0 | 1–2 | 1–0 | 2–1 | 3–0 | 3–1 | 2–1 | 3–0 | 5–0 | | 1–2 |
| Whitstable Town R | 0–0 | 1–3 | 3–1 | 2–4 | 2–1 | 0–3 | 0–1 | 1–1 | 3–1 | 0–1 | 2–0 | |

Source: Kent League (archived)
Legend: Blue = home team win; Yellow = draw; Red = away team win.

=== Division Two ===
Kent Football League Division Two
- Season: 2008–09
- Champions: Holmesdale R
- Matches: 110
- Goals: 425 (3.86 per match)

The division featured eleven clubs, nine of which competed in the previous season together with two additional clubs:

- Ramsgate R, relegated from Division One
- Welling United R rejoining the Kent League for a single season after three years absence.

At the end of the season Herne Bay R and Holmedale R were promoted to Division One and Greenwich Borough R, Tunbridge Wells R and Welling United R left the league.

==== League table ====
| Pos | Team | Pld | W | D | L | GF | GA | GD | Pts | Season End Notes |
|---|---|---|---|---|---|---|---|---|---|---|
| 1 | Holmesdale R | 20 | 15 | 4 | 1 | 63 | 24 | +39 | 49 | Promoted to Division One |
| 2 | Herne Bay R | 20 | 12 | 4 | 4 | 44 | 31 | +13 | 40 | Promoted to Division One |
| 3 | Hythe Town R | 20 | 10 | 5 | 5 | 39 | 30 | +9 | 35 | |
| 4 | Faversham Town R | 20 | 10 | 5 | 5 | 41 | 33 | +8 | 35 | |
| 5 | Tunbridge Wells R | 20 | 10 | 3 | 7 | 45 | 44 | +1 | 33 | Resigned from the League |
| 6 | Welling United R (Note: VCD Athletic R v. Welling United R match: win awarded to VCD Athletic R) | 20 | 10 | 2 | 8 | 46 | 32 | +14 | 32 | Resigned from the League |
| 7 | Ramsgate R | 20 | 8 | 3 | 9 | 48 | 40 | +8 | 27 | |
| 8 | VCD Athletic R | 20 | 5 | 2 | 13 | 22 | 43 | −21 | 17 | |
| 9 | Deal Town R | 20 | 4 | 6 | 10 | 28 | 42 | −14 | 15 (Note: Deal Town R deducted three points.) | |
| 10 | Greenwich Borough R | 20 | 5 | 1 | 14 | 21 | 41 | −20 | 13 (Note: Greenwich Borough R deducted three points.) | Resigned from the League |
| 11 | Lordswood R | 20 | 2 | 3 | 15 | 28 | 65 | −37 | 9 | |

Source: Kent League (archived)
Rules for classification: 1) points; 2) goal difference; 3) number of goals scored.

==== Results ====
| Home \ Away | DEA | FAV | GRE | HER | HOL | HYT | LOR | RAM | TUN | VCD | WEL |
|---|---|---|---|---|---|---|---|---|---|---|---|
| Deal Town R | | 0–3 | – (Note: Match awarded to Deal Town R (0–0)) | 2–3 | 0–2 | 0–0 | 2–2 | 3–5 | 2–8 | 4–1 | 3–2 |
| Faversham Town R | 2–2 | | 3–1 | 2–2 | 1–4 | 3–1 | 2–0 | 2–2 | 4–2 | 2–1 | 0–3 |
| Greenwich Borough R | – (Note: Match awarded to Greenwich Borough R (0–0)) | 4–1 | | 1–2 | 2–4 | 2–3 | 1–0 | 1–0 | 0–1 | 1–1 | 0–3 |
| Herne Bay R | 1–1 | 1–0 | 5–0 | | 2–3 | 2–2 | 4–0 | 3–2 | 5–2 | 3–1 | 0–2 |
| Holmesdae R | 2–2 | 1–3 | 3–0 | 1–1 | | 1–1 | 3–0 | 6–3 | 1–1 | 2–0 | 7–0 |
| Hythe Town R | 2–1 | 2–2 | 3–1 | 1–2 | 1–4 | | 2–1 | 1–0 | 3–0 | 3–0 | 0–2 |
| Lordswood R | 3–1 | 2–5 | 5–1 | 1–2 | 3–6 | 2–5 | | 1–5 | 3–4 | 2–2 | 2–2 |
| Ramsgate R | 1–0 | 2–2 | 2–1 | 6–1 | 0–3 | 1–2 | 5–0 | | 5–1 | 4–1 | 3–4 |
| Tunbridge Wells R | 2–2 | 3–0 | 1–0 | 1–3 | 2–4 | 3–3 | 2–1 | 3–1 | | 3–1 | 2–0 |
| VCD Athletic R | 2–1 | 0–3 | 1–4 | 0–1 | 0–3 | 0–3 | 1–0 | 4–0 | 2–3 | | – (Note: Match awarded to VCD Athletic R (0–0)) |
| Welling United R | 1–2 | 0–1 | 3–1 | 3–1 | 2–3 | 3–1 | 10–0 | 1–1 | 4–1 | 1–4 | |

Source: Kent League (archived) & Kent League (archived), (Lordswood R 3–1 Deal R result)
Legend: Blue = home team win; Yellow = draw; Red = away team win.

=== Reserves Cup ===
The 2008–09 Kent Football League Reserves Cup, Known as the HAUC Reserves League Cup (reflecting the sponsorship by the Highways Agency and Utilities Committee), was won by Thamesmead Town R, who completed a League and Cup double.

The competition was contested by all 23 teams of the Reserves Section over a total of five rounds: the first three were single match knock-out rounds, followed by the semi-finals on an aggregate basis (home and away matches) and then the final match played on a neutral ground (at Folkestone Invicta F.C. this season)

==== Quarter-finals, Semi-finals and Final ====
Quarter-finals
Lordswood R | 0
Herne Bay R | 1
Folkestone Invicta R | 1
Whitstable Town R | 4
Dartford R | 1 (Note: After extra time)
Maidstone United R | 2
Thamesmead Town R | 2
Ashford Town (Kent) R | 1

Semi-finals
Herne Bay R | 1 | 0 | 1
Whitstable Town R | 4 | 1 | 5
Maidstone United R | 1 | 3 | 4
Thamesmead Town R | 2 | 4 | 6

Final
Whitstable Town R | 1
Thamesmead Town R | 4

==== Second Round ====
- Holmesdale R 2 – 3 Lordswood R
- Dover Athletic R 1 – 2 Folkestone Invicta R
- Welling United R 0 – 1 Ashford Town (Kent) R
- Erith & Belvedere R 0 – 2 Thamesmead Town R
- Sevenoaks Town R 0 – 2 Whitstable Town R
- Dartford R 3 – 1 Ramsgate R
- Margate R 1 – 3 Herne Bay R
- Cray Wanderers R 0 – 2 Maidstone United R

==== First Round ====
- Erith & Belvedere R 4 – 1 Deal Town R
- Herne Bay R 3 – 0 Chatham Town R
- Thamesmead Town R 2 – 1 VCD Athletic R
- Welling United R 3 – 0 Hythe Town R
- Holmesdale R 5 – 3 Faversham Town R
- Greenwich Borough R d – W Lordswood R (match score 2-0, Greenwich Borough R disqualified)
- Tunbridge Wells R 0 – 4 (aet) Dartford R

Byes for the remaining nine teams

Source: SCEFL Archives
