= 1889 Welsh Cup final =

1889 Football Association of Wales Challenge Cup final
- Event: 1888–89 Welsh Cup
Bangor	Northwich Victoria
2	1
- Date: 22 April 1889
- Venue: Racecourse Ground, Wrexham
- Referee: Mr Mitchell (Blackburn)
- Attendance: 4,000

The 1889 Welsh Cup final, the 12th in the competition, was contested by Bangor and Northwich Victoria at the Racecourse Ground. Bangor, in their first Welsh Cup final, won 2–1 in a match that would mark the first time these two teams, future founders and rivals of the Northern Premier League and Alliance Premier League would meet in a major final. The most recent was the 1984 FA Trophy Final.

== Route to the final ==
=== Bangor ===
Round	Opposition	Score	Venue
First Round	St. Asaph	0–7	St. Asaph (a)
Second Round	bye to the next round.		
Third Round	Ruthin	1–4	Ruthin (a)
Semi-final	Wrexham	2–3	Faulkner Street (n)

=== Northwich Victoria ===
Round	Opposition	Score	Venue
First Round	Over Wanderers	1–2	? (a)
Second Round	Chester St Oswalds	2–1	Drill Field (h)
Third Round	Davenham	0–0	Davenham (a)
Replay	Davenham	4–3	Drill Field (h)
Semi-final; 1st leg	Chirk AAA	1–1	Faulkner Street (n)
Replay	Chirk AAA	3–2	Faulkner Street (n)

== Match ==
22 April 1889
15:30

Bangor	2–1	Northwich Victoria
E P Whitley-Hughes 75'; R O Roberts	Report	R Leather 76'

Racecourse Ground, Wrexham
Attendance: 4,000
Referee: Mr Mitchell (Blackburn)

Bangor.	Northwich Victoria

== Notes ==
1. ^{nb1}
