= Steve Dunn (referee) =

English football referee (born 1957)

- Full name: Stephen W Dunn
- Born: 24 October 1957 (age 68); Bristol, England

Domestic
Years	League	Role
? – ?	Gloucs. County League	Referee
? – ?	Western League	Referee
? -1986	Football Conference	Referee
1986–1992	Football League	Linesman
1992–1995	Football League	Referee
1995–2006	Premier League	Referee

International
Years	League	Role
1992–1997	FIFA listed	Asst. referee
1997–2002	FIFA listed	Referee

Stephen W. Dunn (born 24 October 1957) is an English former FA Premier League football referee. He resides in his birthplace of Bristol, England with his wife.

== Career ==
Steve Dunn started refereeing local matches in 1978.

He progressed through the Gloucestershire County League, the Western League and the Football Conference to become a linesman in the Football League in 1986.

His appointment to the Football League list of referees came in 1992, and in the same year he became one of the first of the new FIFA assistant referees.

Dunn's first ever Premiership match was on 23 August 1995, when Tottenham Hotspur lost 1–0 at home to Aston Villa, the only goal coming from Ugo Ehiogu.

He reached the FIFA list of referees in 1997. Thus he became the first English official to achieve the "double" of the FIFA referees and FIFA assistants lists, a feat later matched by Steve Bennett, Graham Barber and Matt Messias. He completed six years at this level, stepping down at the age of 45 in 2002, although he continued refereeing as an over-age official in the domestic competitions until 2005.

In 2000, he was the man in the middle at the FA Trophy final between Kingstonian and Kettering Town.

One of his career highlights was the 2001 FA Cup Final between Arsenal and Liverpool, which the Gunners lost 2–1, their goal supplied by Freddie Ljungberg, but with two late goals coming from Michael Owen to reverse the scoreline at 90 minutes.

He would go on to referee Football League Cup semi-finals in 2002 and 2004.

Dunn's final Premier League game was Fulham's emphatic 6–0 win at home to relegated Norwich City on 15 May 2005.

He refereed his last professional match on 18 May 2005, when he took charge of West Ham United's 2–0 win against Ipswich Town in the Championship play-off semi-final second leg at Portman Road, both goals coming from Bobby Zamora. He was appointed to referee for the following season (2005–06) but made no appearances due to injury.

Preceded by Alan Wilkie	FA Trophy; 2000	Succeeded by Alan Wiley
Preceded by Graham Poll	FA Cup Final Referee; 2001	Succeeded by Mike Riley
