= Rockingham Road =

Former football stadium in Kettering, England

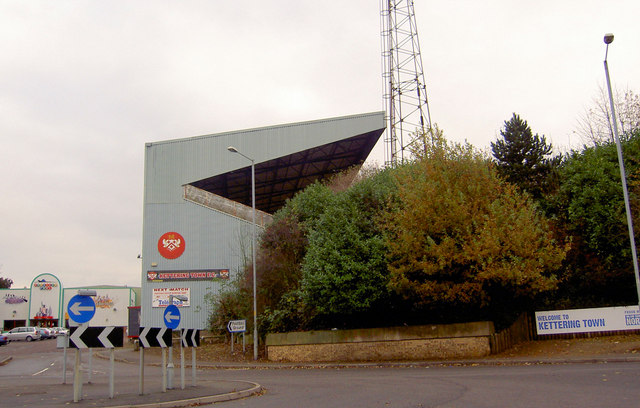
- Interactive map of Rockingham Road
- Location: Kettering, Northamptonshire
- Coordinates: 52°24′39.82″N 0°43′41.98″W
- Capacity: 6,264 (1,800 seated)
- Surface: grass

Construction
- Opened: 1897
- Closed: 2011
- Demolished: 2017

Tenant
- Kettering Town F.C. (1897–2011)

Rockingham Road was a football stadium in Kettering, Northamptonshire, England. It was home to Kettering Town F.C. from 1897 until 2011.

At the time of its closure, the ground had a capacity of 6,264, of which 1,800 was seated.

In September 2017, the land was sold by the owner, Ben Pickering Limited. The site was first identified as a potential site for housing in 2005 by the local authority, and press reports indicated that the new owner was likely to use the land for a housing development.

During November 2017, the entire stadium and associated structures were demolished and the site cleared for redevelopment.

== Repossession ==
On 4 August 2011, Kettering Town Club moved into Nene Park after agreeing to a long-term-lease with the landlord.

On 19 December 2011, the ground was repossessed by bailiffs acting on behalf of the owner, Ben Pickering. A notice on the entry to the ground read,

"Pursuant to Clause 5 of the [May 1998 lease between Kettering Town Management Ltd and Ben Pickering Ltd], we as authorised agents of the said Ben Pickering Ltd have this day re-entered the premises demised by the said lease and the said lease is thereby determined absolutely."

Despite football being no longer played at the grounds, its social club was still in use by the supporters-trust and was also being used for storage of club stock which is still there.
