= Bulmers =

Cider brand of H. P. Bulmer

Bulmers cider is one of a number of brands owned by British cider maker H. P. Bulmer of Hereford, a Heineken subsidiary. It is one of the biggest selling British bottled cider brands in the UK with a number of variants including Bulmers Original & Pear. It should not be confused with Bulmers Irish Cider, sold outside the Republic of Ireland as Magners.

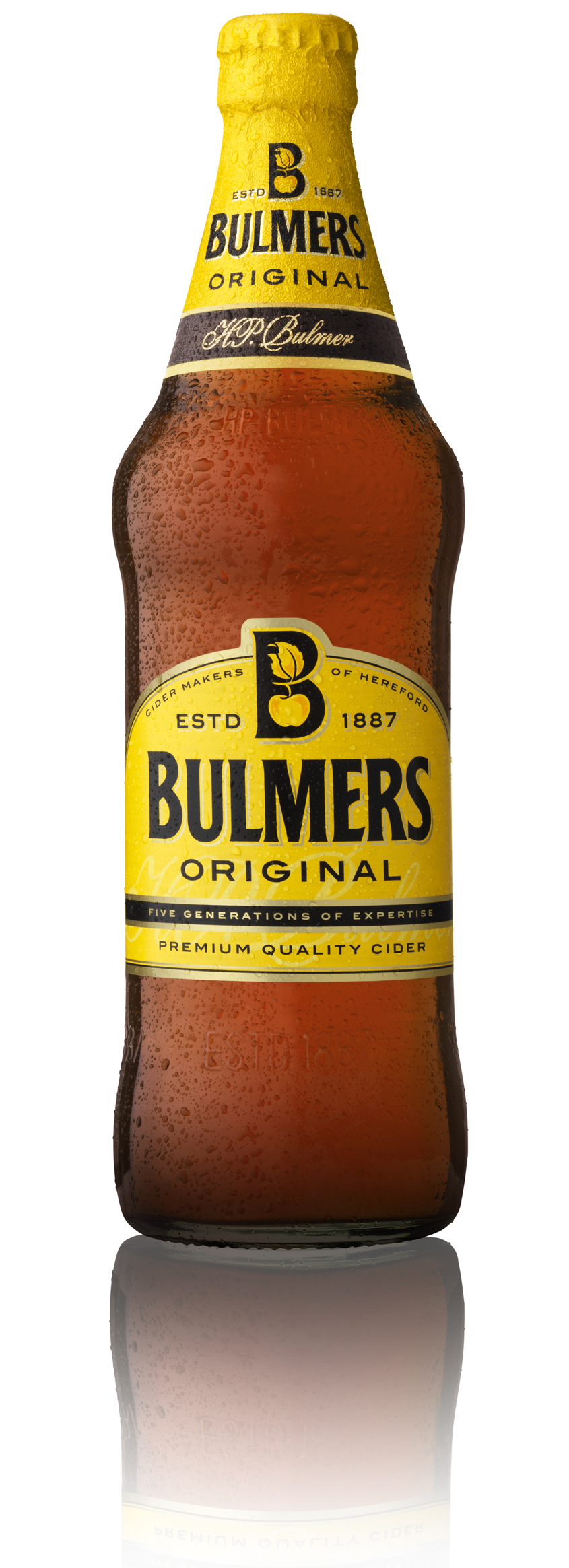
Bulmers Original Cider bottle from 2011

== History ==
Fred and Percy Bulmer grew the apples at their family orchard at Credenhill in Herefordshire which would be later used to make the cider for which they became known. Production was initially at Ryelands Street in Hereford, the original buildings, including cider cellars survives today as the Cider Museum and King Offa Distillery. Production moved to the current Plough Lane site in the late 1970s. Today HP Bulmer makes 65% of the UK's five hundred million litres of cider sold annually, and the bulk of the UK's cider exports. From 1937 to 1949, Bulmers operated with Wm. Magners of Clonmel, expanding into Irish distribution markets. From 1949 Magners withdrew from this partnership but retained rights to trade under the name HP Bulmer Ltd in Ireland.

In 2003, the Hereford-based firm was bought for £278 million by Scottish & Newcastle (S&N) with the loss of some 200 jobs initially. In 2008, S&N were bought for £7.8 billion by the Carlsberg and Heineken groups. Bulmers now only survives as a brand name and subsidiary of the Dutch Heineken group, with operations in Hereford scaled back to focus mainly on the production of cider.

During spring 2006, the company relaunched Bulmers Original in the UK, aimed at the "served over ice" market, which had grown in popularity over the past few years. Bulmers Original is a 4.5% ABV cider, primarily sold in pint bottles (568 ml). In November 2007, Bulmers pear cider was launched.

In summer 2011, Bulmers relaunched with a new look and new bottles. In reference to the Bulmers naming tradition dating back to the early 1900s (at the time these were Bulmers 1 through to 8), they number-coded the then-current and all future varieties with Original as "No. 9", Pear as "No. 10" and Crisp Blend as "No. 15". At the same time, the Red Berry and Lime flavour was launched as "No. 17".

In March 2013, two new flavours; "Bulmers Cider Bold Black Cherry" and "Bulmers Cider Pressed Red Grape", number-coded "No. 19" and "No. 20" respectively, were added to the range. In March 2014, two lower-alcohol flavours were added: Bulmers Cider Five Fruit Harvest and Bulmers Cider Indian Summer, number-coded "No. 21" and "No. 22" and with an ABV of 2.8%.

In 2015, the red grape flavour was discontinued and replaced with a new flavour "Zesty Blood Orange", number-coded as "No. 23". The black cherry flavour was discontinued the following year and replaced with "Wild Blueberry and Lime", number-coded as "No. 24".

In 2016, Bulmers rebranded yet again, now with bottles of smaller volume at 500 ml

2017 introduced the "Orchard Pioneers" range, 'artisanal' ciders created by the company's suppliers; the range opened with "Kier's Cloudy Apple Cider" (Kier Rogers) and "Sarah's Red Apple Cider" (Sarah Hawkins), number-coded as "No. 25" and "No. 26" respectively.

As of 2021, only the Original and Red Berry & Lime flavours remain available.

== Ingredients ==
In 2014, a study by The Daily Telegraph found that a pint of Bulmers cider contained five teaspoons (20.5g) of sugar, nearly as much as the WHO recommends as an adult's daily allowance of added sugar, and 5-10 times the sugar of lager or ale.

By law, all cider produced in the UK must contain a minimum of 35% apple juice, but this can be imported concentrate. Bulmers do not disclose the percentage of apple juice in their product.

== Current range ==
There are currently only two flavours.

- Bulmers Original Cider
- Bulmers Crushed Red Berries and Lime Cider
- Orchard Pioneers: Kier's Cloudy Apple Cider
- Orchard Pioneers: Sarah's Red Apple Cider

== Limited edition variants ==
Bulmers have produced several limited edition flavours:

Bulmers Light, introduced in Spring 2008, had the same ABV as Bulmers Original but with 30% fewer calories. However this was delisted a year later due to poor sales.

In Summer 2010, a limited-edition version was made, combining both apple and pear flavours in one and named 'Summer Blend'. In Autumn 2010, another limited-edition version was created, made using Katy apples which are allowed to fully ripen in the orchards before harvesting, and named "Red Apple".

In the Summer 2011, Bulmers released the limited edition "Crisp Blend" which is made from sharper tasting apples, with a crisp and slightly drier flavour than Original. It was available in pint bottles only. To celebrate the 125th anniversary of the brand in 2012, Bulmers released Bulmers Vintage Reserve ("No. 18"), made with 100% bittersweet apples from the previous year's crop.
