= 2000 FA Trophy final =

2000 FA Trophy Final
- Event: 1999–2000 FA Trophy
Kettering Town	Kingstonian
2	3
- Date: 13 May 2000
- Venue: Wembley Stadium, London
- Man of the Match: Eddie Akuamoah (Kingstonian)
- Referee: Steve Dunn
- Attendance: 20,034

The 2000 FA Trophy Final was the 31st final of The Football Association's cup competition for levels 5–8 of the English football league system. It was contested by Kettering Town and Kingstonian on 13 May 2000 at Wembley Stadium, London.

Kingstonian won the match 3–2 after recovering from a 2-1 deficit with Eddie Akuamoah scoring twice and Amara Simba scoring the winning goal. . The match was attended by a crowd of 20,034 spectators.

== Route to the final ==
=== Kettering Town ===
Date Round	Home team	Score	Away team	Venue

27 November 1999 2	Kettering Town	2 - 2	Thame United	Kettering
15:00				Stadium: Rockingham Road

30 November 1999 2r	Thame United	0 - 1	Kettering Town	Thame
19:45				Stadium: Windmill Road

15 January 2000 3	Kettering Town	2 - 0	Welling United	Kettering
15:00				Stadium: Rockingham Road

5 February 2000 4	Kettering Town	2 - 2	Walton & Hersham	Kettering
15:00				Stadium: Rockingham Road

8 February 2000 4r	Walton & Hersham	0 - 2	Kettering Town	Walton-on-Thames
19:45				Stadium: Stompond Lane

26 February 2000 5	Workington	0 - 1	Kettering Town	Workington
19:45				Stadium: Borough Park

11 March 2000 QF	Kettering Town	2 - 2	Bishop Auckland	Kettering
15:00				Stadium: Rockingham Road

15 March 2000 QFr	Bishop Auckland	0 - 2	Kettering Town	Bishop Auckland
19:45				Stadium: Kingsway

1 April 2000 SF-1	Kettering Town	1 - 0	Telford United	Kettering
15:00				Stadium: Rockingham Road

15 April 2000 SF-2	Telford United	0 - 0 (0 - 1 agg.)	Kettering Town	Telford
15:00				Stadium: Bucks Head

=== Kingstonian ===
Date Round	Home team	Score	Away team	Venue

27 November 1999 2	Folkestone Invicta	0 - 1	Kingstonian	Folkestone
15:00		Report		Stadium: Cheriton Road; Attendance: 727

15 January 2000 4	Wealdstone	0 – 5	Kingstonian	London
15:00		Report		Stadium: White Lion Ground; Attendance: 639

5 February 2000 4	Kingstonian	2 - 1	Moor Green	Kingston upon Thames
15:00		Report		Stadium: Kingsmeadow; Attendance: 623

26 February 2000 5	Yeovil Town	0 - 1	Kingstonian	Yeovil
15:00		Report		Stadium: Huish Park; Attendance: 3,330

11 March 2000 QF	Kingstonian	0 - 0	Southport	Kingston upon Thames
15:00		Report		Stadium: Kingsmeadow; Attendance: 1,201

14 March 2000 QFr	Southport	0 - 1	Kingstonian	Southport
19:45		Report		Stadium: Haig Avenue; Attendance: 1,576

1 April 2000 SF-1	Sutton United	1 - 1	Kingstonian	Sutton, London
15:00		Report		Stadium: Gander Green Lane; Attendance: 2,384

18 April 2000 SF-2	Kingstonian	6 - 0 (7 - 1 agg.)	Sutton United	Kingston upon Thames
19:45		Report		Stadium: Kingsmeadow; Attendance: 2,309

== Match ==
=== Details ===
13 May 2000
15:00 BST

Kettering Town	2–3	Kingstonian
Vowden 55'; Norman 64' (pen.)	Report	Akuamoah 40', 69'; Simba 75'

Wembley Stadium, London
Attendance: 20,034
Referee: Steve Dunn (Gloucester)

1	GK	(England) Adam Sollitt
6	DF	(England) Craig Norman (substituted off) 73'
4	DF	(England) Chris Perkins
5	DF	(England) Colin Vowden (c)
11	DF	(England) Gary Setchell (substituted off) 80'
3	MF	(England) Carl Adams
7	MF	(England) Matt Fisher
8	FW	(England) Phil Brown (yellow card)
2	FW	(England) Brett McNamara
9	FW	(England) Carl Shutt
10	FW	(England) Dale Watkins (substituted off) 45'
Substitutes:
18	GK	(England) Steve Wilson
16	DF	(England) Ian Ridgway
15	MF	(England) Craig Hopkins (substituted on) 80'
12	FW	(England) Lee Hudson (substituted on) 45'
14	FW	(England) Wayne Diuk (substituted on) 73'
Manager:
(England) Peter Morris

1	GK	(England) Steve Farrelly
3	DF	(England) Colin Luckett
4	DF	(England) Matt Crossley (c)
5	DF	(England) Simon Stewart (substituted off) 75'
6	DF	(England) Mark Harris
2	MF	(England) Tarkan Mustafa
7	MF	(England) Junior Kadi (substituted off) 82'
8	MF	(England) Geoff Pitcher
10	FW	(France) Amara Simba
10	FW	(England) Ronnie Green (substituted off) 85'
11	FW	(England) Eddie Akuamoah
Substitutes:
13	GK	(England) Richard Hurst
14	DF	(England) Eddie Saunders (substituted on) 75'
16	DF	(England) Luke Basford (substituted on) 85'
15	DF	(Scotland) Derek Allan
12	FW	(England) Dave Leworthy (substituted on) 82'
Manager:
(England) Geoff Chapple

Match rules

- 90 minutes.
- 30 minutes of extra time if necessary.
- Penalty shootout if scores still level.
- Five named substitutes.
- Maximum of three substitutions.
