= 1984 FA Trophy final =

1984 FA Trophy Final
- Event: 1983–84 FA Trophy
Northwich Victoria	Bangor City
3	2

Final
Northwich Victoria	Bangor City
1	1
- Date: 12 May 1984
- Venue: Wembley Stadium, London
- Attendance: 14,500

Replay
Northwich Victoria	Bangor City
2	1
- Date: 15 May 1984
- Venue: Victoria Ground, Stoke-on-Trent

The 1984 FA Trophy Final was the 15th final of the FA Trophy, the Football Association's cup competition for non-League teams.

The final was contested between Northwich Victoria and Bangor City. Northwich were beaten finalists a year earlier, but it was Bangor's first final. This was the first meeting of the two sides in a major cup final since the 1889 Welsh Cup Final.

The match at Wembley Stadium ended in a 1–1 draw, so a replay was played at Stoke City's Victoria Ground. Northwich Victoria won the replay 2–1.

== Final ==
12 May 1984
15:00

Northwich Victoria	1–1	Bangor City

Wembley Stadium, London
Attendance: 14,500 Bangor Scorer was Whelan

=== Replay ===
15 May 1984
19:30

Northwich Victoria	2–1	Bangor City

Victoria Ground, Stoke-on-Trent
