= 1994 FA Trophy final =

1994 FA Trophy Final
Vauxhall FA Trophy Final
- Event: 1993–94 FA Trophy
Woking	Runcorn
2	1
- Date: 21 May 1994
- Venue: Wembley Stadium, London
- Referee: Paul Durkin
- Attendance: 15,818

The 1993–94 FA Trophy Final, known as the 1994 Vauxhall FA Trophy Final for sponsorship reasons, was the final match of the 1993–94 FA Trophy. It was the 25th season of the competition for teams from the Conference and other semi-professional teams below this level. The match was held on Saturday 21 May 1994 at Wembley Stadium, London, and was contested by Woking and Runcorn. Woking were appearing in the final for the first time and Runcorn were appearing in the final for a third time.

Goals from Dereck Brown (19th minute) and Darran Hay (29th minute) gave Woking a 2–0 lead at half-time. Runcorn scored a 75th minute consolation goal from the penalty spot through Nigel Shaw. Woking won the game 2-1 and this would prove to be their first FA Trophy final win of three in four seasons.
