= 1993–94 FA Trophy =

FA Challenge Trophy

Tournament details
- Country: England; Wales
- Teams: 180

Final positions
- Champions: Woking
- Runners-up: Runcorn

The 1993–94 FA Trophy was the twenty-fifth season of the FA Trophy.

== First qualifying round ==
=== Ties ===
Tie	Home team	Score	Away team
1	Ashford Town (Kent)	3-1	Windsor & Eton
2	Ashton United	1-2	Chester-Le-Street Town
3	Atherstone United	1-1	Redditch United
4	Barking	0-1	Billericay Town
5	Basingstoke Town	0-2	Abingdon Town
6	Berkhamsted Town	1-1	Yeading
7	Bishop's Stortford	1-0	Braintree Town
8	Brandon United	0-2	Seaham Red Star
9	Bridlington Town	4-0	Ferryhill Athletic
10	Bromley	0-2	Molesey
11	Burton Albion	3-0	Caernarfon Town
12	Buxton	0-0	Curzon Ashton
13	Consett	2-2	Hebburn
14	Croydon	3-0	Canterbury City
15	Dorking	1-5	Sittingbourne
16	Droylsden	2-0	Solihull Borough
17	Dudley Town	3-2	Mossley
18	Dulwich Hamlet	2-1	Hastings Town
19	Dunston Federation Brewery	3-0	Easington Colliery
20	Durham City	0-1	Tow Law Town
21	Fareham Town	1-2	Weston Super Mare
22	Fisher '93	1-0	Walton & Hersham
23	Fleetwood Town	0-6	Great Harwood Town
24	Gainsborough Trinity	5-3	Eastwood Town
25	Grantham Town	5-2	Bedworth United
26	Gravesend & Northfleet	3-0	Bognor Regis Town
27	Gresley Rovers	1-2	Goole Town
28	Hendon	1-2	Marlow
29	Hitchin Town	0-2	Boreham Wood
30	Horwich RMI	0-2	Congleton Town
31	Leicester United	0-2	Moor Green
32	Leyton	6-4	Chalfont St Peter
33	Margate	0-2	Worthing
34	Matlock Town	0-0	Knowsley United
35	Newport AFC	1-0	Havant Town
36	Peterlee Newtown	0-2	Workington
37	Ruislip Manor	1-4	Chelmsford City
38	Salisbury City	1-3	Poole Town
39	Shildon	1-1	Harrogate Town
40	Sudbury Town	3-3	Purfleet
41	Sutton Coldfield Town	1-1	Colwyn Bay
42	Tamworth	3-2	Worksop Town
43	Tooting & Mitcham United	3-1	Whyteleafe
44	Uxbridge	1-2	Harrow Borough
45	Weymouth	0-2	Witney Town
46	Whitley Bay	1-1	Chorley
47	Wokingham Town	1-0	Maidenhead United

=== Replays ===
Tie	Home team	Score	Away team
3	Redditch United	2-0	Atherstone United
6	Yeading	2-0	Berkhamsted Town
12	Curzon Ashton	2-4	Buxton
13	Hebburn	1-2	Consett
34	Knowsley United	1-1	Matlock Town
39	Harrogate Town	4-2	Shildon
40	Purfleet	3-0	Sudbury Town
41	Colwyn Bay	4-0	Sutton Coldfield Town
46	Chorley	3-1	Whitley Bay

=== 2nd replays ===
Tie	Home team	Score	Away team
34	Matlock Town	3-0	Knowsley United

== Second qualifying round ==
=== Ties ===
Tie	Home team	Score	Away team
1	Abingdon Town	1-1	Wokingham Town
2	Alfreton Town	2-0	Congleton Town
3	Ashford Town (Kent)	1-1	Gravesend & Northfleet
4	Baldock Town	2-3	Purfleet
5	Bishop's Stortford	1-2	Billericay Town
6	Buxton	1-6	Colwyn Bay
7	Cambridge City	1-1	Chelmsford City
8	Consett	3-0	Chester-Le-Street Town
9	Croydon	1-7	Worthing
10	Dunston Federation Brewery	2-1	Newcastle Blue Star
11	Fisher '93	0-2	Dulwich Hamlet
12	Gainsborough Trinity	1-2	Matlock Town
13	Goole Town	3-1	Dudley Town
14	Grantham Town	3-2	Droylsden
15	Guiseley	4-3	Tow Law Town
16	Harrogate Town	3-1	Chorley
17	Harrow Borough	0-0	Boreham Wood
18	Marlow	1-1	Hayes
19	Molesey	0-4	Sittingbourne
20	Poole Town	1-1	Waterlooville
21	Redditch United	2-0	Moor Green
22	Rushden & Diamonds	0-1	Burton Albion
23	Seaham Red Star	3-1	West Auckland Town
24	Stockton	2-1	Great Harwood Town
25	Stourbridge	0-1	Halesowen Town
26	Tamworth	2-2	Emley
27	Tooting & Mitcham United	1-2	Erith & Belvedere
28	Wembley	1-1	Staines Town
29	Weston Super Mare	2-0	Newport AFC
30	Witney Town	0-1	Dorchester Town
31	Workington	0-2	Bridlington Town
32	Yeading	1-1	Leyton

=== Replays ===
Tie	Home team	Score	Away team
1	Wokingham Town	2-1	Abingdon Town
3	Gravesend & Northfleet	2-0	Ashford Town (Kent)
7	Chelmsford City	3-2	Cambridge City
17	Boreham Wood	1-2	Harrow Borough
18	Hayes	2-3	Marlow
20	Waterlooville	2-0	Poole Town
26	Emley	4-0	Tamworth
28	Staines Town	1-0	Wembley
32	Leyton	1-3	Yeading

== Third qualifying round ==
=== Ties ===
Tie	Home team	Score	Away team
1	Alfreton Town	4-1	Bridlington Town
2	Barrow	2-2	Emley
3	Billericay Town	2-0	Yeading
4	Bishop Auckland	2-2	Murton
5	Burton Albion	1-2	Halesowen Town
6	Colwyn Bay	2-2	Guisborough Town
7	Consett	1-3	Billingham Synthonia
8	Dorchester Town	0-0	Bashley
9	Dulwich Hamlet	2-1	Gloucester City
10	Dunston Federation Brewery	1-5	Frickley Athletic
11	Enfield	2-1	Corby Town
12	Erith & Belvedere	1-4	Weston Super Mare
13	Goole Town	1-1	Northallerton Town
14	Gravesend & Northfleet	1-4	Marlow
15	Harrogate Town	3-4	Guiseley
16	Hyde United	2-0	Accrington Stanley
17	Leek Town	0-2	Stevenage Borough
18	Matlock Town	1-3	Blyth Spartans
19	Nuneaton Borough	2-2	Aylesbury United
20	Purfleet	3-2	Heybridge Swifts
21	Redditch United	1-1	Hednesford Town
22	Seaham Red Star	0-3	Gretna
23	Sittingbourne	1-2	Kingstonian
24	Staines Town	0-3	St Albans City
25	Stockton	0-3	Spennymoor United
26	Trowbridge Town	1-1	Cheltenham Town
27	VS Rugby	0-3	Chelmsford City
28	Waterlooville	3-0	Wokingham Town
29	Wealdstone	2-2	Harrow Borough
30	Wivenhoe Town	1-2	Grantham Town
31	Worcester City	1-1	Crawley Town
32	Worthing	3-0	Carshalton Athletic

=== Replays ===
Tie	Home team	Score	Away team
2	Emley	2-1	Barrow
4	Murton	1-4	Bishop Auckland
6	Guisborough Town	2-3	Colwyn Bay
8	Bashley	3-0	Dorchester Town
13	Northallerton Town	1-0	Goole Town
19	Aylesbury United	1-2	Nuneaton Borough
21	Hednesford Town	1-0	Redditch United
26	Cheltenham Town	1-0	Trowbridge Town
29	Harrow Borough	3-0	Wealdstone
31	Crawley Town	1-2	Worcester City

== 1st round ==
The teams that given byes to this round are Halifax Town, Bromsgrove Rovers, Dagenham & Redbridge, Yeovil Town, Slough Town, Stafford Rangers, Bath City, Woking, Kidderminster Harriers, Altrincham, Northwich Victoria, Stalybridge Celtic, Kettering Town, Gateshead, Telford United, Merthyr Tydfil, Witton Albion, Macclesfield Town, Runcorn, Welling United, Dover Athletic, Southport, Farnborough Town, Boston United, Marine, Winsford United, Morecambe, Chesham United, Sutton United, Grays Athletic, Warrington Town and Whitby Town.

=== Ties ===
Tie	Home team	Score	Away team
1	Alfreton Town	0-5	Runcorn
2	Altrincham	0-2	Stafford Rangers
3	Bashley	2-4	Woking
4	Billericay Town	0-2	Slough Town
5	Billingham Synthonia	2-1	Frickley Athletic
6	Blyth Spartans	1-3	Bishop Auckland
7	Boston United	1-1	Macclesfield Town
8	Cheltenham Town	1-0	Nuneaton Borough
9	Dulwich Hamlet	1-2	Kingstonian
10	Enfield	2-0	Purfleet
11	Farnborough Town	1-1	Grays Athletic
12	Grantham Town	3-2	Witton Albion
13	Gretna	1-1	Warrington Town
14	Halesowen Town	0-2	Gateshead
15	Halifax Town	2-1	Emley
16	Harrow Borough	3-3	Worcester City
17	Hednesford Town	1-0	Whitby Town
18	Kettering Town	2-1	Stevenage Borough
19	Kidderminster Harriers	0-2	Dagenham & Redbridge
20	Marine	0-0	Southport
21	Morecambe	2-1	Northwich Victoria
22	Spennymoor United	2-1	Hyde United
23	St Albans City	4-5	Merthyr Tydfil
24	Stalybridge Celtic	1-1	Colwyn Bay
25	Sutton United	2-0	Chesham United
26	Telford United	2-1	Northallerton Town
27	Waterlooville	1-1	Bromsgrove Rovers
28	Welling United	6-1	Chelmsford City
29	Weston Super Mare	0-2	Dover Athletic
30	Winsford United	0-1	Guiseley
31	Worthing	3-0	Marlow
32	Yeovil Town	3-3	Bath City

=== Replays ===
Tie	Home team	Score	Away team
7	Macclesfield Town	1-0	Boston United
11	Grays Athletic	2-0	Farnborough Town
13	Warrington Town	2-3	Gretna
16	Worcester City	5-3	Harrow Borough
20	Southport	3-1	Marine
24	Colwyn Bay	2-2	Stalybridge Celtic
27	Bromsgrove Rovers	2-1	Waterlooville
32	Bath City	4-0	Yeovil Town

=== 2nd replay ===
Tie	Home team	Score	Away team
24	Colwyn Bay	2-1	Stalybridge Celtic

== 2nd round ==
=== Ties ===
Tie	Home team	Score	Away team
1	Cheltenham Town	1-0	Hednesford Town
2	Colwyn Bay	0-3	Southport
3	Dagenham & Redbridge	1-2	Woking
4	Gateshead	0-0	Gretna
5	Grantham Town	1-2	Bishop Auckland
6	Grays Athletic	1-2	Bromsgrove Rovers
7	Guiseley	3-2	Stafford Rangers
8	Kettering Town	2-2	Billingham Synthonia
9	Kingstonian	0-2	Merthyr Tydfil
10	Morecambe	1-0	Slough Town
11	Runcorn	2-1	Telford United
12	Spennymoor United	1-2	Halifax Town
13	Sutton United	6-1	Bath City
14	Welling United	1-3	Dover Athletic
15	Worcester City	0-0	Macclesfield Town
16	Worthing	1-1	Enfield

=== Replays ===
Tie	Home team	Score	Away team
4	Gretna	0-1	Gateshead
8	Billingham Synthonia	3-1	Kettering Town
15	Macclesfield Town	3-2	Worcester City
16	Enfield	2-0	Worthing

== 3rd round ==
=== Ties ===
Tie	Home team	Score	Away team
1	Bishop Auckland	2-2	Enfield
2	Cheltenham Town	0-0	Guiseley
3	Gateshead	3-2	Merthyr Tydfil
4	Macclesfield Town	0-1	Billingham Synthonia
5	Morecambe	2-1	Southport
6	Runcorn	1-1	Halifax Town
7	Sutton United	0-0	Dover Athletic
8	Woking	3-2	Bromsgrove Rovers

=== Replays ===
Tie	Home team	Score	Away team
1	Enfield	2-1	Bishop Auckland
2	Guiseley	1-0	Cheltenham Town
6	Halifax Town	0-2	Runcorn
7	Dover Athletic	2-3	Sutton United

== 4th round ==
=== Ties ===
Tie	Home team	Score	Away team
1	Gateshead	0-3	Runcorn
2	Sutton United	1-1	Enfield
3	Woking	1-1	Billingham Synthonia
4	Guiseley	3-2	Morecambe

=== Replays ===
Tie	Home team	Score	Away team
2	Enfield	1-0	Sutton United
3	Billingham Synthonia	1-2	Woking

== Semi finals ==
=== First leg ===
Tie	Home team	Score	Away team
1	Runcorn	1-1	Guiseley
2	Woking	1-1	Enfield

=== Second leg ===
Tie	Home team	Score	Away team	Aggregate
1	Guiseley	0-1	Runcorn	1-2
2	Enfield	0-0	Woking	1-1

=== Replay ===
Tie	Home team	Score	Away team
2	Woking	3-0	Enfield

== Final ==
=== Tie ===
Home team	Score	Away team
Woking	2-1	Runcorn
