= Croydon Municipal F.C. =

Croydon Municipal
- Full name: Croydon Municipal Football Club
- Nickname(s): The Lions
- Founded: 2009
- Dissolved: 2010
- Ground: Croydon Arena, Croydon
- Capacity: 8,000
- 2009–10: Combined Counties League Division One, 14th (folded)
Home colours

Croydon Municipal F.C. was a short-lived English football club based in Croydon, Greater London. They played at the Croydon Arena.

== History ==
The club was established in 2009 from the reserve team of Croydon, although they remained a feeder club. They were immediately elected into Division One of the Combined Counties League. The club finished fourteenth in their first season, and reached the final of the Division One Cup, but left the league at the end of the season.
