= Geoff Chapple =

English footballer and manager

Personal information
- Position: Forward

Team information
- Current team: Woking (caretaker)

Senior career*
Years	Team	Apps	(Gls)
?–1971	Woking		
?-1979	Alton Town		
1979-1980	Windsor & Eton		

Managerial career
- 1979: Alton Town
- 1983-1984: Windsor & Eton
- 1984–1997: Woking
- 1997–2001: Kingstonian
- 2001–2002: Woking
- 2018: Woking (caretaker)
- * Club domestic league appearances and goals

Geoff Chapple (born November 1945) is an English a former non-league football manager. His achievements include winning the FA Trophy five times in seven years with Woking (1994, 1995 & 1997) and Kingstonian (1999 & 2000).

== Career ==
Chapple played amateur football as a forward, but broke his leg in an FA Vase match in 1980, and turned to management. Initially player-manager of Alton Town, he soon moved to a purely managerial post at Windsor & Eton.

Chapple first joined Woking in the 1984–85 season and went on to lead them on their famous FA Cup run in 1991 which saw them beat West Bromwich Albion 4–2 at The Hawthorns, after which he quit working as a financial consultant to become a full-time manager. Under him, the team also achieved three FA Trophy victories.

Chapple left the club in 1997, apparently frustrated by its refusal to provide him with a written contract, and went to manage Kingstonian, taking the club up to the Conference, and winning a further two FA Trophy titles. However, he was sacked in 2001, after the team suffered relegation. He then returned to Woking, although this time he was not so successful and parted company with the club in October 2002.

Out of management, Chapple became a courier, but maintained a link with football as the Chairman of Farnham Town F.C. He was appointed as the Commercial Manager of Woking in the Autumn of 2008.

Chapple reportedly made a surprise return to football management on 3 April 2018 at the age of 72, when Woking's board of directors parted company with former boss Anthony Limbrick. In a statement, it said the Kingfield club had put the five-time FA Trophy winner in temporary charge of first team affairs in a bid to preserve The Cards National League status.

However, while Chapple allowed himself to be interviewed as Woking's interim manager, he was not present in the dugout for any of The Cards remaining five National League fixtures, which was later described as a publicity stunt to initially appease supporters, but backfired. Instead, the onus fell heavily on the shoulders of former Stevenage and AFC Wimbledon midfielder Jason Goodliffe, assisted by Matt Gray. The coaching-duo rejuvenated the team's performance on the pitch, although they did not have enough time to spare Woking of relegation to National League South on 28 April 2018, losing 2–1 at home to Dover Athletic.
