= List of Welling United F.C. seasons =

Welling United Football Club are an English football club, based in Welling in the London Borough of Bexley. The club was founded in 1963 and began as a youth team playing in the Eltham & District Sunday League on a park pitch from 1963-64 to 1970-71. From 1971-72 to 1974-75 they played in the Metropolitan-London League (Intermediate/Reserves) Division. In 1975-76 they played in the London Spartan League- Reserve Division 1. They gained senior status in the London Spartan League in 1976 at Butterfly Lane, Eltham. They finished 6th in Division 2 in 1976-77 and were promoted to the Premier Division. 1977-78 was their first season at Park View Road. Welling United currently play in the National League South.

== Key ==
Key to league record

- Level = Level of the league in the current league system
- Pld = Games played
- W = Games won
- D = Games drawn
- L = Games lost
- GF = Goals for
- GA = Goals against
- GD = Goals difference
- Pts = Points
- Position = Position in the final league table
- Top scorer and number of goals scored shown in bold when he was also top scorer for the division.

Key to cup records

- Res = Final reached round
- Rec = Final club record in the form of wins-draws-losses
- PR = Preliminary round
- QR1 (2, etc.) = Qualifying Cup rounds
- R1 (2, etc.) = Proper Cup rounds
- QF = Quarter-finals
- SF = Semi-finals
- RU = Runners-up
- W = Winners

== Seasons ==
Year	League	Lvl	Pld	W	D	L	GF	GA	GD	Pts	Position	Leading league scorer		FA Cup		FA Trophy		Average home attendance (Note: Average home attendance = for league games only)
Year	League	Lvl	Pld	W	D	L	GF	GA	GD	Pts	Position	Name	Goals	Res	Rec	Res	Rec	Average home attendance
1977–78	London Spartan; League		30	15	4	11	45	39	6	34	**6th of 16**; Transferred			-	-	-	-	
1978–79	Athenian; League	7	36	17	9	10	60	46	14	43	**7th of 19**			QR1	0-0-1	-	-	
1979–80	Athenian; League	7	38	20	7	11	86	46	40	47	**5th of 20**			QR4	4-1-1	-	-	
1980–81	Athenian; League	7	38	19	8	11	62	48	14	46	**7th of 20**; Promoted			QR2	1-0-1	-	-	
1981–82	Southern Football League; Southern Division	6	46	19	13	14	70	48	22	51	**8th of 24**; Transferred (Note: At the end of the season a single Premier Division was formed at the top of the Southern Football League with regionalized Midland and Southern divisions below. Welling United qualified to get a place in the Premier Division.)			QR2	1-3-1	-	-	
1982–83	Southern Football League; Premier Division	6	38	21	6	11	63	40	23	69	**3rd of 20**			QR2	1-0-1	QR1	0-0-1	
1983–84	Southern Football League; Premier Division	6	38	15	7	16	61	61	0	52	**12th of 20**			QR1	0-0-1	R2	2-1-1	
1984–85	Southern Football League; Premier Division	6	38	18	11	9	55	38	17	65	**6th of 20**			QR3	2-0-1	R3	3-2-1	
1985–86	Southern Football League; Premier Division	6	38	29	6	3	95	31	64	93	**1st of 20**; Promoted			QR3	2-1-1	R1	0-0-1	
1986–87	Football; Conference	5	42	10	10	22	61	94	-22	40	**20th of 22**; Reprieved (Note: Club reprieved after Nuneaton Borough were relegated due to financial irregularities.)	Gary Abbott	23	R1	4-1-1	R2	1-0-1	704
1987–88	Football; Conference	5	42	11	9	22	50	72	-22	42	**19th of 22**			R2	5-1-1	R1	1-0-1	873
1988–89	Football; Conference	5	40	14	11	15	45	46	-1	53	**11th of 21**			R3	3-2-1	QF	4-2-1	1,017
1989–90	Football; Conference	5	42	18	10	14	62	50	12	64	**6th of 22**	Terry Robbins	17	R2	2-4-1	R2	1-1-1	1,107
1990–91	Football; Conference	5	42	13	15	14	55	57	-2	54	**11th of 22**	Terry Robbins	18	R1	1-0-1	R3	2-0-1	986
1991–92	Football; Conference	5	42	14	12	16	69	79	-10	54	**12th of 22**	**Terry Robbins**	**29**	R1	1-0-1	R2	1-0-1	840
1992–93	Football; Conference	5	42	12	12	18	57	72	-15	48	**20th of 22**	Terry Robbins	19	QR4	0-0-1	R2	1-0-1	947
1993–94	Football; Conference	5	42	13	12	17	47	49	-2	51	**16th of 22**	Terry Robbins	17	QR1	0-0-1	R2	1-0-1	967
1994–95	Football; Conference	5	42	13	10	19	57	74	-17	49	**17th of 22**			QR2	1-0-1	R2	1-2-1	739
1995–96	Football; Conference	5	42	10	15	17	42	53	-11	45	**19th of 22**			QR2	1-2-1	R2	1-1-1	615
1996–97	Football; Conference	5	42	13	9	20	50	60	-10	48	**18th of 22**	Lennie Dennis	21	R1	4-0-1	R2	1-1-1	714
1997–98	Football; Conference	5	42	17	9	16	64	62	2	60	**10th of 22**	Mark Cooper	18	QR2	1-1-1	R2	0-1-1	709
1998–99	Football; Conference	5	42	9	14	19	44	65	-21	41	**20th of 22**; Reprieved (Note: Club reprieved after Barrow were relegated due to entering administration.)			R1	2-0-1	R2	0-0-1	682
1999–2000	Football; Conference	5	42	13	8	21	54	66	-12	47	**20th of 22**; Relegated	Ritchie Hanlon	12	R1	1-0-1	R3	1-0-1	737
2000–01	Southern Football League; Premier Division	6	42	17	13	12	59	55	4	64	**4th of 22**			QR4	2-1-1	R1	0-0-1	546
2001–02	Southern Football League; Premier Division	6	42	13	12	17	69	66	3	51	**15th of 22**			R1	3-1-1	R4	2-0-1	516
2002–03	Southern Football League; Premier Division	6	42	13	12	17	55	58	−3	51	**15th of 22**			QR3	1-1-1	R1	0-1-1	570
2003–04	Southern Football League; Premier Division	6	42	16	8	18	56	58	−2	56	**9th of 22**; Transferred (Note: At the end of the season Conference North and South were formed above the Southern Football League. Welling United qualified to get a place in newly created divisions.)			QR4	1-3-1	R2	1-0-1	597
2004–05	Conference; South	6	42	15	7	20	64	68	−4	52	**16th of 22**	Paul Booth	19	QR2	0-0-1	R2	1-0-1	567
2005–06	Conference; South	6	42	16	17	9	58	44	+14	65	**9th of 22**	Danny Kedwell	19	R1	3-0-1	R3	3-0-1	606
2006–07	Conference; South	6	42	21	6	15	65	51	+14	69	**8th of 22**	Danny Kedwell	19	QR4	2-2-1	QF	4-2-1	566
2007–08	Conference; South	6	42	13	7	22	41	64	−23	46	**16th of 22**	Omari Coleman	8	QR3	1-0-1	QR3	0-0-1	526
2008–09	Conference; South	6	42	19	11	12	61	44	+17	68	**7th of 22**	Charlie Sheringham	19	QR2	0-1-1	R2	2-1-1	640
2009–10	Conference; South	6	42	18	9	15	66	51	+15	63	**9th of 22**	Lee Clarke	16	QR3	1-0-1	R1	1-0-1	538
2010–11	Conference; South	6	42	24	8	10	81	47	+34	75 (Note: Deducted 5 points for financial irregularities.)	**6th of 22**	Andy Pugh	17	QR2	0-0-1	R1	1-1-1	651
2011–12	Conference; South	6	42	24	9	9	79	47	+32	81	**3rd of 22**; Lost in PO Final	Andy Pugh	15	QR2	0-0-1	R1	1-1-1	676
2012–13	Conference; South	6	42	26	8	8	90	44	+46	86	**1st of 22**; Promoted	Ross Lafayette	19	QR4	2-2-1	R3	3-0-1	615
2013–14	Conference; Premier	5	46	16	12	18	59	61	−2	60	**16th of 24**	Ross Lafayette	16	R2	2-0-1	R1	0-0-1	811
2014–15	Conference; Premier	5	46	11	12	23	52	73	−21	45	**20th of 24**	Harry Beautyman	10	QR4	0-0-1	R1	0-1-1	727
2015–16	Conference Premier	5	46	8	11	27	35	73	−38	35	24th of 24; **Relegated**	Sahr Kabba	6	R1	1-1-1	R1	1-0-1	682
2016–17	National League South	6	42	12	7	23	64	69	−5	43	16th of 22	Adam Coombes	20	QR4	2-0-1	R3	3-0-1	539
2017–18	National League South	6	42	17	10	15	68	59	+9	61	10th of 22	Bradley Goldberg	10	QR2	0-0-1	QR3	0-0-1	533
2018–19	National League South	6	42	23	7	12	70	47	+23	76	3rd of 22; **Lost in play-off final**	Brendan Kiernan	14	QR4	2-0-1	QR3	0-1-1	740
2019–20	National League South	6	34	12	6	16	38	46	-8	42 (1.24 PPG)	12th of 22; Season abandoned	Anthony Cook	8	QR4	2-1-1	R1	1-0-1	624
2020–21	National League South	6	14	2	6	6	18	20	-2	12	21st of 21; Season declared null and void	Dipo Akinyemi	6	QR2	0-0-1	R2	0-0-1	611 (Note: Average attendance for games played in front of spectators.)
2021–22	National League South	6	40	10	8	22	46	87	-41	38	20th of 21	Dipo Akinyemi	18	QR2	0-0-1	R2	0-0-1	584
2022–23	National League South	6	46	15	14	17	57	63	-6	58 (Note: Deducted 1 point for fielding an ineligible player.)	16th of 24	Ade Azeez	15	QR4	1-1-1	R3	1-0-1	792
2023–24	National League South	6	46	12	18	16	56	71	-15	54	17th of 24	Tristan Abrahams / Kain Adom	7	QR4	2-1-1	R5	1-2-1	723
2024–25	National League South	6	46	10	8	28	47	91	-44	38	22nd of 24; **Relegated**	Gene Kennedy	8	QR2	0-0-1	R2	0-0-1	688
