= 1988–89 Newport County A.F.C. season =

Welsh association football club season

Newport County
1988–89 season
- Chairman: Jerry Sherman
- Manager: Eddie May (until August 1988); John Mahoney (after August 1988)
- Stadium: Somerton Park
- Football Conference: did not finish
- FA Cup: First round
- FA Trophy: First round
- Conference League Cup: Third round
- Welsh Cup: Fifth round
- Top goalscorer: League: Sanderson (5); All: Sugrue (14)
- Highest home attendance: 2,148 vs Maidstone United (FA Cup, 19 Nov 1988)
- Lowest home attendance: 943 vs Maidstone United (1 October 1988)
- Average home league attendance: 1,340
| Home colours | Away colours | Third colours |

The 1988–89 season was the first season played in the Football Conference by Newport County since their relegation from the Football League at the end of the 1987–88 season. The club failed to fulfil their fixtures and were expelled from the Conference midway through the season.

== Season review ==
Newport County were relegated from the Fourth Division of the Football League following a 6–0 defeat to Bolton Wanderers in April 1988. The majority of the first team players had been sold to secure the club's future as the team finished the campaign fielding players from their youth sides. Due to their financial plight, speculation was also raised that the club would drop out of the English league system and move onto the Welsh leagues, although this was dismissed by secretary Keith Saunders.

Eddie May was appointed as the club's new manager in July, but resigned from his position before the season started when the club failed to meet a deadline issued by the High Court to repay £23,000 to the landlords of Somerton Park. May had also been promised an 18-man, full-time playing squad on his arrival but had grown discontent over the failure to sign players. John Mahoney was appointed in his place, while Somerton Park was repossessed by Newport City Council on 4 August. American businessman Jerry Sherman arrived at the club soon after and was appointed chairman, having paid off the outstanding £23,000 as well as a further £80,000 of other debts the club had accumulated. The payments allowed the club to retake possession of Somerton Park, despite the resistance of the council.

Newport's first match of the season was against Stafford Rangers on 20 August. Due to the uncertainty of the club's future, the Conference had discussed plans to expel the side before the season had started and their opening fixture was not confirmed to be played until 11am of the morning of the match. The first team had played only one pre-season friendly ahead of the season and suffered a 3–0 defeat. The match was also marred by crowd trouble as the 100 travelling Newport fans clashed with police. The team were forced to wear kits leftover from the previous campaign, having failed to acquire new ones, while goalkeeper Tony Bird started having only been signed at 10pm the previous day from Welsh league side Cwmbrân Town. By resecuring the use of Somerton Park, Newport's first home fixture was able to go ahead three days later. The club endured a poor start to the campaign, gaining only four points from the first 11 matches.

In October, a winding up order was issued against the club. However, Sherman responded by taking the first team to dinner at The Cavendish Hotel following a 1–1 draw with Sutton United four days later, with an estimated cost of around £2,000. The club's hastily assembled squad struggled to adapt to quickly and, despite briefly pulling out of the relegation zone at the start of December, by the end of the month Newport were in 21st position. On 27 February, the club was officially wound up by the High Court over unpaid debts totalling £126,145. Sherman countered by claiming that the money was available but had been delayed in transfers. The club were given a brief extension following Sherman's claims, while their next two fixtures against Stafford and Welling United were postponed. Sherman entered talks over a potential phoenix club being formed under the condition that the outstanding debts would be paid. Another potential bidder, Dan McCauley pulled out of negotiations after being told he would have to pay the club's full £330,000 debts to take over ownership. The club's last league match was a 2–1 loss to Maidstone United on 11 February at Watling Street, while their last match was a bizarre 6–5 loss after extra time to Kidderminster Harriers in the Conference League Cup at Somerton Park on 21 February.

The Conference chose to expel Newport due to their failure to fulfil fixtures in March, but the decision was delayed when Sherman entered an appeal with 20 minutes remaining of the deadline. The club's assets, including memorabilia and sports equipment was due to be auctioned off to pay debtors the following morning. The auction went ahead, after a brief delay, at the Old Maltings in Newport and raised only £12,000. Sherman's appeal was rejected by the Football Association on the grounds that it could only be lodged by the club's liquidators and the team were expelled from the Conference and their record was expunged.

=== Results summary ===
| Overall | | | | | | | | Home | | | | | | Away | | | | | |
| Pld | W | D | L | GF | GA | GD | Pts | W | D | L | GF | GA | GD | W | D | L | GF | GA | GD |
|---|---|---|---|---|---|---|---|---|---|---|---|---|---|---|---|---|---|---|---|
| 29 | 4 | 7 | 18 | 31 | 62 | −31 | 19 | 3 | 3 | 7 | 18 | 26 | −8 | 1 | 4 | 11 | 13 | 36 | −23 |

Last updated: 11 Feb 1989.
Source: []

== Fixtures and results ==
=== Football Conference ===
| Date | Opponents | Venue | Result | Scorers | Attendance |
|---|---|---|---|---|---|
| 20 Aug 1988 | Stafford Rangers | A | 0–3 | | 1,654 |
| 23 Aug 1988 | Kettering Town | H | 1–2 | Millett | 1,871 |
| 27 Aug 1988 | Telford United | A | 1–3 | Withers | 1,443 |
| 29 Aug 1988 | Macclesfield Town | A | 0–3 | | 1,172 |
| 3 Sep 1988 | Aylesbury United | H | 2–2 | Ford, Withers | 1,175 |
| 5 Sep 1988 | Fisher Athletic | A | 2–3 | Evans, Sanderson | 843 |
| 10 Sep 1988 | Barnet | H | 1–7 | Evans | 1,397 |
| 13 Sep 1988 | Yeovil Town | H | 1–1 | Williams | 1,262 |
| 17 Sep 1988 | Welling United | H | 0–1 | | 1,092 |
| 24 Sep 1988 | Kidderminster Harriers | A | 1–1 | Sanderson | 1,419 |
| 27 Sep 1988 | Wycombe Wanderers | A | 0–5 | | 1,672 |
| 1 Oct 1988 | Maidstone United | H | 2–1 | Andrews, Williams | 943 |
| 8 Oct 1988 | Boston United | H | 1–1 | Marustik | 1,131 |
| 15 Oct 1988 | Altrincham | A | 0–1 | | 1,359 |
| 22 Oct 1988 | Chorley | H | 2–0 | Brignull, Withers | 1,149 |
| 5 Nov 1988 | Enfield | A | 0–3 | | 692 |
| 8 Nov 1988 | Sutton United | A | 1–1 | Sugrue | 924 |
| 12 Nov 1988 | Weymouth | H | 4–0 | Withers, Sanderson, Foley, Ford | 1,238 |
| 26 Nov 1988 | Runcorn | A | 0–0 | | 821 |
| 3 Dec 1988 | Kidderminster Harriers | H | 1–2 | Marustik | 1,560 |
| 10 Dec 1988 | Chorley | A | 2–0 | Sanderson, Marustik | 610 |
| 17 Dec 1988 | Telford United | H | 0–3 | | 1,536 |
| 26 Dec 1988 | Cheltenham Town | A | 2–3 | Banks, Sanderson | 2,288 |
| 31 Dec 1988 | Northwich Victoria | A | 1–3 | Nuttell | 830 |
| 2 Jan 1989 | Cheltenham Town | H | 0–1 | | 1,686 |
| 7 Jan 1989 | Boston United | A | 1–1 | Richards | 1,810 |
| 28 Jan 1989 | Wycombe Wanderers | H | 3–5 | Sugrue (P), Giles 2 | 1,382 |
| 4 Feb 1989 | Barnet | A | 1–4 | I Thompson | 2,526 |
| 11 Feb 1989 | Maidstone United | A | 1–2 | Richards | 857 |

These results were expunged from the records and the league table was amended as if they had never taken place.

=== FA Cup ===
| Round | Date | Opponents | Venue | Result | Scorers | Attendance |
|---|---|---|---|---|---|---|
| 4Q | 29 Oct 1988 | Weymouth | H | 2–1 | Sanderson, Brignull | 1,641 |
| 1 | 19 Nov 1988 | Maidstone United | H | 1–2 | Sugrue | 2,148 |

=== FA Trophy ===
| Round | Date | Opponents | Venue | Result | Scorers | Attendance |
|---|---|---|---|---|---|---|
| 1 | 14 Jan 1989 | Weymouth | A | 1–2 | Marustik | 1,119 |

=== Conference League Cup ===
| Round | Date | Opponents | Venue | Result | Scorers | Attendance |
|---|---|---|---|---|---|---|
| 1 | 5 Oct 1988 | Yeovil Town | A | 5–4 | Banks 2, Sanderson 2, Abbruzzese | 1,838 |
| 2 | 24 Jan 1989 | Buxton | A | 4–3 | Sugrue 3, Sanderson | 429 |
| 3 | 21 Feb 1989 | Kidderminster Harriers | H | 5–6 a.e.t. | Sugrue 2, Thomson 2, Sanderson | 895 |

=== Welsh Cup ===
| Round | Date | Opponents | Venue | Result | Scorers | Attendance |
|---|---|---|---|---|---|---|
| 3 | 15 Nov 1988 | Bridgend Town | H | 6–0 | Sugrue 3, Foley, Marustik, Richards | 817 |
| 4 | 21 Jan 1989 | Caernarfon Town | H | 3–0 | Sugrue 3 | 763 |
| 5 | 7 Feb 1989 | Hereford United | H | 0–1 | | 1,666 |
