= Sutton United 2–1 Coventry City (1989) =

Association football match

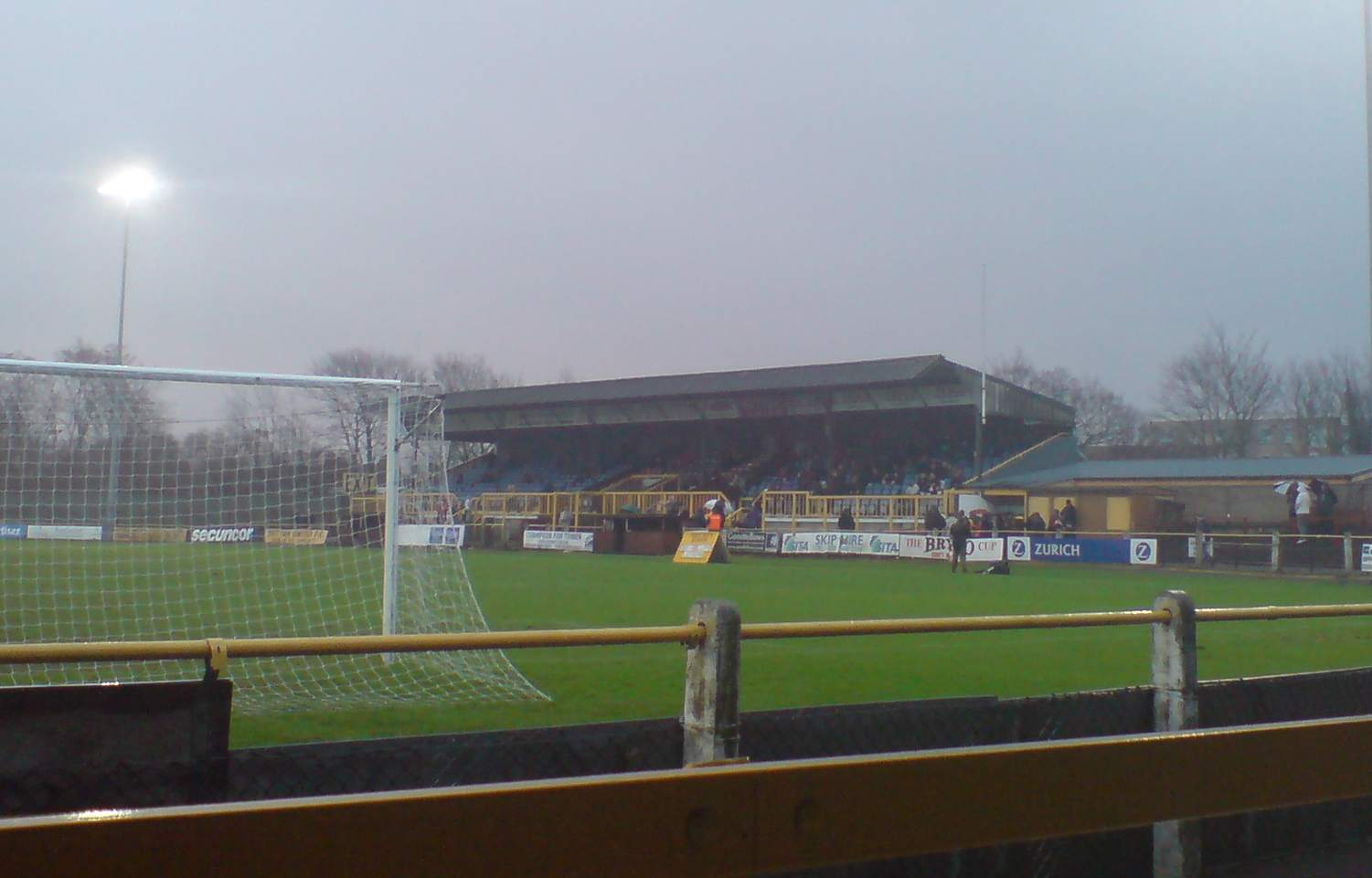
- The match took place at Gander Green Lane.
- Event: 1988–89 FA Cup
Sutton United	Coventry City
2	1
- Date: 7 January 1989
- Venue: Gander Green Lane, Sutton, London
- Referee: Alf Buksh
- Attendance: 8,000
- Weather: Cloudy

The 1988–89 FA Cup third-round match between Sutton United and Coventry City was an association football game played at Gander Green Lane in Sutton, on 7 January 1989. Coventry City entered the FA Cup in the third round, as they participated in the Football League First Division, the top tier of English league football. Sutton United of the Conference, the fifth tier of English football, had started their cup run in the 4th Qualifying round, winning three ties to reach this stage of the competition. Coventry, the away team, went into the match as strong favourites, a reflection of the gulf in divisions that separated the two teams.

The match was refereed by Alf Buksh in front of 8,000 spectators. Coventry's Brian Kilcline had the best early chance after he received the ball while unmarked in the penalty area, but his header was straight at Sutton goalkeeper Trevor Roffey. The home side took the lead three minutes before half-time when Mickey Stephens took a corner kick towards the near post which was missed by Coventry goalkeeper Steve Ogrizovic and then volleyed into the goal by Tony Rains. Seven minutes into the second half, Coventry were level after Steve Sedgley passed the ball into the Sutton penalty area, allowing David Phillips to shoot past an advancing Roffey to make it 1–1. In the 59th minute, Stephens took a corner kick short to Phil Dawson who struck an outswinging cross which Matthew Hanlan volleyed in to give Sutton the lead once again. Despite numerous late chances for Coventry, the match ended 2–1 and Sutton United progressed to the fourth round of the FA Cup.

One of the most famous 'giant-killings' in the competition's history, the match is among the few instances when a non-League side has defeated a club from the highest tier of English football. It remained the most recent such occasion for 24 years, until Luton Town beat Norwich City in the FA Cup fourth round in 2013. Oliver Danway, the head of Public Relations at Kensho Media, described the match as not only "the biggest shock in the history of the FA Cup but one of the biggest in any game ever". Sutton United went on to lose 8–0 in the fourth round to Norwich City and ended the season mid-table in the Conference. Coventry City's league form declined after the cup tie as they dropped to seventh place by the conclusion of the First Division season.

== Background ==
Sutton United's route to the third round
Round	Date	Opposition (H/A)	Score	Ref
4th qualifying round	29 October 1988	Walton & Hersham (H)	1–1	
4th qualifying round (replay)	1 November 1988	Walton & Hersham (A)	3–0	
First round	19 November 1988	Dagenham (A)	4–0	
Second round	10 December 1988	Aylesbury United (A)	1–0	

The FA Cup (formally known as the Football Association Challenge Cup) is an annual knockout football competition in men's domestic English football. First played during the 1871–72 season, it is the oldest national football competition in the world. The 1988–89 FA Cup was the 108th season of the competition.

Sutton United, a non-League club playing in the Conference (the fifth tier of English league football), had knocked out Football League teams in the previous year's FA Cup, defeating Aldershot and Peterborough United, both of the Third Division, before losing to Second Division side Middlesbrough in the third round after a replay. They had also progressed to the fourth round on one previous occasion, in the 1969–70 FA Cup, where they were beaten 6–0 by Leeds United.

Sutton United entered the 1988–89 FA Cup in the preliminary round (also referred to as the fourth qualifying round) where they were drawn against Walton & Hersham. The match was played on 29 October 1988 and ended in a 1–1 draw. The replay was held three days later and ended in a 3–0 victory for Sutton, who qualified for the first round where they were drawn away against Dagenham. Two goals from Paul McKinnon and one each from Lennie Dennis and Paul Rogers saw Sutton win 4–0. In the second round, Sutton faced Aylesbury United away in front of 2,135 spectators. A goal from Dennis secured a 1–0 win for the visitors who progressed to the third round where they faced Coventry City. Sutton were 13th in the Conference, and went into the FA Cup tie with indifferent league form, having lost away to bottom club Aylesbury United and drawn at home against Maidstone United. In contrast to their opponents, Sutton's players were not professional footballers, and their squad included bricklayers, assistant bank managers and insurance clerks. Their goalkeeper, Trevor Roffey, was the son of Dave Roffey who had played for Sutton United in their fourth-round defeat against Leeds United in 1970.

Coventry City had finished the previous season in tenth place in the Football League First Division, the highest level of English football. As a First Division club, they entered the 1988–89 FA Cup at the third round, and at that time were in fifth position in the league, having won their previous league match five days earlier 5–0, including a hat-trick from David Speedie, against Sheffield Wednesday. Coventry had been knocked out of the FA Cup in the previous season in the fourth round, losing 1–0 against Watford, but had won the competition in the 1986–87 season, beating Tottenham Hotspur 3–2 in the final.

David Lacey, writing in The Guardian, described the match as "the third round's most intriguing confrontation" while fellow journalist Russell Thomas referred to it as "Saturday's most flavoursome tie". Before the match, Sutton United were considered to be rank outsiders and had been given odds of 5,000–1 against winning the cup, although Lacey predicted that they would be inspired by Coventry's success in the 1987 competition, noting "A win for Sutton is unlikely ... A draw is a stronger possibility". Coventry were given much shorter odds of 16–1 and were considered the seventh-favourite to win the cup from the clubs remaining in the third round. Sutton's manager Barrie Williams described the match as "the glamour tie of the round" and said his side were "approaching it in a mood of optimism". Broadcaster and former player Jimmy Greaves, who had predicted a Coventry defeat before every round of the 1987 cup run, was now backing the team saying before the match that they would "go far" in the tournament. The Coventry players were also confident of victory, with club historian Jim Brown commenting that they "clowned their way through the pre-match warm-up".

The regular crowd capacity at Sutton's Gander Green Lane ground was around 6,000 but this had been expanded to 8,000 for the cup match. Although there was an option to play the game at another, larger ground or switch the fixture to Coventry City's Highfield Road, in order to maximise crowd revenue, Williams said he was content for the match to be hosted at their home ground, noting "we have gone for the romance instead ... by playing at home we feel we are in with a better chance of getting through to the next round". Russell Thomas of The Guardian suggested the match would be worth £40,000 to Sutton through gate receipts, sponsorship and media coverage.

== Match ==
=== Summary ===
The match kicked off around 2 p.m. on 7 January 1989 at Gander Green Lane in front of 8,000 spectators in cloudy conditions and was refereed by Alf Buksh. For the first two minutes of the game, Coventry were dominant, creating three chances to score, but they were unable to convert any of them into goals. This dominance was short-lived, however, as Sutton began to assert themselves in the game. Coventry had the majority of the possession in the first half, but were unable to take control of the midfield and lacked penetration on the wing. Their best chance after the opening two minutes fell to Brian Kilcline, who received the ball while unmarked in the penalty area. His header, however, was poor and aimed straight at Sutton goalkeeper Trevor Roffey. The home side took the lead three minutes before half-time when Mickey Stephens took a corner towards the near post which was missed by Coventry goalkeeper Steve Ogrizovic and then headed into the goal by Tony Rains. The half ended 1–0.

Neither side made any changes to their personnel during the interval. Seven minutes into the second half, Coventry were level. A free kick for Sutton came to nothing but allowed Coventry to break and Steve Sedgley passed the ball into the Sutton penalty area allowing David Phillips to shoot past an advancing Roffey to make it 1–1. In the 59th minute, Kilcline conceded a corner after almost heading in an own goal. From the set piece, Stephens passed short to Phil Dawson who struck an outswinging cross which Matthew Hanlan volleyed in to give Sutton the lead once again. In the 70th minute, Coventry replaced Cyrille Regis with Keith Houchen, who won a series of corners, two of which ended in goal-line clearances from Rains and Robyn Jones. Dave Bennett missed a late chance for Coventry and Roffey made a save from a Coventry header with five seconds remaining. The match ended 2–1 and Sutton United progressed to the fourth round of the FA Cup.

=== Details ===
7 January 1989
14:00

Sutton United	2–1	Coventry City
Rains 42'; Hanlan 59'	Report	Phillips 52'

Gander Green Lane, Sutton
Attendance: 8,000
Referee: Alf Buksh

Sutton United	Coventry City

GK	1	Trevor Roffey
DF	2	Robyn Jones
DF	3	Tony Rains (c)
DF	4	Nigel Golley
DF	5	Vernon Pratt
MF	6	Paul Rogers
MF	7	Mickey Stephens
MF	8	Phil Dawson
FW	9	Lennie Dennis
FW	10	Paul McKinnon
MF	11	Matthew Hanlan
Manager:
Barrie Williams

GK	1	Steve Ogrizovic
DF	2	Brian Borrows
DF	3	David Phillips
DF	4	Steve Sedgley
DF	5	Brian Kilcline (c)
DF	6	Trevor Peake
MF	7	Dave Bennett
MF	8	David Speedie
FW	9	Cyrille Regis	(substituted off) 70'
FW	10	Lloyd McGrath
MF	11	David Smith
Substitute used:
FW	12	Keith Houchen	(substituted on) 70'
Manager:
John Sillett

== Post-match ==
The Sutton United manager Williams suggested that "the enormity of this result will reverberate throughout the whole of soccer". He also said that he was pleased with the manner of the victory: "I am delighted that we won by playing good football". The Sutton captain Rains was proud of how his side played: "We kept playing to the end ... To be frank, I expected a little bit more from Coventry." He also reflected on the differences in preparations both sides had made before the match, noting "while Coventry's players were away from their families for most of the week, we've been doing our jobs and leading normal lives". The Coventry manager John Sillett said "it's been a very hard day for my players. Sunday is going to be worse when they read the papers and realise they have made history, the wrong way round". He was, however, gracious in defeat, noting that "Sutton played good football and on the day we were second best".

Sutton's achievement attracted considerable attention in the British media. Paul Newman, writing in The Times, described it as "the most remarkable FA Cup result for 14 years" and "one of the greatest FA Cup giant-killing acts of all time". Lacey of The Guardian concurred and suggested that Sutton had "pulled off a victory fit to rank with the biggest giantkilling acts in the competition's history." Ronald Atkin, writing in The Observer, described the result as "distilled essence of Cup magic". Goalscorers Rains and Hanlan were guests on Terry Wogan's chat show the following Monday, Hanlan taking an afternoon off from his job as a self-employed bricklayer to appear on the show. He later revealed that much of his time in the subsequent weeks, up until Sutton's fourth-round game, was spent with media commitments.

Sutton United were drawn against Norwich City at Carrow Road in the fourth round, with the match to be played over the weekend of 28 January 1989. Norwich were considered by bookmakers to be among the favourites of the remaining teams in the competition to win the cup and were second in the First Division at the time, two points behind league leaders Arsenal. Williams had aspired to see his club drawn against a team above Coventry City in the league and suggested that "the fantasy continues" upon learning of Sutton's opposition. Sutton United were one of two non-League clubs to make it to the fourth round, with Kettering Town being the other after they defeated Halifax Town in a replay.

In front of Norwich's largest crowd of the season, including around 6,000 visiting supporters, Sutton United were defeated 8–0. Trevor Putney opened the scoring for the home side on 13 minutes before Malcolm Allen, a late replacement for injured striker Robert Rosario, doubled the lead two minutes later. Robert Fleck scored a 19-minute hat-trick and Allen scored three further goals to give Norwich the largest FA Cup victory in their club's history. Despite the magnitude of the defeat, the Sutton United players performed a lap of honour at the conclusion of the match. David Lacey, writing in The Guardian, noted that "as massacres go it was quite civilised" but that Norwich "could have had 16". Williams admitted that Norwich "play a different game to us. Their one-touch play completely destroyed us. We knew we had to contain them in midfield, but weren't able to." Dave Stringer, the Norwich manager, said "Sutton were a credit to the Vauxhall Conference but we were a credit to the First Division". Sutton's brief period in the limelight ended with the Norwich defeat; according to Hanlan, "the interview requests stopped. But that was OK – it was nice to get back to my normal life."

Coventry responded to the defeat with a run of three wins in five games in the league, culminating in a 1–0 victory over eventual champions Arsenal. That result took them to third place in the table and they were described by Brown as being "dark horses for the championship". A poor run of results followed, however, and they eventually finished seventh with just three wins in their final thirteen league games. Despite Sillett's assertion that the Sutton defeat had "done his players good", Coventry suffered another FA Cup upset in the following season's competition, when they were beaten in the third round by Third Division Northampton Town. Sutton United's 1988–89 season concluded with them twelfth in the Conference.

== Legacy ==
Sutton United were the last non-League team to beat a side from the top tier of English football until the fourth round of the 2012–13 FA Cup when Luton Town, who played in the Conference Premier, the fifth tier, won 1–0 against Norwich City. The Sutton chairman Bruce Elliot later described the occasion as "part of the club's tradition".

In 2011 ESPN described the result as a "memorable giant-killing" and the following year, ESPN viewers voted the match as one of the greatest ever in the FA Cup. Peter Webster writing in the Bleacher Report included it in a list of the "10 Most Infamous FA Cup Upsets". The match was listed in The Independent's "biggest FA Cup shocks in the history of the game", and Eurosport included it in their list of the 10 biggest upsets in the FA Cup. In 2021, Talksport described the result as not "just seen as the biggest shock in the history of the FA Cup but one of the biggest in any game ever".

== See also ==
Other famous upsets:

- United States v England (1950 FIFA World Cup)
- Berwick Rangers F.C. 1–0 Rangers F.C., 1967 Scottish Cup
- Hereford United 2–1 Newcastle United, 1972 FA Cup
