= 1988–89 FA Cup =

Tournament details
- Country: England; Wales

Final positions
- Champions: Liverpool (4th title)
- Runners-up: Everton

Tournament statistics
- Top goal scorer: John Aldridge (6)

The 1988–89 FA Cup was the 108th season of the world's oldest football knockout competition, the Football Association Challenge Cup, or FA Cup for short. Liverpool defeated Everton 3–2 in the final.

== Qualifying rounds ==
Most participating clubs that were not members of the Football League competed in the qualifying rounds to secure one of 28 places available in the first round.

The winners from the fourth qualifying round were Frickley Athletic, Southport, Barrow, Runcorn, Brandon United, Guisborough Town, Northwich Victoria, Altrincham, Halesowen Town, Dagenham, Welling United, Grays Athletic, Bromsgrove Rovers, Aylesbury United, Hayes, Woking, Stafford Rangers, Kettering Town, Hendon, Yeovil Town, Dartford, Waterlooville, Merthyr Tydfil, Sutton United, Fareham Town, Bognor Regis Town, Fisher Athletic and Newport County.

Guisborough Town was the only qualifying club appearing in the competition proper for the first time. Of the others, Brandon United had last featured at this stage in 1979–80, Barrow had last done so in 1976–77 and Grays Athletic had last done so in 1952–53.

Already experiencing acute financial difficulties when they were relegated from the Football League at the end of the previous season, Newport County was unable to recover in their first season of non-league competition since 1919–20. Defeated by eventual Football Conference champions Maidstone United in the first round of the FA Cup, County was wound up and disbanded in February 1989 with their final league record being expunged.

== First round proper ==
The 48 teams from the Football League Third and Fourth Divisions entered in this round along with the 28 non-league clubs from the qualifying rounds and Enfield, Telford United, Maidstone United and Bath City who were given byes. The first round of games were played over the weekend 19–20 November 1988, with most replays being played on 22–23 November. All other replays were played on 28 November. Brandon United and Guisborough Town, from the Northern League at Step 8 of English football, were the lowest-ranked teams in the round.

Tie no	Home team	Score	Away team	Date
1	Enfield (5)	1–1	Leyton Orient	19 November 1988
Replay	Leyton Orient	2–2	Enfield	23 November 1988
Replay	Leyton Orient	0–1	Enfield	28 November 1988
2	Blackpool	2–1	Scunthorpe United	19 November 1988
3	Darlington	1–2	Notts County	19 November 1988
4	Bath City (6)	2–0	Grays Athletic (6)	19 November 1988
5	Bristol City	3–1	Southend United	19 November 1988
6	Burnley	0–2	Chester City	19 November 1988
7	Preston North End	1–1	Tranmere Rovers	19 November 1988
Replay	Tranmere Rovers	3–0	Preston North End	22 November 1988
8	Yeovil Town (5)	3–2	Merthyr Tydfil (6)	19 November 1988
9	Reading	4–2	Hendon (6)	19 November 1988
10	Woking (7)	1–4	Cambridge United	19 November 1988
11	Gillingham	3–3	Peterborough United	19 November 1988
Replay	Peterborough United	1–0	Gillingham	23 November 1988
12	Bolton Wanderers	0–0	Chesterfield	19 November 1988
Replay	Chesterfield	2–3	Bolton Wanderers	28 November 1988
13	Grimsby Town	1–0	Wolverhampton Wanderers	19 November 1988
14	Stafford Rangers (5)	2–2	Crewe Alexandra	19 November 1988
Replay	Crewe Alexandra	3–2	Stafford Rangers	22 November 1988
15	Scarborough	2–1	Stockport County	19 November 1988
16	Doncaster Rovers	0–0	Brandon United (8)	19 November 1988
Replay	Doncaster Rovers	2–1	Brandon United	22 November 1988
17	Fulham	0–1	Colchester United	19 November 1988
18	Brentford	2–0	Halesowen Town (7)	19 November 1988
19	Bristol Rovers	3–0	Fisher Athletic (5)	20 November 1988
20	Altrincham (5)	3–2	Lincoln City	19 November 1988
21	Bognor Regis Town (6)	2–1	Exeter City	19 November 1988
22	Huddersfield Town	1–1	Rochdale	19 November 1988
Replay	Rochdale	3–4	Huddersfield Town	28 November 1988
23	Mansfield Town	1–1	Sheffield United	19 November 1988
Replay	Sheffield United	2–1	Mansfield Town	22 November 1988
24	Cardiff City	3–0	Hereford United	19 November 1988
25	Halifax Town	1–0	York City	19 November 1988
26	Newport County (5)	1–2	Maidstone United (5)	19 November 1988
27	Southport (6)	0–2	Port Vale	19 November 1988
28	Runcorn (5)	2–2	Wrexham	19 November 1988
Replay	Wrexham	2–3	Runcorn	22 November 1988
29	Torquay United	2–2	Fareham Town (6)	19 November 1988
Replay	Fareham Town	2–3	Torquay United	23 November 1988
30	Kettering Town (5)	2–1	Dartford (6)	19 November 1988
31	Rotherham United	3–1	Barrow (6)	19 November 1988
32	Aldershot	1–0	Hayes (6)	19 November 1988
33	Dagenham (6)	0–4	Sutton United (5)	19 November 1988
34	Waterlooville (6)	1–4	Aylesbury United (5)	19 November 1988
35	Telford United (5)	1–1	Carlisle United	19 November 1988
Replay	Carlisle United	4–1	Telford United	22 November 1988
36	Swansea City	3–1	Northampton Town	19 November 1988
37	Frickley Athletic (6)	0–2	Northwich Victoria (5)	19 November 1988
38	Hartlepool United	2–0	Wigan Athletic	19 November 1988
39	Welling United (5)	3–0	Bromsgrove Rovers (6)	19 November 1988
40	Guisborough Town (8)	0–1	Bury	19 November 1988

== Second round proper ==
The second round of games were played over 10–11 December 1988, with the first round of replays being played on 13–14 December. The Aldershot-Bristol City game went to two more replays. Step 6 sides Bath City, from the Southern League Premier Division, and Bognor Regis Town, from the Isthmian League Premier Division, were the lowest-ranked teams in the round.

Tie no	Home team	Score	Away team	Date
1	Enfield (5)	1–4	Cardiff City	11 December 1988
2	Blackpool	3–0	Bury	10 December 1988
3	Bath City (6)	0–0	Welling United (5)	10 December 1988
Replay	Welling United	3–2	Bath City	14 December 1988
4	Yeovil Town (5)	1–1	Torquay United	10 December 1988
Replay	Torquay United	1–0	Yeovil Town	14 December 1988
5	Reading	1–1	Maidstone United (5)	10 December 1988
Replay	Maidstone United	1–2	Reading	14 December 1988
6	Bolton Wanderers	1–2	Port Vale	10 December 1988
7	Grimsby Town	3–2	Rotherham United	10 December 1988
8	Northwich Victoria (5)	1–2	Tranmere Rovers	10 December 1988
9	Scarborough	0–1	Carlisle United	10 December 1988
10	Doncaster Rovers	1–3	Sheffield United	11 December 1988
11	Aylesbury United (5)	0–1	Sutton United (5)	10 December 1988
12	Altrincham (5)	0–3	Halifax Town	10 December 1988
13	Bognor Regis Town (6)	0–1	Cambridge United	10 December 1988
14	Huddersfield Town	1–0	Chester City	10 December 1988
15	Runcorn (5)	0–3	Crewe Alexandra	10 December 1988
16	Kettering Town (5)	2–1	Bristol Rovers	10 December 1988
17	Aldershot	1–1	Bristol City	10 December 1988
Replay	Bristol City	0–0	Aldershot	13 December 1988
Replay	Aldershot	2–2	Bristol City	20 December 1988
Replay	Bristol City	1–0	Aldershot	22 December 1988
18	Peterborough United	0–0	Brentford	10 December 1988
Replay	Brentford	3–2	Peterborough United	14 December 1988
19	Colchester United	2–2	Swansea City	10 December 1988
Replay	Swansea City	1–3	Colchester United	13 December 1988
20	Hartlepool United	1–0	Notts County	10 December 1988

== Third round proper ==
Teams from the Football League First and Second Divisions entered in this round. The third round of games in the FA Cup were played over the weekend 7–8 January 1989, with the first set of replays being played on 10–11 January. Two games went to second replays, and one to a third replay. The round featured three clubs from the Football Conference at Step 5 of English football: Welling United, Sutton United and Kettering Town.

Tie no	Home team	Score	Away team	Date
1	Blackpool (3)	0–1	AFC Bournemouth (2)	7 January 1989
2	Sutton United (5)	2–1	Coventry City (1)	7 January 1989
3	Walsall (2)	1–1	Brentford (3)	7 January 1989
Replay	Brentford	1–0	Walsall	10 January 1989
4	Nottingham Forest (1)	3–0	Ipswich Town (2)	7 January 1989
5	Sheffield Wednesday (1)	5–1	Torquay United (4)	7 January 1989
6	Crewe Alexandra (4)	2–3	Aston Villa (1)	7 January 1989
7	Middlesbrough (1)	1–2	Grimsby Town (4)	7 January 1989
8	West Bromwich Albion (2)	1–1	Everton (1)	7 January 1989
Replay	Everton	1–0	West Bromwich Albion	11 January 1989
9	Sunderland (2)	1–1	Oxford United (2)	7 January 1989
Replay	Oxford United	2–0	Sunderland	11 January 1989
10	Derby County (1)	1–1	Southampton (1)	7 January 1989
Replay	Southampton	1–2	Derby County	10 January 1989
11	Shrewsbury Town (2)	0–3	Colchester United (4)	7 January 1989
12	Tranmere Rovers (4)	1–1	Reading (3)	7 January 1989
Replay	Reading	2–1	Tranmere Rovers	11 January 1989
13	Newcastle United (1)	0–0	Watford (2)	7 January 1989
Replay	Watford	2–2	Newcastle United	10 January 1989
Replay	Newcastle United	0–0	Watford	16 January 1989
Replay	Watford	1–0	Newcastle United	18 January 1989
14	Manchester City (2)	1–0	Leicester City (2)	7 January 1989
15	Barnsley (2)	4–0	Chelsea (2)	7 January 1989
16	Portsmouth (2)	1–1	Swindon Town (2)	7 January 1989
Replay	Swindon Town	2–0	Portsmouth	10 January 1989
17	West Ham United (1)	2–2	Arsenal (1)	8 January 1989
Replay	Arsenal	0–1	West Ham United	11 January 1989
18	Brighton & Hove Albion (2)	1–2	Leeds United (2)	7 January 1989
19	Manchester United (1)	0–0	Queens Park Rangers (1)	7 January 1989
Replay	Queens Park Rangers	2–2	Manchester United	11 January 1989
Replay	Manchester United	3–0	Queens Park Rangers	23 January 1989
20	Plymouth Argyle (2)	2–0	Cambridge United (4)	7 January 1989
21	Bradford City (2)	1–0	Tottenham Hotspur (1)	7 January 1989
22	Millwall (1)	3–2	Luton Town (1)	7 January 1989
23	Carlisle United (4)	0–3	Liverpool (1)	7 January 1989
24	Huddersfield Town (3)	0–1	Sheffield United (3)	7 January 1989
25	Cardiff City (3)	1–2	Hull City (2)	7 January 1989
26	Port Vale (3)	1–3	Norwich City (1)	8 January 1989
27	Charlton Athletic (1)	2–1	Oldham Athletic (2)	7 January 1989
28	Kettering Town (5)	1–1	Halifax Town (4)	7 January 1989
Replay	Halifax Town	2–3	Kettering Town	10 January 1989
29	Stoke City (2)	1–0	Crystal Palace (2)	7 January 1989
30	Birmingham City (2)	0–1	Wimbledon (1)	7 January 1989
31	Hartlepool United (4)	1–0	Bristol City (3)	7 January 1989
32	Welling United (5)	0–1	Blackburn Rovers (2)	7 January 1989

== Fourth round proper ==
The fourth round of games were played over the weekend 28–29 January 1989, with replays being played on 31 January – 1 February. Sutton United and Kettering Town were again the lowest-ranked teams in the round, and they were also the last non-league clubs left in the competition.

Tie no	Home team	Score	Away team	Date
1	Watford	2–1	Derby County	28 January 1989
2	Nottingham Forest	2–0	Leeds United	28 January 1989
3	Blackburn Rovers	2–1	Sheffield Wednesday	28 January 1989
4	Aston Villa	0–1	Wimbledon	28 January 1989
5	Grimsby Town	1–1	Reading	28 January 1989
Replay	Reading	1–2	Grimsby Town	1 February 1989
6	Swindon Town	0–0	West Ham United	28 January 1989
Replay	West Ham United	1–0	Swindon Town	1 February 1989
7	Sheffield United	3–3	Colchester United	28 January 1989
Replay	Colchester United	0–2	Sheffield United	31 January 1989
8	Brentford	3–1	Manchester City	28 January 1989
9	Manchester United	4–0	Oxford United	28 January 1989
10	Norwich City	8–0	Sutton United (5)	28 January 1989
11	Plymouth Argyle	1–1	Everton	28 January 1989
Replay	Everton	4–0	Plymouth Argyle	31 January 1989
12	Bradford City	1–2	Hull City	28 January 1989
13	Millwall	0–2	Liverpool	29 January 1989
14	Charlton Athletic	2–1	Kettering Town (5)	28 January 1989
15	Stoke City	3–3	Barnsley	28 January 1989
Replay	Barnsley	2–1	Stoke City	31 January 1989
16	Hartlepool United	1–1	AFC Bournemouth	28 January 1989
Replay	AFC Bournemouth	5–2	Hartlepool United	31 January 1989

== Fifth round proper ==
The fifth set of games were played over the weekend 18–19 February 1989, with replay being played on 22 February. Fourth Division side Grimsby Town was the lowest-ranked team in the draw.

Tie no	Home team	Score	Away team	Date
1	AFC Bournemouth	1–1	Manchester United	18 February 1989
Replay	Manchester United	1–0	AFC Bournemouth	22 February 1989
2	Watford	0–3	Nottingham Forest	19 February 1989
3	Blackburn Rovers	0–2	Brentford	18 February 1989
4	Barnsley	0–1	Everton	18 February 1989
5	Norwich City	3–2	Sheffield United	18 February 1989
6	Hull City	2–3	Liverpool	18 February 1989
7	Wimbledon	3–1	Grimsby Town	18 February 1989
8	Charlton Athletic	0–1	West Ham United	18 February 1989

== Sixth round proper ==
Most of the sixth round of FA Cup games were played over the weekend 18–19 March 1989, with a replay on 22 March.

Third Division Brentford was the last club from the First Round left in the competition, but their impressive cup run was ended by a 4–0 defeat at Liverpool, who were chasing the double.

Wimbledon's defence of the trophy ended with a 1–0 defeat at Everton.

West Ham United, struggling in the league but thriving in the cup competitions (as League Cup semi-finalists), surrendered their chances of FA Cup glory with a 3–1 replay defeat to Norwich City following a goalless draw in the first game.

Nottingham Forest kept their outside chances of a domestic treble by winning 1–0 against Manchester United, who lost their own last chance of silverware in a season in which they had failed to feature in the title race.

18 March 1989

Liverpool	4–0	Brentford
McMahon 15'; Barnes 62'; Beardsley 79', 82'

Anfield Stadium, Liverpool
18 March 1989

Manchester United	0–1	Nottingham Forest
		Parker 42'

Old Trafford, Manchester
18 March 1989

West Ham United	0–0	Norwich City

Upton Park, London
19 March 1989

Everton	1–0	Wimbledon
McCall 55'

Goodison Park, Liverpool

=== Replay ===
22 March 1989

Norwich City	3–1	West Ham United
Allen 25', 27'; Gordon 86'		Ince 75'

Carrow Road, Norwich

== Semi-finals ==
The FA Cup semi-finals were scheduled for 15 April 1989 and this was the last year that both games were scheduled to be held simultaneously on a Saturday afternoon with a 3pm kick off. The Everton–Norwich City game was completed as expected, but the Liverpool–Nottingham Forest game was abandoned after six minutes due to the Hillsborough Disaster. The disaster caused 94 deaths on 15 April 1989 (the final death toll was 97). There was speculation that the competition for this season would be abandoned, but on 30 April, it was confirmed that both teams would continue in the competition and play in a rescheduled semi-final, which was played on 7 May and won 3–1 by Liverpool.

Norwich's hopes of a first-ever FA Cup final were ended as Everton beat them 1–0 to book the second all-Merseyside FA Cup final in four seasons.

15 April 1989
15:00 BST

Everton	1–0	Norwich City
Nevin 26'	Report

Villa Park, Birmingham
Attendance: 46,553
Referee: George Courtney

15 April 1989
15:00 BST

Liverpool	0–0 (Match abandoned)	Nottingham Forest

Hillsborough Stadium, Sheffield
Attendance: 53,000
Referee: Ray Lewis

7 May 1989
13:00 BST

Liverpool	3–1	Nottingham Forest
Aldridge 3', 58'; Laws 72' (o.g.)	Report	Webb 33'

Old Trafford, Manchester
Attendance: 38,000
Referee: Ray Lewis
- Due to the exceptional circumstances surrounding the rearranged tie, the then normal competition rules of the match requiring a replay if the match finished with scores level after extra time was rescinded, meaning the match would have been decided on the day by penalties if it had been necessary.

== Final ==
The second all-Merseyside FA Cup final in four seasons ended like the previous one, with Liverpool defeating Everton and Ian Rush scoring twice, although this time the scoreline was 3–2 rather than 3–1.

A fourth-minute goal from John Aldridge handed the initiative to Liverpool, but a late equaliser by substitute Stuart McCall forced extra-time. Another substitute Ian Rush restored Liverpool's lead five minutes into extra time, before McCall's second goal drew the scores level after 102 minutes. However, a second goal from Rush came just two minutes later, and the trophy went to Anfield.

As a tribute to the fans who had died in the Hillsborough disaster, both teams wore black armbands and observed a minute's silence prior to the match.

20 May 1989
15:00 BST

Liverpool	3–2 (a.e.t.)	Everton
Aldridge 4'; Rush 95', 104'	Report	McCall 89', 102'

Wembley Stadium, London
Attendance: 82,800
Referee: Joe Worrall

Liverpool	Everton

== Media coverage ==
The BBC had all rights to show FA Cup games. They were able to show one live game from Round 3 onwards as part of Match of the Day Live. They were also able to show highlights of games from Round 1 onwards on Match of the Day. These matches were.

Round	Live	Highlights
First round proper		Enfield v Leyton Orient; Southport v Port Vale
Second round proper		Kettering Town v Bristol Rovers; Altrincham v Halifax Town
Third round proper	West Ham United v Arsenal	Sutton United v Coventry City; Bradford City v Tottenham Hotspur; West Bromwich Albion v Everton; Port Vale v Norwich City; Manchester United v Queen's Park Rangers (Replay)
Fourth round proper	Millwall v Liverpool	Norwich City v Sutton United; Charlton Athletic v Kettering Town; Aston Villa v Wimbledon; Plymouth Argyle v Everton
Fifth round proper	Watford v Nottingham Forest	Hull City v Liverpool; Barnsley v Everton; AFC Bournemouth v Manchester United; Wimbledon v Grimsby Town; Norwich City v Sheffield United
Sixth round proper	Everton v Wimbledon	Manchester United v Nottingham Forest; Liverpool v Brentford; West Ham United v Norwich City
Semi-finals	Liverpool v Nottingham Forest	Everton v Norwich City
Final	Liverpool v Everton	

Match of the Day was due to show highlights of both FA Cup semi-finals, but this was cancelled due to the Hillsborough disaster with the entire programme reflecting on the tragic events. The rescheduled Liverpool vs Nottingham Forest match at Old Trafford was the first semi-final ever to be televised live and highlights of the other semi final between Everton and Norwich, which coincided with the Hillsborough disaster, were not shown until the build-up coverage on the day of the final.

== See also ==
- 1988–89 WFA Cup
