= 1988–89 Football Conference =

Football Conference
- Season: 1988–89
- Champions: Maidstone United (2nd Football Conference title)
- Promoted to the Football League: Maidstone United
- Conference League Cup winners: Yeovil Town
- FA Trophy winners: Telford United
- Relegated to Level 6/Folded: Weymouth, Newport County
- Matches: 420
- Goals: 1,236 (2.94 per match)
- Top goalscorer: Steve Butler (Maidstone United), 26; Mark Gall (Maidstone United), 26
- Biggest home win: Maidstone United – Altrincham 7–2 (27 August 1988); Wycombe Wanderers – Stafford Rangers 6–1 (11 February 1989); Boston United – Barnet 5–0 (29 October 1988); Maidstone United – Yeovil Town 5–0 (22 October 1988); Runcorn – Aylesbury 5–0 (3 December 1988); Welling United – Aylesbury 5–0 (12 October 1988)
- Biggest away win: Boston United – Runcorn 0–6 (28 September 1988)
- Highest scoring: Maidstone United – Altrincham 7–2 (27 August 1988); Kidderminster Harriers – Maidstone United 3–6 (8 April 1989)
- Longest winning run: Boston United, Chorley, Maidstone, Runcorn, 6 matches
- Longest unbeaten run: Maidstone, 17 matches
- Longest losing run: Fisher Athletic, 6 matches
- Highest attendance: Wycombe Wanderers v Kettering Town, 4,890 (8 April 1989)
- Lowest attendance: ?
- Average attendance: 1195 (– 4% compared to previous season)

The Football Conference season of 1988–89 (known as the GM Vauxhall Conference for sponsorship reasons) was the tenth season of the Football Conference.

It was the third season that the champions of the Conference were automatically promoted to the Football League after the abolition of the election system.

== Overview ==
Maidstone United, who had been Conference champions once earlier in the decade and once the runners-up, were finally promoted to the Football League Fourth Division after gaining their second title at this level.

Newport County, the club newly relegated to the Conference from the Football League, were wound up due to debts on 27 February 1989. They were then expelled from the Conference for failing to fulfil their fixtures; their record was expunged.

== New teams in the league this season ==
- Aylesbury United (promoted 1987–88)
- Chorley (promoted 1987–88)
- Newport County (relegated from the Football League 1987–88)
- Yeovil Town (promoted 1987–88)

== Final league table ==
Pos	Team	Pld	W	D	L	GF	GA	GD	Pts	Promotion or relegation
1	Maidstone United (C, P)	40	25	9	6	92	46	+46	84	Promotion to the Football League Fourth Division
2	Kettering Town	40	23	7	10	56	39	+17	76	
3	Boston United	40	22	8	10	61	51	+10	74	
4	Wycombe Wanderers	40	20	11	9	68	52	+16	71	
5	Kidderminster Harriers	40	21	6	13	68	57	+11	69	
6	Runcorn	40	19	8	13	77	53	+24	65	
7	Macclesfield Town	40	17	10	13	63	57	+6	61	
8	Barnet	40	18	7	15	64	69	−5	61	
9	Yeovil Town	40	15	11	14	68	67	+1	56	
10	Northwich Victoria	40	14	11	15	64	65	−1	53	
11	Welling United	40	14	11	15	45	46	−1	53	
12	Sutton United	40	12	15	13	64	54	+10	51	
13	Enfield	40	14	8	18	62	67	−5	50	
14	Altrincham	40	13	10	17	51	61	−10	49	
15	Cheltenham Town	40	12	12	16	55	58	−3	48	
16	Telford United	40	13	9	18	37	43	−6	48	
17	Chorley	40	13	6	21	57	71	−14	45	
18	Fisher Athletic	40	10	11	19	55	65	−10	41	
19	Stafford Rangers	40	11	7	22	49	74	−25	40	
20	Aylesbury United (R)	40	9	9	22	43	71	−28	36	Relegation to the Isthmian League Premier Division
21	Weymouth (R)	40	7	10	23	37	70	−33	31	Relegation to the Southern League Premier Division
22	Newport County	0	0	0	0	0	0	0	0	Club expelled and folded (Note: Newport County were expelled from the Football Conference on 27 February 1989, with their record (P29 W4 D7 L18 GF31 GA62 Pts19) being expunged.)

(C) Champions; (P) Promoted; (R) Relegated

== Results ==
Home \ Away	ALT	AYL	BAR	BOS	CHL	CHO	ENF	FIS	KET	KID	MAC	MDS	NOR	RUN	STA	SUT	TEL	WEL	WEY	WYC	YEO
Altrincham		1–0	1–1	0–0	0–1	1–2	0–0	1–1	1–2	3–1	1–3	0–1	2–2	1–2	2–1	1–0	0–0	3–1	2–1	2–2	2–2
Aylesbury United	1–2		1–3	1–2	0–0	4–3	2–1	1–1	0–1	1–5	1–2	1–2	2–0	1–2	1–1	1–0	2–0	0–0	4–1	0–2	3–2
Barnet	3–0	1–0		0–0	3–1	2–4	2–1	2–3	3–2	0–2	1–4	2–1	2–0	3–2	1–2	1–1	1–3	2–3	4–1	1–0	2–0
Boston United	3–1	2–0	5–0		1–1	2–0	3–2	2–4	1–1	0–2	3–2	1–4	2–1	0–6	2–1	3–1	1–0	2–0	2–0	0–1	1–1
Cheltenham Town	2–1	0–0	1–2	3–1		2–2	3–2	2–2	2–1	4–1	3–0	0–4	2–2	2–1	1–2	2–3	0–1	1–1	1–1	0–1	1–1
Chorley	1–0	1–1	2–3	0–1	1–4		1–2	1–1	0–1	1–3	0–1	1–3	3–1	1–3	3–1	2–1	2–0	1–1	0–0	3–2	2–3
Enfield	2–1	2–1	4–0	1–2	3–4	1–2		2–1	1–1	1–3	2–1	1–1	1–2	0–3	4–2	1–1	0–1	0–1	3–0	3–4	1–1
Fisher Athletic	1–1	0–2	1–2	1–3	2–0	4–0	1–2		3–0	2–0	2–2	0–2	2–4	0–1	0–1	1–1	0–1	1–3	3–2	3–3	4–2
Kettering Town	0–1	5–2	3–1	1–2	2–0	3–0	0–1	2–1		2–1	1–0	3–3	2–1	2–0	1–0	1–0	1–0	2–1	1–0	2–1	1–0
Kidderminster Harriers	2–3	4–3	1–0	0–2	3–2	0–2	1–3	2–1	1–1		0–1	3–6	1–1	2–1	3–2	1–0	1–1	2–1	1–0	2–0	2–2
Macclesfield Town	1–0	3–1	1–1	0–1	0–0	3–2	1–1	2–2	0–1	1–1		4–3	0–2	3–2	2–1	1–3	2–1	3–0	2–0	0–1	2–3
Maidstone United	7–2	1–1	3–2	3–0	2–0	2–0	3–1	1–0	0–0	0–3	3–3		4–1	2–2	3–0	1–1	1–3	3–0	3–0	1–3	5–0
Northwich Victoria	4–3	1–1	1–1	0–1	1–0	0–4	2–2	3–0	1–1	2–4	3–2	2–0		0–1	1–1	4–2	1–0	0–2	2–0	2–3	1–2
Runcorn	3–0	5–0	3–0	1–2	2–1	3–0	1–2	1–1	2–1	1–3	2–2	0–1	3–1		4–1	2–1	0–0	1–2	1–0	2–3	2–1
Stafford Rangers	0–2	3–1	1–2	4–1	1–1	3–2	3–1	0–1	2–1	0–1	1–1	0–2	0–1	0–4		1–1	1–3	3–0	1–0	1–1	2–6
Sutton United	3–2	5–2	5–1	0–0	1–1	1–2	3–1	2–1	0–2	1–1	1–2	1–1	3–3	3–1	2–0		1–2	0–1	3–1	3–0	5–2
Telford United	0–1	0–1	0–3	0–1	2–0	2–1	3–0	1–1	0–1	1–0	1–3	1–2	1–4	1–1	2–2	0–0		0–0	1–0	1–2	0–1
Welling United	0–0	5–0	1–1	3–2	0–2	1–0	0–0	3–1	2–1	0–1	2–0	0–0	0–0	4–0	1–3	1–1	0–1		4–0	0–1	0–2
Weymouth	1–3	0–0	1–1	2–2	3–2	2–3	2–3	1–0	3–0	3–1	1–2	1–3	2–2	1–1	1–0	2–2	0–0	1–0		0–3	0–2
Wycombe Wanderers	2–1	1–0	2–3	2–1	1–0	1–1	3–2	3–0	0–1	1–0	1–1	2–3	1–4	3–3	6–1	2–2	1–0	1–1	0–0		1–1
Yeovil Town	2–3	1–0	2–1	1–1	1–3	2–1	1–2	1–2	2–2	1–3	2–0	1–2	2–1	2–2	2–0	0–0	4–3	4–0	2–3	1–1	

Updated to match(es) played on unknown. Source: Jack Rollin (ed.), Rothmans Football Yearbook 1989–80. Queen Anne Press, Macdonald Futura Publishers, London & Sydney, 1989.
Legend: Blue = home team win; Yellow = draw; Red = away team win.
Locations of the Football Conference teams 1987–1988
Locations of the Football Conference teams 1988–1989

== Top scorers ==
Rank	Player	Club	League	FA Cup	FA Trophy	League Cup	Total
1	(England) Steve Butler	Maidstone United	26	0	0	1	27
=	(England) Mark Gall	Maidstone United	26	2	0	1	29
3	(England) Chris Camden	Stafford Rangers	23	9	0	2	34
=	(England) Mark Carter	Runcorn	23	0	0	1	24
5	(Saint Lucia) Ken Charlery	Maidstone United	22	4	0	0	26
6	(Scotland) Steve Burr	Macclesfield Town	21	0	5	0	26
=	(England) Don Page	Runcorn	21	1	0	3	25
8	(England) Paul Davies	Kidderminster Harriers	20	1	0	4	25
=	(Jamaica) Lenny Dennis	Sutton United	20	3	1	5	29
=	(England) Mark West	Wycombe Wanderers	20	4	2	0	26
11	(England) Ronnie Ellis	Altrincham	18	2	0	0	20
=	(England) Derrick Parker	Northwich Victoria	18	2	2	0	22
13	(England) Phil Power	Chorley	16	1	0	0	17
=	(England) Guy Whittingham	Yeovil Town	16	0	0	0	16
15	(England) Chris Cook	Boston United	15	6	1	1	23
=	(England) Dean Neal	Fisher Athletic	15	6	0	0	21
=	(England) Paul Wilson	Boston United	15	5	1	0	21
18	(Scotland) Frank Murphy	Barnet	14	2	0	2	18
=	(England) Malcolm O'Connor	Northwich Victoria	14	6	1	1	22
20	(England) Gary Abbott	Enfield	13	4	1	0	18
=	(England) Phil Derbyshire	Macclesfield Town	13	0	0	0	13
=	(England) Ernie Moss	Kettering Town	13	1	3	0	17

== Promotion and relegation ==
=== Promoted ===
- Maidstone United (to the Football League Fourth Division)
- Barrow (from the Northern Premier League)
- Farnborough Town (from the Isthmian League)
- Merthyr Tydfil (from the Southern League)

=== Relegated ===
- Aylesbury (to the Isthmian League)
- Darlington (from the Football League Fourth Division)
- Weymouth (to the Southern League)
