= Barrie Williams =

Welsh football manager

Personal information
- Full name: Barrie Williams
- Date of birth: 23 September 1937
- Place of birth: Carmarthen, Wales
- Date of death: 23 April 2018 (aged 80)
- Place of death: Spain

Managerial career
- Years: Team
- 1977–1979: Sutton United (assistant)
- 1979–1989: Sutton United
- 1991: England Women
- 1992–1993: Hendon

Barrie Williams (23 September 1937 – 23 April 2018) was a Welsh football coach. He managed Sutton United during the 1980s and the England women's team during 1991. In January 1989, Williams led Sutton United, of the Football Conference, to a notable FA Cup win over First Division side Coventry City. A teacher of English Literature by profession, Williams was known for quoting Shakespeare and Kipling, as well as smoking a pipe. Williams took charge of Hendon for their 1992–93 Isthmian League campaign.

Williams later emigrated to Spain, where he died on 23 April 2018, aged 80.
