= 1992–93 Football Conference =

Football Conference
- Season: 1992–93
- Champions: Wycombe Wanderers (1st Football Conference title)
- Promoted to the Football League: Wycombe Wanderers
- Conference League Cup winners: Northwich Victoria
- FA Trophy winners: Wycombe Wanderers
- Relegated to Level 6: Boston United, Farnborough Town
- Matches: 462
- Goals: 1,291 (2.79 per match)
- Top goalscorer: David Leworthy (Farnborough Town), 32
- Biggest home win: Dagenham & Redbridge – Merthyr Tydfil 6–1 (6 April 1993); Farnborough Town – Gateshead 6–1 (22 August 1992); Kettering Town – Slough Town 5–0 (3 November 1992); Telford United – Merthyr Tydfil 5–0 (12 Aor 1993); Welling United – Merthyr Tydfil 5–0 (21 November 1992)
- Biggest away win: Stalybridge Celtic – Northwich Victoria 0–6 (2 January 1993)
- Highest scoring: Telford United – Farnborough Town 6–3 (12 September 1992)
- Longest winning run: Wycombe Wanderers, 9 matches
- Longest unbeaten run: Wycombe Wanderers, 10 matches
- Longest losing run: Northwich Victoria, Telford United, 6 matches
- Highest attendance: Wycombe Wanderers v Slough Town, 7,230 (23 March 1993)
- Lowest attendance: ?
- Average attendance: 1,229 (+ 1% compared to previous season)

The GM Vauxhall Conference season of 1992–93 was the fourteenth season of the Football Conference.

== Overview ==
Wycombe Wanderers, runners-up a year earlier, finally gained the Conference title – and a place in the Football League at the expense of the bottom placed Third Division club Halifax Town.

== New teams in the league this season ==
- Bromsgrove Rovers (promoted 1991–92)
- Stalybridge Celtic (promoted 1991–92)
- Woking (promoted 1991–92)
- Dagenham & Redbridge inherited Redbridge Forest's place after the latter's merger with Dagenham

== Final league table ==
Pos	Team	Pld	W	D	L	GF	GA	GD	Pts	Promotion or relegation
1	Wycombe Wanderers (C, P)	42	24	11	7	84	37	+47	83	Promotion to the Football League Third Division
2	Bromsgrove Rovers	42	18	14	10	67	49	+18	68	
3	Dagenham & Redbridge	42	19	11	12	75	47	+28	67 (Note: Dagenham & Redbridge were deducted 1 point.)	
4	Yeovil Town	42	18	12	12	59	49	+10	66	
5	Slough Town	42	18	11	13	60	55	+5	65	
6	Stafford Rangers	42	18	10	14	55	47	+8	64	
7	Bath City	42	15	14	13	53	46	+7	59	
8	Woking	42	17	8	17	58	62	−4	59	
9	Kidderminster Harriers	42	14	16	12	60	60	0	58	
10	Altrincham	42	15	13	14	49	52	−3	58	
11	Northwich Victoria	42	16	8	18	68	55	+13	56	
12	Stalybridge Celtic	42	13	17	12	48	55	−7	56	
13	Kettering Town	42	14	13	15	61	63	−2	55	
14	Gateshead	42	14	10	18	53	56	−3	52	
15	Telford United	42	14	10	18	55	60	−5	52	
16	Merthyr Tydfil	42	14	10	18	51	79	−28	52	
17	Witton Albion	42	11	17	14	62	65	−3	50	
18	Macclesfield Town	42	12	13	17	40	50	−10	49	
19	Runcorn	42	13	10	19	58	76	−18	49	
20	Welling United	42	12	12	18	57	72	−15	48	Reprived from relegation (Note: Welling United were reprived from relegation because Isthmian League champions Chesham United did not meet Conference ground requirements.)
21	Farnborough Town (R)	42	12	11	19	68	87	−19	47	Relegation to the Southern League Premier Division
22	Boston United (R)	42	9	13	20	50	69	−19	40	Relegation to the Northern Premier League Premier Division

(C) Champions; (P) Promoted; (R) Relegated

== Results ==
Home \ Away	ALT	BAT	BOS	BRO	D&R	FAR	GAT	KET	KID	MAC	MER	NOR	RUN	SLO	STA	STL	TEL	WEL	WTN	WOK	WYC	YEO
Altrincham		1–0	1–1	2–2	1–0	2–2	0–1	3–0	2–2	1–0	0–1	0–0	0–2	1–1	1–5	0–0	0–3	2–0	2–1	1–0	0–2	1–2
Bath City	3–0		2–1	0–3	2–1	5–2	1–1	0–0	2–1	0–0	1–3	0–5	1–1	0–1	2–1	1–1	4–1	1–1	0–0	2–0	2–0	0–0
Boston United	1–2	1–2		1–2	3–1	0–0	0–2	0–1	0–3	3–1	2–0	3–5	0–0	0–0	0–1	1–1	2–2	2–1	2–2	1–2	0–3	1–0
Bromsgrove Rovers	4–1	1–1	2–1		1–2	2–2	3–0	1–1	2–2	3–0	1–2	1–2	0–0	0–1	2–3	4–0	0–0	2–2	3–2	1–0	1–0	1–0
Dagenham & Redbridge	2–2	2–1	1–0	1–1		5–1	3–1	1–2	3–2	1–2	6–1	4–1	5–1	4–4	0–1	1–2	0–2	1–0	1–1	5–1	1–2	1–1
Farnborough Town	2–5	2–1	4–0	1–1	1–4		6–1	3–2	2–2	0–0	2–1	0–3	2–3	1–0	1–1	1–2	0–1	3–2	1–1	0–3	0–2	2–1
Gateshead	2–0	0–4	2–2	0–0	1–1	1–0		1–1	1–0	1–0	4–0	0–2	4–1	1–0	0–1	0–0	0–1	1–2	3–1	1–1	0–1	4–1
Kettering Town	1–1	0–1	3–3	3–2	0–0	2–1	2–0		1–2	1–0	1–3	2–1	3–3	5–0	2–0	2–0	1–1	2–4	2–1	0–1	0–4	3–0
Kidderminster Harriers	0–1	1–0	0–2	1–0	0–1	1–5	3–3	0–0		2–1	1–0	5–3	2–0	1–1	0–2	2–1	2–1	2–1	0–0	1–3	1–4	1–1
Macclesfield Town	1–1	1–0	2–1	0–2	1–1	1–2	1–0	1–0	1–1		0–1	1–2	1–1	1–2	4–1	1–0	1–1	1–1	1–0	1–1	1–1	1–1
Merthyr Tydfil	2–2	1–1	0–3	1–1	0–2	1–3	1–1	2–1	4–3	1–2		3–0	0–3	1–1	0–0	1–1	4–0	1–1	0–2	1–5	1–4	1–1
Northwich Victoria	1–2	3–1	3–3	0–1	1–1	3–0	0–0	2–2	0–1	1–3	1–2		3–2	0–1	1–2	1–3	1–0	1–1	1–3	1–0	0–0	0–1
Runcorn	0–1	1–3	1–2	2–1	1–0	1–4	4–2	2–2	0–0	1–2	2–3	0–1		0–3	0–2	2–1	3–1	3–0	4–4	2–3	2–1	1–0
Slough Town	1–4	1–1	3–0	1–3	2–0	3–1	1–0	3–0	3–1	2–1	2–1	0–4	1–1		2–1	2–3	2–0	4–2	2–3	0–1	1–1	3–0
Stafford Rangers	0–0	3–2	0–0	3–4	0–1	2–2	2–1	2–4	0–1	1–0	0–1	1–0	0–1	1–0		0–0	2–1	4–3	1–1	0–0	0–1	0–1
Stalybridge Celtic	1–0	1–1	2–1	0–1	0–3	2–0	2–1	0–0	2–2	2–1	2–2	0–6	0–0	0–0	1–0		3–3	0–0	1–2	3–0	2–2	1–1
Telford United	2–1	0–0	0–1	0–1	0–1	6–3	1–0	3–1	1–1	3–1	5–0	1–0	2–1	1–1	0–0	0–2		0–1	0–3	3–3	2–3	1–0
Welling United	2–0	0–3	2–2	4–2	0–2	3–1	2–1	1–1	0–0	1–0	5–0	1–5	3–2	2–1	1–2	1–4	1–3		2–2	1–1	2–2	0–3
Witton Albion	1–1	0–0	2–0	1–1	2–2	1–1	1–3	4–2	2–2	1–1	3–1	1–3	0–3	1–1	2–5	2–0	2–1	0–1		1–2	2–2	1–2
Woking	0–2	0–1	3–0	0–2	1–1	4–1	1–4	3–2	1–5	4–0	0–2	1–0	4–0	1–2	0–3	2–1	3–2	1–0	1–2		0–3	0–0
Wycombe Wanderers	0–2	2–0	3–3	4–0	1–0	1–1	2–1	1–2	1–1	0–1	4–0	1–0	5–1	1–0	2–2	4–0	4–0	3–0	2–1	0–0		5–1
Yeovil Town	1–0	2–1	2–1	2–2	0–3	5–2	1–3	2–1	2–2	1–1	0–1	1–1	4–0	5–1	2–0	1–1	1–0	1–0	2–0	4–1	3–0	

Updated to match(es) played on unknown. Source: Jack Rollin (ed.), Rothmans Football Yearbook 1993–94. Headline, 1993.
Legend: Blue = home team win; Yellow = draw; Red = away team win.
Locations of the Football Conference 1992–93 teams
Locations of the Football Conference teams 1992–1993

== Promotion and relegation ==
=== Promoted ===
- Wycombe Wanderers (to the Football League Third Division)
- Southport (from the Northern Premier League)
- Dover Athletic (from the Southern Premier League)

=== Relegated ===
- Halifax Town (from the Football League Third Division)
- Boston United (to the Northern Premier League)
- Farnborough Town (to the Southern Premier League)

== Top scorers in order of league goals ==
Rank	Player	Club	League	FA Cup	FA Trophy	League Cup	Total
1	(England) David Leworthy	Farnborough Town	32	1	5	1	39
2	(England) Mark Whitehouse	Bromsgrove Rovers	23	0	2	1	26
3	(England) Malcolm O'Connor	Northwich Victoria	21	2	1	3	27
4	(England) Keith Scott	Wycombe Wanderers	20	1	5	2	28
5	(England) Paul Cavell	Dagenham & Redbridge	19	8	1	1	29
=	(England) Terry Robbins	Welling United	19	1	2	1	23
=	(England) Andy Sayer	Slough Town	19	1	1	0	21
=	(England) Karl Thomas	Witton Albion	19	0	3	0	22
9	(England) Gary Abbott	Welling United	17	0	1	1	19
10	(England) Phil Brown	Kettering Town	16	2	0	0	18
=	(England) Gary Jones	Boston United	16	2	5	1	24
=	(England) Mickey Spencer	Yeovil Town	16	2	1	2	21
13	(England) Tony Hemmings	Northwich Victoria	15	1	0	4	20
=	(England) Alan Lamb	Gateshead	15	7	1	0	23
