= Paul McKinnon =

English footballer

Personal information
- Full name: Paul John McKinnon
- Date of birth: 1 August 1958 (age 68)
- Place of birth: Frimley, England
- Height: 6 ft 2 in (1.88 m)
- Position: Striker

Senior career*
Years	Team	Apps	(Gls)
1974–1977	Woking		
1977–1980	Sutton United		
1980	Malmö FF		
1980–1981	Sutton United		
1981	Malmö FF		
1982–1983	Sutton United		
1983	Trelleborgs FF		
1983–1986	Sutton United		
1986	Tegs SK		
1986	Sutton United		
1986–1987	Blackburn Rovers	5	(0)
1987	Örebro SK		
1987–1988	Sutton United		
1988	Örebro SK		
1988–1991	Sutton United		
1991–1993	Slough Town	75	(28)
- Sutton United
- * Club domestic league appearances and goals

Paul John McKinnon (born 1 August 1958) is an English former professional footballer who played as a striker.

== Career ==
Born in Frimley, Surrey, McKinnon started his career in non-league football with Woking before joining Sutton United in 1977. He later moved to Sweden where he represented Malmö FF in the Cup Winners' Cup and the UEFA Cup. McKinnon played briefly in the Football League for Blackburn Rovers, making five appearances during the 1986–87 season before returning to Sutton United. In 1991, he signed for Slough Town, scoring 36 goals in 98 appearances during his two seasons at the club. He then returned to Sutton for an eighth spell at the club. He is Sutton United's record goalscorer with 279 goals in 525 games.
