= Lennie Dennis =

Jamaican footballer (born 1964)

Personal information
- Date of birth: 13 November 1964 (age 61)
- Place of birth: Lewisham, England
- Position: Striker

Senior career*
Years	Team	Apps	(Gls)
- Sutton United
1989	Umeå FC		
1993–1995	Woking	40	(14)
1996–1997	Welling United	35	(21)
1997–1998	Kingstonian	34	(6)
1998–1999	Billericay Town		
Total		250+	(138+)

International career
1988	Jamaica	1	(0)
- * Club domestic league appearances and goals

Leonard Dennis (born 13 November 1964) is a Jamaican former international footballer who played semi-professionally in England and Sweden as a striker.

== Career ==
=== Club career ===
Dennis played club football for Sutton United (where he started in the famous FA Cup win over Coventry City), Welling United, Woking and Billericay Town. He also scored 6 goals in 34 appearances for Kingstonian.

During the 1989 season, Dennis played for Swedish football division 2 team Umeå FC. He scored seven goals for the club.

=== International career ===
Dennis made one international appearance for Jamaica in 1988, in a World Cup qualifier against the United States.

== After football ==
After retiring as a player, Dennis became a teacher at a number of different schools.
