= Terry Robbins (footballer) =

English footballer (born 1965)

Personal information
- Full name: Terence John Robbins
- Date of birth: 14 January 1965 (age 61)
- Place of birth: Southwark, England
- Height: 5 ft 5 in (1.65 m)
- Position: Forward

Senior career*
Years	Team	Apps	(Gls)
1982–1983	Gillingham	0	(0)
1983–1984	Maidstone United	5	(0)
1984–1986	Crawley Town	84	(60)
1986–1995	Welling United	320	(139)
1995–1996	Barnet	15	(2)
1996–1998	Boreham Wood	?	(?)
1998–1999	Bishop's Stortford	?	(?)
2002–2003	Enfield	?	(?)

International career
1992-1994 –	England semi-pro	6	(1)

Managerial career
- 1992-1995: Welling United (player-manager)
- 1998–1999: Bishop's Stortford (player-manager)
- * Club domestic league appearances and goals

Terence John "Terry" Robbins (born 14 January 1965) is an English former professional footballer who played in the Football League as a forward.
