= Sutton United F.C. =

English football club in London

Sutton United
- Full name: Sutton United Football Club
- Nicknames: The U’s; The Amber and Chocolates; The Yellows
- Founded: 5 March 1898; 128 years ago
- Ground: Gander Green Lane, Sutton
- Capacity: 7,032 (1,132 seated)
- Chairman: Bruce Elliott
- Manager: Chris Agutter
- League: National League
- 2025–26: National League, 19th of 24
- Website: suttonunited.net
Home colours	Away colours

Sutton United Football Club is a professional association football club from Sutton, South London, England. The team competes in the National League, the fifth level of the English football league system.

Sutton started out playing in junior, local leagues, but progressed into the Athenian League in 1921; the Isthmian League in 1964; and the Conference in 1986. The team was relegated back into the Isthmian League in 1991. Sutton won the Athenian League three times (1927–28, 1945–46 and 1957–58) and the Isthmian League five times (1966–67, 1984–85, 1985–86, 1998–99 and 2010–11). They appeared in the Conference for one more season in 1999–2000, and were founding members of the Conference South (now known as National League South) in 2004. Sutton won the National League South in 2015–16 and achieved promotion to the Football League after winning the National League title in the 2020–21 season.

The team has played at Wembley Stadium on four occasions. Firstly, in the FA Amateur Cup final twice, the FA Trophy final in 1980–81 and the EFL Trophy final in 2021–22. Sutton won the Anglo-Italian Cup in 1978–79, but the club is most famous for its FA Cup "giant killing" exploits, most notably in the 1988–89 season, when they defeated Coventry City 2–1 in the third round. Coventry City had won the competition in 1986–87 and had England forward Cyrille Regis up front. In the 2016–17 season Sutton reached the fifth round of the FA Cup for the first time in their history, beating three Football League teams (including Leeds United) before losing to Arsenal. They play home games at Gander Green Lane in Sutton about 11 miles south-southwest of central London.

== History ==
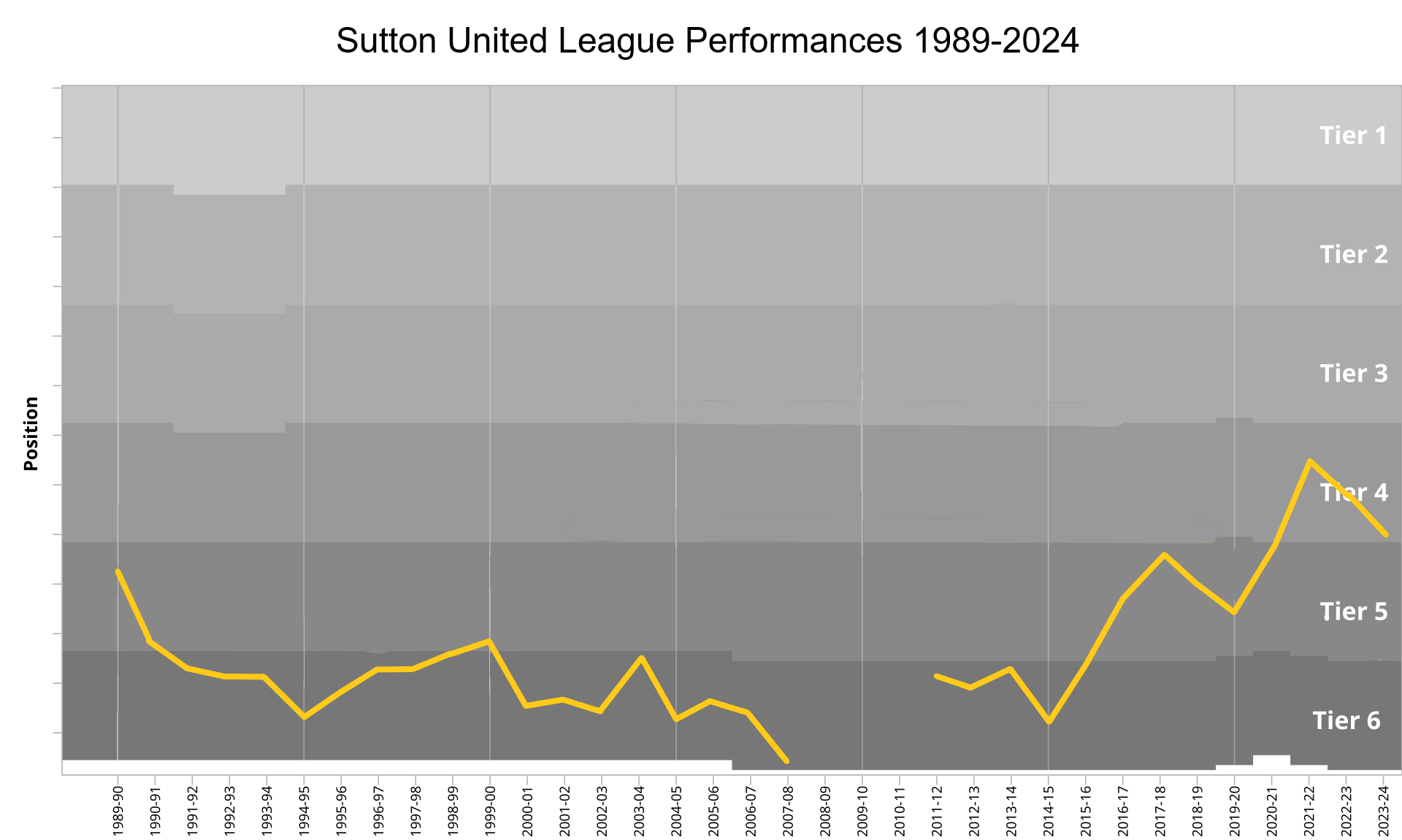
Chart of yearly table positions of Sutton United.

=== Formation and the early years ===
The club was formed on 5 March 1898 when Sutton Guild Rovers F.C. and Sutton Association F.C. (formerly Sutton St Barnabas F.C.) agreed to merge during a meeting at the Robin Hood Hotel.

The club gained a reputation locally in junior leagues, including the Clapham League, and in 1910 decided to become a senior side. They joined the Southern Suburban League and won it on their first attempt. During this period the team moved between several grounds, including what was then known as the Sutton Adult School Ground. After the First World War, the team moved in for good and have not left the stadium since.

=== Athenian League ===
Sutton gained election into the Athenian League in 1921. The team did not challenge at the top of the table and in 1926 finished last, but were re-elected. Only one seasons later, in 1928, the team won its first Athenian League Championship. The thirties were a good time for Sutton, who twice reached the semi-final of the FA Amateur Cup (in 1929 and 1937).

During the Second World War, Sutton kept playing football but on a smaller scale. The Athenian League had been suspended while this happened and so organised competitions were rare and sporadic, but Sutton won a number of honours. This put them in good stead for winning the league again when the war came to an end. With the help of 42 goals from Charlie Vaughan, Sutton ran away with the 1945–46 season. This was also the first time the club won the Surrey Senior Cup and got through to the FA Cup first round.

The 1950s brought little success for Sutton, though the team is said to have progressed off the field. Assets were transferred to a limited company, something which was unusual for the time. In addition, the main stand was constructed, which today holds over 700 spectators. It was not until George Smith became manager that success returned; the Athenian League title was won for the third time in 1958 and the club won the London Senior Cup for the first time. Progress continued into the 60s under Sid Cann in Sutton's most successful period. In 1963, the club reached Wembley in the FA Amateur Cup, but lost 4–2 to Wimbledon.

=== Isthmian League ===
The summer after the cup success marked Sutton's election into the Isthmian League. In 1967, they won the league title. Two seasons later the club played at Wembley again for the Amateur Cup final, but in irony lost 2–1 to underdogs North Shields.

1970 brought great cup success to the club once more, but this time in the form of the FA Cup. Sutton beat Hillingdon Borough in the third round and went on to play Don Revie's top flight Leeds United, one of the best teams in Europe at the time, at Gander Green Lane. The match saw 14,000 spectators squeeze into the ground and Leeds, with 11 full internationals in the team, won 6–0.

Unfortunately, the next decade proved to be one of little success for the club and Sutton went through a succession of managers, including Ted Powell and Dario Gradi, both of whom played for the team and went on to manage at higher levels. It was not until Keith Blunt took charge that success returned to Gander Green Lane. His biggest achievement was to win the Anglo-Italian Cup in 1979, after a surprise 2–1 win over Chieti. This was the only time an English club won the honour in its semi-professional era.

Soon after the continental win, Keith Blunt moved on to manage Malmö and Barrie Williams took over. He guided Sutton to Wembley for the 1981 FA Trophy final, but the side lost to Bishop's Stortford. This was to be the club's last appearance at Wembley until 2021, a place which saw little success for them. During Williams's reign the club finished runners-up in the Anglo-Italian Cup twice more, in 1980 and 1982. The club also finished runners-up in the 1981–82 Isthmian League and in 1983 won a treble of the Surrey Senior, London Senior, and Hitachi Cups. The Surrey Senior Cup win was the first of six in as many years, a record that remains unbroken, as of May 2011.

=== Conference years ===
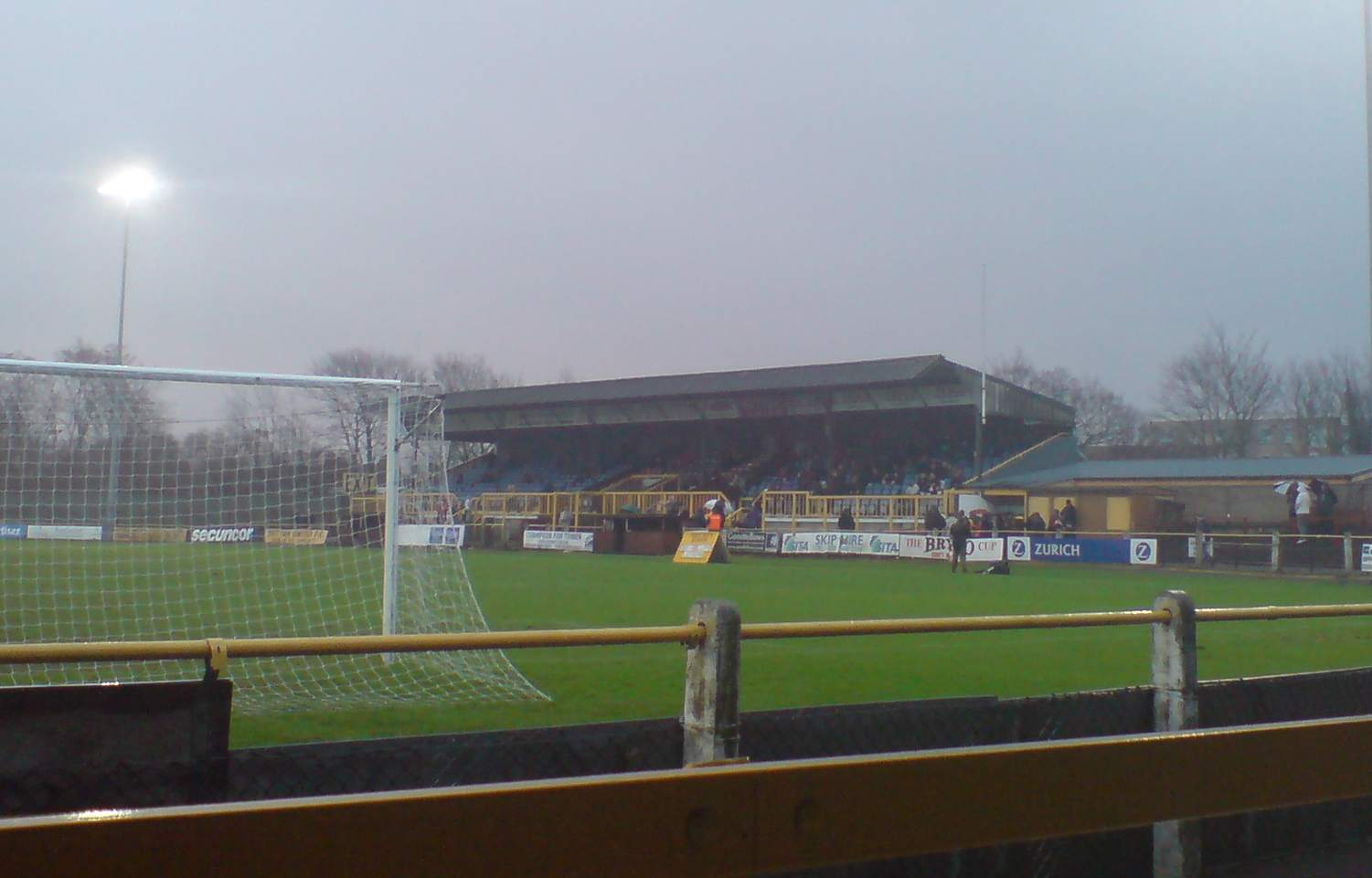
The Gander Green Lane ground, home of Sutton United

The club won the Isthmian League championship for the second time in 1985. After refusing promotion to the Football Conference because of issues with the stadium, they retained the championship the following year and this time accepted promotion after supporters helped in a large redevelopment of areas of the ground. Sutton managed to cement their place in the league, often finishing mid-table.

On 9 January 1988, Sutton drew with Middlesbrough of the Second Division, in the 1987–88 FA Cup, before losing the replay 1–0 at Ayresome Park. Sutton enjoyed a memorable FA Cup run in the following season in 1988–89. Entering the competition at the fourth qualifying round, they beat Walton & Hersham, Dagenham and Aylesbury United to set up a third round proper tie with First Division Coventry City, who were in the First Division and had won the trophy 18 months earlier. In a memorable game against Coventry City, Sutton won 2–1 with goals from Tony Rains and Matthew Hanlan, joining a small number of non-League clubs to beat top-division opponents in the competition. This was a 24-year record before the next non-League side beat a team from the top flight of English football. On 28 January 1989, Sutton lost to Norwich City of the First Division 8–0 in the fourth round.

=== Back into the Isthmian League ===
Two seasons later in 1991, the club suffered relegation to the Isthmian League because of a goal drought and a number of injuries. On 13 November 1993, Sutton defeated Colchester United of the Third Division 4–3 away from home in the FA Cup. On 4 December 1993, they beat Torquay of the Third Division in the FA Cup second round. Despite two top-three finishes following the relegation, a quick return to the Conference did not come until Sutton were Isthmian League champions in 1999 under former captain John Rains. During this period, Sutton claimed the scalps of several league clubs in the FA Cup, including Colchester United and Torquay United in 1993 alone. The stay in the Conference lasted just one season as the U's were relegated again in 2000.

The early 2000s were quiet times for Sutton, although the club is notable as the first-ever opponent of AFC Wimbledon, defeating the Dons 4–0 in a pre-season friendly in July 2002 in front of 4,657 at Gander Green Lane. Sutton won the Surrey Senior Cup in 2003 and the following season saw the team start well and recover from a bad spell over the winter to finish second.

=== Conference South ===
For the 2004–05 season, The FA planned for the introduction of two new divisions: the Conference North and Conference South. Because of Sutton's high finish in the Isthmian League Premier Division, they were selected to be a founding member of the Conference South. The next three seasons were unremarkable, with Sutton finishing mid-table each time and no real success in cup competitions.

John Rains stepped down as manager in March 2006 and Ian Hazel took over the reins. By October 2008, the team were at the bottom of the Conference South and looking destined for relegation. A string of managers, including Ernie Howe, Stuart Massey and Jimmy Dack failed to save the club, and Paul Doswell came in as manager during the 2008 close-season.

=== Paul Doswell (2008–2019) ===
Sutton finished fifth in their first season back in the Isthmian League Premier Division and 2nd the following season, losing in both seasons' play-off semi finals to Staines Town and Kingstonian respectively. But the 2010–11 season saw Sutton win the championship with three games to go and secure promotion back into the Conference South.

Back in the Conference South for the 2011–12 season, Sutton finished 4th but lost to Welling United in the play-off semi finals. In the 2013–14 season, they achieved their highest ever Conference South placing (2nd place), but again lost in the play-off semi finals to Dover Athletic. In the 2014–15 season they finished 15th.

For the 2015–16 season, the Conference South was renamed the National League South. The U's put together a run of 25 league games unbeaten, including a notable 2–0 victory over fellow title contenders Ebbsfleet United on 16 April 2016 in front of a home crowd of 3,142 (a club record for league match attendance at that time). On 23 April, Sutton defeated Chelmsford City at home 2–0 and were crowned champions of the National League South with a game to spare.

The club's first ever televised league game, broadcast live on BT Sport, was played against Tranmere Rovers at Gander Green Lane on 17 September 2016, a game which Sutton won 1–0. Paul Doswell celebrated his 500th game as manager of Sutton United on 8 October 2016 and the club made a special presentation to him before kick off.

In the second round of the 2016–17 FA Cup, Sutton defeated League Two side Cheltenham Town 2–1. In the third round, Sutton were drawn at home to local rivals AFC Wimbledon of League One, attracting a crowd of 5,013. A 0–0 draw set up a third round replay at Kingsmeadow which Sutton won 3–1 after coming from behind. On 29 January 2017, Sutton, captained by Jamie Collins, a part-time builder, beat Championship side Leeds United, 1–0 in the FA Cup, and reached the 5th round of the competition for the first time. They therefore became only the 9th non-League side to reach the 5th round of the FA Cup since 1945. They hosted Arsenal in the last 16 of the competition on 20 February which they lost 2–0. The game sparked a betting controversy surrounding the actions of Sutton's reserve goalkeeper Wayne Shaw, who ate a 'pastry' on the bench after Sun Bets offered odds of 8–1 against him eating a pie during the match. Shaw offered his resignation over the incident. Sutton finished the 2016–17 season mid-table in 12th.

In their final game of the 2017–18 season, and in front of a record league attendance of 3,541, Sutton beat Aldershot Town at home 2–1 to claim a play-off semi-final place and a best ever league finish of third in the fifth tier. The play-off semi-final took place on 6 May 2018 against Boreham Wood in which Sutton lost 3–2. In 2018, Sutton were invited to participate in the 2018–19 Scottish Challenge Cup after the competition had decided to include two National League clubs. On 8 September 2018, Sutton defeated Airdrieonians by 17 September 2018 in the second round of the tournament.

Following a temporary break in mid-March 2019, one month later Paul Doswell resigned after 11 years as manager, as Sutton finished 9th in the league. During that time his achievements included leading the club to two league promotions, a run to the fifth round of the FA Cup, a National League play-off semi-final and a first win for an English team in the Scottish Challenge Cup. The club also prospered off the pitch with regular match attendances increasing significantly, ground improvements and the formation of an academy for young players.

=== Promotion to the Football League (2019–2024) ===
On 1 May his successor was announced as Matt Gray, who had joined the club as head coach in December 2018. This was Gray's first appointment as a full manager.

Sutton were ranked 15th when the 2019–20 season was suspended because of the COVID-19 pandemic. In the following 2020–21 season, Sutton performed strongly throughout and on 23 May 2021 beat Hartlepool United at home 3–0, winning the National League with a game to spare and securing promotion to the English Football League for the first time in the club's 123-year history.

On 7 August 2021, Sutton played their first English Football League match, losing 2–1 to Forest Green Rovers. Sutton booked their place in the 2022 EFL Trophy final after defeating Wigan Athletic on penalties. In the final at Wembley Stadium, Sutton met Rotherham United, losing 4–2 after extra time. In their first League Two season, Sutton finished 8th, missing out on the play-offs by one point.

They finished 14th at the end of the 2022–23 season. In December 2023, Matt Gray was sacked with Sutton in 24th-place in League Two, six points from safety, after an 8–0 loss to Stockport. He was replaced with Steve Morrison. In the 2023–24 season, Sutton were relegated from the Football League after finishing in 23rd place.

=== Back in the National League ===
After a mid table finish in their first season back, Steve Morrison was sacked in October 2025 after Sutton were in the relegation zone. He was replaced by Chris Agutter.

== Club identity ==
=== Shirt and crest ===
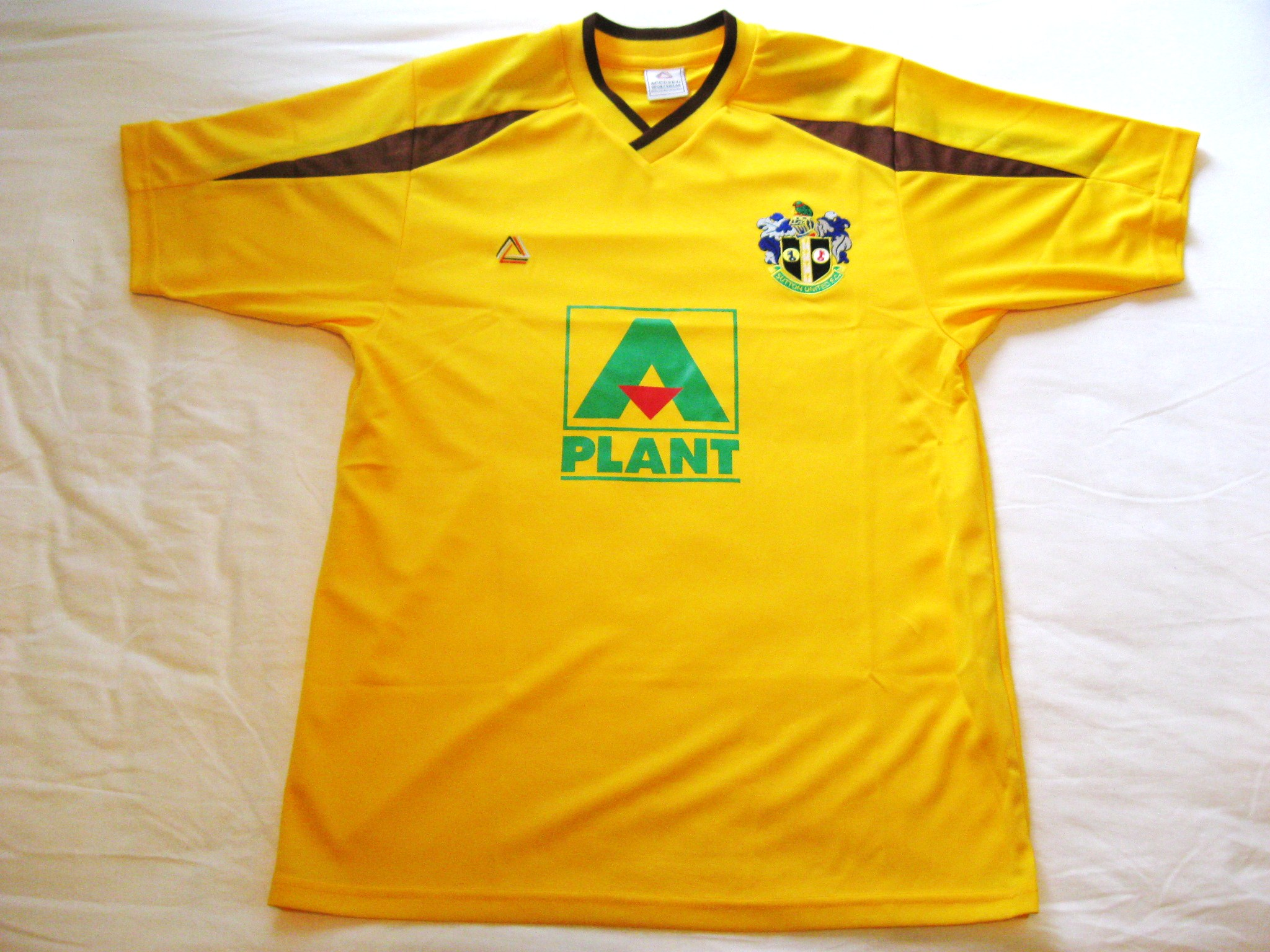
Home shirt for the 2010–11 season

The club's crest is derived from, and almost identical to the Arms of the Municipal Borough of Sutton and Cheam, the predecessor to the present day London Borough of Sutton, the only differences being some minor colour changes and the borough motto being replaced with the team name. The gold and silver discs on the shield and the keys inside the discs symbolise the ownership of Sutton by the Chertsey Abbey (as recorded in the Domesday Book). The popinjay which sits at the top of the badge is from the arms of the Lumleys, former lords of the Manor of Cheam. The crosses (now golden on the club's crest, but black on the borough's crest) represent the See of Canterbury, which held Cheam in the time of Cnut the Great. The badge also features a medieval helmet.

Sutton United began playing in 1898 wearing amber and chocolate brown stripes, adopting the colours of Sutton Association F.C., one of the two clubs who amalgamated to form United. The club made a brief experiment with green and white stripes for a season during the 1920s, but the team's form was poor and they soon reverted to amber and chocolate, which became hoops rather than stripes during the early 1930s. By the late 1930s, the home shirt had changed to amber and chocolate halves and this remained so until after the end of the Second World War. Another experiment was made with amber and chocolate quarters but by the late 1950s, home shirts were amber with chocolate numbers, worn with white shorts and white socks. Socks reverted to amber in the early to mid 1960s but the kit remained otherwise unchanged until 1974–75, when the shorts became chocolate.

By the late 1970s, Sutton wore an all amber kit with chocolate trim and it remained virtually unchanged until the club's centenary season in 1998–99, when a special design of amber and chocolate quarters worn with chocolate shorts was used. In the early 21st century, the home shirt became thick amber and chocolate stripes before new manager Paul Doswell ordered a return to an all amber kit for the 2008–09 season. The home shirt was redesigned for the 2016–17 season to be all amber with a single chocolate stripe running down the centre and chocolate trim on the collar and sleeves. It changed again in 2018–19 to amber with chocolate sleeves and trim. The colours have become synonymous with Sutton and fans at home games can often be heard chanting "we're the amber and chocolates" (to the tune of Seven Nation Army by The White Stripes).

Amateur football teams began wearing away or change kits after the end of the Second World War and Sutton initially wore a red and white away kit during the 1950s. Sutton first began wearing an all white away kit by at least the time of the 1963 Amateur Cup semi-final, when their opponents Hitchin wore red. Light blue and black and then brown kits (both modelled on Coventry City's kit at the time) appeared briefly in the late 1970s before the club reverted to all white. The away kit remained all white for the rest of the 20th century and into the 21st century, except for the 1998–99 centenary season when green and white quarters were worn, and a brief period using a broad green and white strip. The away shirt was redesigned for the 2016–17 season to be all white with a single red stripe running down the centre and red trim on the collar and sleeves. It changed again slightly in 2018–19 to all white with red trim.

Multiple kit changes occurred in the following years, including the new feathered amber home shirt for the 24/25 and 25/26 seasons with a pink home goalkeeper shirt in the 24/25 season and a new blue feathered home goalkeeper shirt in the 25/26 season.. These were produced by O'Neills, who also produced a new black and amber away kit for the 25/26 and 26/27 season. There was also a new white and green quartered third kit released early into the 25/26 season.

Under a new deal with VX3 announced in May 2026, Sutton United confirmed that the club would continue with its established two-year rotation for home and away kits. A new home kit would be released ahead of the upcoming 25/26 season, while the current black and amber away kit will remain in place for the 2026/27 campaign. The club also announced that it would now release a 3rd kit annually, with each release being a limited edition design and draw on inspiration from the club's local area and history.

Table of kit suppliers and shirt sponsors appear below:

Season	Kit Manufacturer	Home Shirt Sponsor	Away Shirt Sponsor
2002–2005	Kitz	Securicor	Securicor
2005–2007	Kitz	G4S plc	G4S plc
2007–2008	Kitz	Falcon Builders	G4S plc
2008–2009	Erreà	P.G.Marshall & Sons Ltd.	HSS Hire
2009–2010	TAG	A-Plant	Holiday inn
2010–2012	TAG	A-Plant	Allgold Coins
2012–2013	TAG	Paris Smith	Drew Smith
2013–2015	Joma	Drew Smith	Paris Smith
2015–2016	Joma	Banstead Downs	Paris Smith
2016–2017	Joma	Green Go Waste	Champion Timber
2016–2017	Joma	The Sun/Sun Bets	Champion Timber
2017–2018	Joma	Angel Plastics	Champion Timber
2018–2022	Macron	Angel Plastics	Angel Plastics
2022–2023	O'Neills	Angel Plastics	Angel Plastics
2023–2024	O'Neills	Echo Laser BPH Therapy	Echo Laser BPH Therapy
2024–2026	O'Neills	Telsa Media	Telsa Media
2026-present	VX3	Strike.com	Strike.com

=== Mascot ===
Sutton's mascot is Jenny the Giraffe. She attends all home matches and can be seen before kick-off. Jenny wears a Sutton United shirt and has been known to wear a scarf during the winter. On 3 October, Jenny took part in the 2010 Mascot Grand National at Huntingdon Racecourse and finished 5th out of 41 runners.

=== SUFC Gambia ===
There is a club in The Gambia called "Sutton United FC". In July 1999, Young Stars FC was formed by Father Andrew Cole and the team originally consisted of people going to Bible classes. The team was later renamed Sanchaba United, which means "Downtown" in the Mandinka language until an English visitor, known only as Walter, donated equipment to the club and suggested they change their name to Sutton United FC (Gambia). The club, which is located in Lamin Village on the outskirts of Banjul, plays in the third tier of Gambian football known as Nawettan.

== Ground ==
Sutton United play their home games at Gander Green Lane, officially the VBS Community Stadium for sponsorship reasons. Sutton United received the seats for the grandstand at Gander Green Lane from the remodelling of Stamford Bridge and were given to them by the Chelsea F.C. Pitch Owners. The capacity of the ground is 7,032 (1,132 seated).

== Supporters and rivalries ==
Sutton United's main rivals are Bromley and AFC Wimbledon.

Sutton's strongest rivalry is with Carshalton Athletic, with both sides within the London Borough of Sutton. Derby matches have been contested in the Athenian League, Isthmian League and the Conference South, as well as twelve different cup competitions. The teams have generally competed on Boxing Day, New Year's Day and other bank holidays. Sutton have the better record, one of the most famous meetings being a 6–0 win in 2002. In total, the two sides have met 133 times (as of August 2011), with Sutton winning on 72 of those occasions, Carshalton 33 and there have been 28 draws. The two sides last met in July 2011, in a two-legged friendly competition for the "Sutton Advertiser Cup", which Sutton won 3–1 on aggregate having won the home leg 3–0.

Until the 2022–23 season, Sutton had never shared a league with AFC Wimbledon, but due to the geographical proximity the two clubs share a rivalry, which has been dubbed the 'friendly derby'. The clubs first met in the third round of the 2016–17 FA Cup, Sutton were drawn at home and in front of a sell-out crowd on 7 January 2017, the game ended 0–0. The replay took place at Kingsmeadow in front of another capacity crowd, including 809 Sutton supporters, on 17 January. Goals from Roarie Deacon, Maxime Biamou and Dan Fitchett saw the U's complete a historic comeback and win the match 3–1, putting Sutton through to the fourth round of the FA Cup for the first time since 1989.

Sutton relaid the pitch at Gander Green Lane in August 2015 with 3G artificial turf and since then the club have contested matches with Maidstone United, who use a 3G pitch at the Gallagher Stadium, in what has been named by fans El Plastico (a reference to El Clásico). Bromley also laid a 3G pitch at Hayes Lane in 2017.

As Crystal Palace Women also play at the VBS Community Stadium, Crystal Palace paid for a new grass pitch at Gander Green Lane which was laid in the 2023–24 off-season.

== Records and statistics ==
- Best FA Cup performance: Fifth round, 2016–17
- Best League Cup performance: Third round, 2023–24
- Best EFL Trophy performance: Runners-up, 2021–22
- Best FA Trophy performance: Runners-up, 1980–81
- Highest League Finish: 8th in League Two, equivalent to 76th in the English football league system, 2021–22
- Record attendance: 14,000 vs. Leeds United, FA Cup fourth round, 24 January 1970
- Biggest victory: 11–1 vs. Clapton, 1966; 11–1 vs. Leatherhead, 1982–83, both Isthmian League
- Heaviest defeat: 13–0 vs. Barking, Athenian League, 1925–26
- Most appearances: Larry Pritchard, 781
- Most goals: Paul McKinnon, 279

== Players ==
=== Current squad ===
As of 7 November 2026

Note: Flags indicate national team as defined under FIFA eligibility rules; some limited exceptions apply. Players may hold more than one non-FIFA nationality.

No.	Pos.	Nation	Player
1	GK	ENG	Spike Brits (on loan from Manchester City)
2	DF	ENG	Kwaku Donkor
3	DF	KOS	Besart Topalloj
4	DF	ENG	Alex Kirk
5	DF	ENG	Will Nightingale
6	MF	ENG	Charlie Bell
7	MF	IRL	Emmanuel Osadebe
8	MF	WAL	Jake Taylor (captain)
9	FW	ENG	Temi Babalola
10	MF	ENG	Charlie Carter
11	FW	ENG	Sam Folarin
12	DF	ENG	Dan Urpens
13	GK	ENG	Chris Haigh (player-coach)
14	MF	BDI	Omar Mussa

No.	Pos.	Nation	Player
15	DF	ENG	Jordan Moore-Taylor
16	FW	ENG	Brandon Njoku
18	FW	ENG	David Ogbonna
19	MF	ENG	Joe Knight (on loan from Stevenage)
20	MF	GRN	Jermaine Francis
22	MF	ENG	Ronny Ruiz
24	MF	ENG	Omotolani Bello
25	GK	ALB	Klevis Muca
26	DF	ENG	Bobby Amartey (on loan from Leicester City)
27	DF	ENG	Ben Brookes (on loan from York City)
32	DF	ENG	Josh Muwana
33	MF	ENG	Frankie Humphries
34	DF	ENG	Blake San-Norton

=== Out on loan ===
Note: Flags indicate national team as defined under FIFA eligibility rules; some limited exceptions apply. Players may hold more than one non-FIFA nationality.

No.	Pos.	Nation	Player
17	DF	ENG	Toby Byron (at Slough Town)
21	DF	ENG	Adam Reeves (at Whitehawk)

No.	Pos.	Nation	Player
23	MF	ENG	Noah Nzuzi (at Maidstone United)

== Club management and support staff ==
As of 6 May 2026

Role	Name
Manager	Chris Agutter
Assistant Manager	Dean Hammond
First Team Coach/Analyst	Ben Cornelius
Strength & Conditioning Coach	Frankie Deegan
Head of Medical	Luke Silavwe
Kitman	Adam Groom
Lead Physio	Luke Silavwe
Director of Football	Terry Bullivant

== Honours ==
League

- National League (level 5)
  - Champions: 2020–21
- National League South (level 6)
  - Champions: 2015–16
- Isthmian League Premier Division
  - Champions: 1966–67, 1984–85, 1985–86, 1998–99, 2010–11
- Athenian League
  - Champions: 1927–28, 1945–46, 1957–58

Cup

- EFL Trophy
  - Runners-up: 2021–22
- FA Trophy
  - Runners-up: 1980–81
- National League Cup
  - Runners-up: 2024–25
- FA Amateur Cup
  - Runners-up: 1962–63, 1968–69
- Anglo-Italian Cup
  - Winners: 1978–79
- Athenian League Challenge Cup
  - Winners: 1945–46, 1955–56, 1961–62, 1962–63
- Bob Lord Trophy
  - Winners: 1990–91
- Isthmian League Cup
  - Winners: 1982–83, 1983–84, 1985–86, 1997–98
- Isthmian League Full Members' Cup
  - Winners: 1991–92, 1995–96
- London Senior Cup
  - Winners: 1957–58, 1982–83
- South Thames Cup
  - Winners: 1954–55, 1966–67, 1967–68
- Surrey Senior Cup
  - Winners (15): 1945–46, 1964–65, 1967–68, 1969–70, 1979–80, 1982–83, 1983–84, 1984–85, 1985–86, 1986–87, 1987–88, 1992–93, 1994–95, 1998–99, 2002–03
- President's Trophy
  - Winners: 2009–10 (shared), 2010–11 (shared)
