= 2010–11 North West Counties Football League =

The 2010–11 North West Counties Football League season (known as the Vodkat League for sponsorship reasons for the final occasion after four seasons) was the 29th in the history of the North West Counties Football League, a football competition in England.

The league comprised two divisions, the Premier Division and the First Division (at levels 9 and 10 of the English football league system, Steps 5 and 6 of the National League System respectively). Additionally there were two cup competitions: the League Challenge Cup knockout competition (known as the Vodkat League Challenge Cup for sponsorship reasons) open to all the league's clubs; and the First Division Trophy, a knockout trophy competition for First Division clubs only. The league also had a reserves team section.

== Premier Division ==
North West Counties Football League Premier Division
- Season: 2010–11
- Teams: 22
- Champions: New Mills
- Promoted: New Mills
- Relegated: Formby
- Matches: 462
- Goals: 1,624 (3.52 per match)
- Average attendance: 106

The Premier Division featured 22 clubs, 19 remained from the previous season plus 3 additions:

- Barnoldswick Town, promoted as runners up of the First Division
- Rossendale United, relegated from the Northern Premier League First Division North
- Stone Dominoes, promoted as champions of the First Division

At the end of the season the champions New Mills were promoted to the Northern Premier League First Division South. Two clubs left the division: eighteenth placed Formby were demoted to the First Division for breaching the league rule concerning notification of the change in ownership/entity; and Rossendale United who finished twenty-first were expelled as they had not renewed their membership or paid fees and fines, and for general maladministration. As no club was to be relegated into this division next season and with the removal of the two clubs for irregularities the bottom club Ashton Athletic were reprieved from relegation. Over the season the average goals scored per match for all Premier Division (formerly Division One) matches increased to a new high of 3.52 goals per match (a slight increase over the 3.50 during the 2006–07 season).

=== League table ===
Pos	Team	Pld	W	D	L	GF	GA	GD	Pts	Season End Notes
1	New Mills (C, P)	42	32	6	4	102	38	+64	102	Promoted to Northern Premier; League First Division South
2	Ramsbottom United	42	29	4	9	101	45	+56	91	
3	Winsford United	42	26	5	11	99	50	+49	83	
4	Padiham	42	21	10	11	84	62	+22	73	
5	Colne	42	21	10	11	90	73	+17	73	
6	Bootle	42	21	9	12	78	56	+22	72	
7	Barnoldswick Town	42	19	12	11	81	58	+23	69	
8	Congleton Town	42	18	10	14	70	60	+10	64	
9	Squires Gate	42	18	10	14	74	70	+4	64	
10	Atherton Laburnum Rovers	42	19	6	17	75	72	+3	63	
11	Bacup Borough	42	17	10	15	69	56	+13	61	
12	Runcorn Linnets	42	16	8	18	68	77	−9	56	
13	Maine Road	42	15	9	18	69	64	+5	54	
14	Glossop North End	42	14	11	17	68	55	+13	53	
15	Flixton	42	13	9	20	78	91	−13	48	
16	Silsden	42	13	9	20	47	74	−27	48	
17	St Helens Town	42	14	5	23	79	116	−37	47	
18	Formby (R)	42	11	10	21	67	95	−28	43	Demoted to First Division (rules breach)
19	Stone Dominoes	42	12	6	24	60	90	−30	42	
20	Alsager Town	42	10	8	24	57	94	−37	38	
21	Rossendale United	42	6	11	25	63	106	−43	29	Expelled from league (fees/fines not paid)
22	Ashton Athletic	42	5	6	31	45	122	−77	21	Reprieved from relegation

Source: "Final Tables, Season 2010/11". nwcfl.com., "North West Counties League 2000-11: 2010–11". nonleaguematters.co.uk.
Rules for classification: 1) points; 2) goal difference; 3) number of goals scored.
(C) Champions; (P) Promoted; (R) Relegated

== First Division ==
North West Counties Football League First Division
- Season: 2010–11
- Teams: 18
- Champions: A.F.C. Blackpool
- Promoted: A.F.C. Blackpool; Runcorn Town; A.F.C. Liverpool
- Relegated: None
- Matches: 306
- Goals: 1,102 (3.6 per match)
- Average attendance: 50

The First Division featured 18 clubs, 15 remained from the previous season plus 3 additions:

- Runcorn Town, from 3rd in the West Cheshire League
- A.F.C. Darwen, from 8th in the West Lancashire League
- Abbey Hey, relegated from the Premier Division

At the end of the season A.F.C. Blackpool and Runcorn Town were promoted as champions and runners-up respectively to the Premier Division; owing to three clubs leaving the Premier Division a further promotion position from the this division was available: third placed Holker Old Boys declined the promotion which was taken up by fourth placed A.F.C. Liverpool.

=== League table ===
Pos	Team	Pld	W	D	L	GF	GA	GD	Pts	Season End Notes
1	A.F.C. Blackpool (C, P)	34	28	3	3	94	30	+64	87	Promoted to Premier Division
2	Runcorn Town (P)	34	26	6	2	114	39	+75	81 (Note: Eccleshall, Runcorn Town and Wigan Robin Park each had 3 points deducted)	Promoted to Premier Division
3	Holker Old Boys	34	19	6	9	77	42	+35	63	Declined to take Promotion
4	A.F.C. Liverpool (P)	34	19	6	9	65	34	+31	63	Promoted to Premier Division
5	Atherton Collieries	34	18	6	10	70	44	+26	60	
6	Chadderton	34	18	6	10	64	48	+16	60	
7	Norton United	34	17	7	10	64	54	+10	58	
8	Wigan Robin Park	34	17	5	12	68	51	+17	53	
9	Irlam	34	14	5	15	63	69	−6	47	
10	Cheadle Town	34	13	7	14	54	62	−8	46	
11	Eccleshall	34	15	3	16	64	70	−6	45	
12	Leek County School Old Boys	34	11	9	14	54	58	−4	42	
13	A.F.C. Darwen	34	9	10	15	38	69	−31	37	
14	Daisy Hill	34	6	8	20	47	90	−43	26	
15	Abbey Hey	34	6	6	22	48	72	−24	24	
16	Ashton Town	34	5	8	21	37	86	−49	23	
17	Oldham Boro	34	5	6	23	37	77	−40	21	
18	Rochdale Town	34	2	9	23	44	107	−63	15	

Source: "Final Tables, Season 2010/11". nwcfl.com., "North West Counties League 2000-11: 2010–11". nonleaguematters.co.uk.
Rules for classification: 1) points; 2) goal difference; 3) number of goals scored.
(C) Champions; (P) Promoted

== League Challenge Cup ==
The 2010–11 League Challenge Cup (known as the Vodkat League Challenge Cup for sponsorship reasons) was a knockout competition open to all the league's clubs. The final, played at Curzon Ashton F.C. between two Premier Division clubs, was won by the previous season's losing finalist Winsford United who defeated New Mills 1–0 and thus denied them a league and cup double.

Quarter-finals, Semi-finals and Final

Quarter-finals
Glossop North End (PD)	0
New Mills (PD)	2
Wigan Robin Park (FD)	1
Runcorn Town (FD)	6
Formby (PD)	1 (Note: after extra time, score at 90 minutes: 1–1)
Winsford United (PD)	2
A.F.C. Blackpool (FD)	2
Irlam (FD)	1

Semi-finals
New Mills (PD)	3
Runcorn Town (FD)	2
Winsford United (PD)	2
A.F.C. Blackpool (FD)	1

Final (Note: Played at Curzon Ashton F.C.)
New Mills (PD)	0
Winsford United (PD)	1

Club's division appended to team name: (PD)=Premier Division; (FD)=First Division
source: "League Cup 2010/2011". May 2011. Archived from the original on 26 April 2012.

== First Division Trophy ==
The 2010–11 First Division Trophy was a knockout competition for First Division clubs only. The final, held at Flixton F.C., was won 3–2 after extra time (score at 90 minutes: 2–2) by Atherton Collieries who defeated A.F.C. Liverpool denying them a hat-trick of trophy wins.

Semi-finals and Final

Semi-finals
A.F.C. Blackpool	1
A.F.C. Liverpool	2
Irlam	1
Atherton Collieries	3

Final (Note: Played at Flixton F.C.)
A.F.C. Liverpool	2 (Note: after extra time, score at 90 minutes: 2–2)
Atherton Collieries	3

source: "First Division Trophy 2010/2011". May 2011. Archived from the original on 26 April 2012.

== Reserves Section ==
Main honours for the 2010–11 season:

- Reserves Division
  - Winners: Padiham Reserves
  - Runners-up: Glossop North End Reserves
- Reserves Division Cup
  - Winners: Glossop North End Reserves
  - Runners-up: Ashton Athletic Reserves
