= 2011–12 North West Counties Football League =

The 2011–12 North West Counties Football League season was the 30th in the history of the North West Counties Football League, a football competition in England.

The league comprised two divisions, the Premier Division and the First Division (at levels 9 and 10 of the English football league system, Steps 5 and 6 of the National League System respectively). Additionally there were two cup competitions: the League Challenge Cup knockout competition open to all the league's clubs; and the First Division Trophy, a knockout trophy competition for First Division clubs only. The league also had a reserves team section.

== Premier Division ==
North West Counties Football League Premier Division
- Season: 2011–12
- Teams: 22
- Champions: Ramsbottom United
- Promoted: Ramsbottom United
- Relegated: Atherton Laburnum Rovers
- Matches: 461
- Goals: 1,492 (3.24 per match)
- Average attendance: 106

The Premier Division featured 22 clubs, 19 remained from the previous season plus 3 additions (all from the First Division):

- A.F.C. Blackpool, promoted as champions
- Runcorn Town, promoted as runners-up
- A.F.C. Liverpool, promoted from fourth position

One league match was not played: Bacup Borough refused to play a fixture versus Colne (scheduled for one day prior to Bacup's appearance in the League Challenge Cup final) and were subsequently fined and had three points deducted with Colne awarded three points.

At the end of the season the champions Ramsbottom United were promoted to the Northern Premier League First Division North. Two other clubs left the division: Flixton who resigned; and Atherton Laburnum Rovers who were relegated to the First Division. Owing to Flixton's resignation St Helens Town (who had been ever present in the league's top division) were reprieved from relegation.

=== League table ===
Pos	Team	Pld	W	D	L	GF	GA	GD	Pts	Season End Notes
1	Ramsbottom United (C, P)	42	31	3	8	108	43	+65	96	Promoted to Northern Premier; League First Division North
2	Runcorn Town	42	29	5	8	111	49	+62	92	
3	Bootle	42	24	13	5	87	43	+44	85	
4	Barnoldswick Town	42	26	5	11	73	38	+35	83	
5	Runcorn Linnets	42	22	10	10	70	62	+8	76	
6	Glossop North End	42	22	7	13	76	42	+34	73	
7	Winsford United	42	21	6	15	88	69	+19	69	
8	Colne	41	18	4	19	68	60	+8	61 (Note: Colne awarded and Bacup deducted three points (Bacup failed to fulfil a fixture between them).)	
9	AFC Blackpool	42	17	10	15	67	64	+3	61	
10	Flixton	42	18	5	19	69	68	+1	59	Resigned (after the season)
11	Congleton Town	42	18	5	19	56	64	−8	59	
12	Silsden	42	16	9	17	59	59	0	57	
13	Alsager Town	42	16	9	17	63	65	−2	57	
14	Ashton Athletic	42	15	6	21	70	80	−10	51	
15	Padiham	42	14	9	19	51	65	−14	51	
16	Squires Gate	42	14	8	20	74	89	−15	50	
17	Bacup Borough	41	15	7	19	59	77	−18	49	
18	Maine Road	42	13	9	20	58	69	−11	48	
19	AFC Liverpool	42	13	6	23	60	73	−13	45	
20	Stone Dominoes	42	10	6	26	39	92	−53	36	
21	St Helens Town	42	6	8	28	50	105	−55	26	Reprieved from relegation
22	Atherton Laburnum Rovers (R)	42	5	6	31	36	116	−80	21	Relegated to First Division

Source: "Final Tables, Season 2011/12". nwcfl.com., "North West Counties League - North West Counties League Premier Division: 2011 – 12: League Table". nonleaguematters.co.uk.
Rules for classification: 1) points; 2) goal difference; 3) number of goals scored.
(C) Champions; (P) Promoted; (R) Relegated

=== Results ===
Home \ Away	ABL	ALV	ALS	ASH	ALR	BAC	BWT	BTL	CLN	CON	FLX	GNE	MNR	PAD	RAM	RNL	RNT	SIL	SQG	STH	SDM	WNS
AFC Blackpool		1–3	1–0	1–0	4–3	2–1	0–0	1–0	1–0	1–2	3–2	1–3	1–1	2–0	0–3	2–3	1–2	2–1	2–0	2–2	0–1	2–5
AFC Liverpool	3–2		2–3	0–1	1–2	1–0	0–1	2–3	1–1	0–2	2–1	0–1	0–2	1–1	2–1	2–1	0–3	0–1	3–2	2–2	6–0	7–0
Alsager Town	1–0	1–2		3–2	5–0	2–2	1–2	2–4	0–2	1–2	2–1	1–0	2–2	2–0	0–5	0–0	0–3	0–2	2–1	3–2	0–2	1–2
Ashton Athletic	1–1	3–2	1–3		4–0	2–3	0–0	1–0	3–4	2–1	0–1	0–4	2–0	1–3	1–4	1–2	1–5	0–2	2–1	4–0	3–1	2–2
Atherton LR	2–2	0–2	3–2	0–3		1–2	0–2	1–3	2–5	0–2	0–3	2–1	2–3	1–1	1–3	0–2	0–5	1–0	3–2	0–0	1–1	1–4
Bacup Borough	0–2	3–2	3–3	1–4	2–0		1–3	2–1	X (Note: Bacup Borough v Colne: Match not played)	3–4	1–1	3–0	2–0	1–0	0–1	0–1	1–6	2–1	2–4	3–2	1–1	3–6
Barnoldswick T	2–0	3–1	1–0	3–1	4–0	1–2		1–1	2–0	2–0	2–1	2–1	2–1	3–1	0–2	3–0	1–2	0–1	1–2	4–0	3–0	1–0
Bootle	0–2	3–0	2–2	3–3	3–0	2–1	2–3		2–0	1–1	3–1	2–1	3–1	1–0	2–2	1–1	0–0	4–0	3–0	5–1	0–0	1–1
Colne	1–1	1–2	0–2	4–2	6–0	1–0	0–0	0–2		1–3	3–2	0–3	0–2	0–1	0–1	2–1	3–4	1–0	3–0	1–2	0–1	1–6
Congleton Town	0–3	1–0	2–1	1–2	1–0	1–2	0–0	2–3	1–3		0–3	0–1	0–1	2–1	0–1	2–1	2–2	1–0	3–0	1–0	1–1	1–2
Flixton	1–2	2–1	0–1	2–2	6–1	0–1	2–0	0–1	2–1	0–2		1–5	2–0	2–0	0–3	0–2	2–0	2–1	2–3	1–0	1–0	2–1
Glossop NE	2–0	0–0	1–1	2–1	3–1	0–1	2–1	0–1	1–1	4–1	7–1		1–1	0–0	1–4	5–0	0–1	1–3	2–0	3–0	4–0	1–0
Maine Road	2–2	3–0	0–0	0–0	3–1	3–2	1–2	2–3	0–3	2–1	0–3	1–0		3–0	0–2	1–2	0–2	0–2	3–3	2–1	0–1	1–4
Padiham	2–2	2–1	1–1	1–2	2–1	3–1	1–0	1–4	1–5	2–0	1–1	0–1	2–1		1–2	3–0	2–4	0–4	2–1	3–1	0–1	0–3
Ramsbottom U	3–2	3–1	0–1	5–3	4–0	3–2	3–2	1–1	0–2	3–0	2–2	3–1	3–1	2–3		4–2	1–2	3–0	4–0	5–0	5–0	5–2
Runcorn Linnets	3–3	3–0	3–2	1–0	2–0	2–1	1–0	1–1	2–1	2–0	2–2	1–1	2–2	0–0	1–2		2–1	1–0	3–2	1–0	1–1	1–5
Runcorn Town	1–2	1–0	2–0	4–1	6–0	7–0	1–2	1–1	1–0	3–2	6–2	2–3	4–1	2–2	1–3	3–2		3–0	0–1	4–2	4–1	3–1
Silsden	0–1	3–4	2–2	1–0	2–2	1–1	0–4	1–1	0–2	3–3	0–1	1–0	1–0	1–0	2–1	4–4	1–2		3–0	1–1	3–0	1–0
Squires Gate	2–1	2–2	2–0	4–3	2–2	2–2	1–4	1–3	1–2	5–1	3–2	0–1	3–3	3–2	1–0	0–1	2–2	2–2		6–1	3–0	1–1
St Helens Town	3–2	3–1	0–3	2–3	3–0	0–0	4–2	1–2	2–5	1–3	0–5	2–5	0–3	1–1	3–2	0–1	1–2	1–1	3–5		1–1	1–4
Stone Dominoes	1–5	4–0	0–3	0–2	2–1	1–0	1–2	2–3	0–2	1–2	1–4	1–3	0–5	0–3	0–2	5–8	1–3	1–3	3–1	2–1		0–1
Winsford United	2–2	1–1	3–4	3–1	3–1	0–1	1–2	0–6	3–1	0–2	3–0	1–1	3–1	1–2	0–2	0–1	2–1	5–4	5–0	1–0	1–0	

Source: "Premier Division Results 2011/12". nwcfl.com.
Legend: Blue = home team win; Yellow = draw; Red = away team win.

=== Locations ===
Locations of the 2011–12 North West Counties Football League Premier Division teams

== First Division ==
North West Counties Football League First Division
- Season: 2011–12
- Teams: 18
- Champions: Wigan Robin Park
- Promoted: Norton United; Wigan Robin Park
- Relegated: None
- Matches: 306
- Goals: 1,144 (3.74 per match)
- Average attendance: 41

The First Division featured 18 clubs, 15 remained from the previous season plus 3 additions:

- Formby, demoted from the Premier Division
- Nelson, a re-formed team returning to the league (having resigned from the 2009–10 Premier Division)
- Northwich Villa, from 9th in the Cheshire Football League First Division

At the end of the season the champions Wigan Robin Park and runners-up Norton United were promoted to the Premier Division. No other clubs left the division.

=== League table ===
Pos	Team	Pld	W	D	L	GF	GA	GD	Pts	Season End Notes
1	Wigan Robin Park (C, P)	34	25	6	3	90	36	+54	81	Promoted to Premier Division
2	Norton United (P)	34	24	8	2	110	43	+67	80	Promoted to Premier Division
3	Abbey Hey	34	22	3	9	82	44	+38	69	
4	Atherton Collieries	34	15	7	12	69	52	+17	52	
5	Rochdale Town	34	14	10	10	72	57	+15	52	
6	Chadderton	34	13	10	11	53	51	+2	49	
7	Eccleshall	34	14	5	15	52	64	−12	47	
8	Cheadle Town	34	13	9	12	60	61	−1	45 (Note: Cheadle Town had three points deducted for breaching league rules)	
9	Holker Old Boys	34	12	9	13	53	64	−11	45	
10	Irlam	34	13	5	16	68	75	−7	44	
11	Formby	34	13	4	17	72	69	+3	43	
12	Daisy Hill	34	12	5	17	59	67	−8	41	
13	AFC Darwen	34	10	8	16	62	77	−15	38	
14	Oldham Boro	34	9	10	15	52	56	−4	37	
15	Nelson	34	9	5	20	40	83	−43	32	
16	Northwich Villa	34	7	10	17	51	86	−35	31	
17	Leek County School Old Boys	34	10	7	17	50	70	−20	30 (Note: Leek County School Old Boys had seven points deducted for breaching league rules)	
18	Ashton Town	34	6	9	19	49	89	−40	27	

Source: "Final Tables, Season 2011/12". nwcfl.com., "North West Counties League - North West Counties League Division One North: 2011 – 12: League Table". nonleaguematters.co.uk.
Rules for classification: 1) points; 2) goal difference; 3) number of goals scored.
(C) Champions; (P) Promoted

=== Results ===
Home \ Away	ABH	ADR	AST	ACO	CHA	CHT	DSH	ECC	FOR	HOB	IRL	LCS	NEL	NWV	NOR	OLD	RCH	WRP
Abbey Hey		6–1	2–2	1–0	5–1	4–1	4–0	3–1	4–0	1–3	3–0	1–0	5–1	4–3	0–4	1–0	1–1	1–2
AFC Darwen	1–2		0–4	1–1	1–1	0–3	1–2	5–2	4–1	3–0	6–1	2–4	2–1	2–2	0–5	1–3	0–0	2–3
Ashton Town	1–2	5–0		1–1	1–2	0–0	2–6	1–2	0–2	1–1	3–4	3–3	2–1	1–3	0–6	2–3	1–4	0–4
Atherton Colls.	2–1	3–1	2–3		1–2	4–1	1–1	2–2	2–1	5–0	2–1	2–1	5–0	5–1	3–0	3–2	0–3	0–1
Chadderton	0–0	1–2	3–0	3–0		2–1	2–1	1–1	2–3	1–0	2–1	3–1	1–1	0–0	3–3	0–0	3–4	1–2
Cheadle Town	3–1	2–4	2–2	2–2	1–2		1–3	1–2	3–6	0–0	2–2	4–3	2–3	3–0	1–1	1–2	2–1	1–3
Daisy Hill	3–5	2–2	3–1	1–1	2–1	1–2		0–2	1–0	1–0	1–3	0–2	2–2	3–2	2–3	2–1	4–2	0–2
Eccleshall	3–4	3–0	4–1	0–4	2–5	0–5	3–2		1–0	1–2	5–3	2–1	2–1	1–2	0–1	1–4	1–2	2–2
Formby	0–1	2–3	2–2	3–0	4–1	0–1	1–3	4–1		4–3	2–5	3–4	3–0	0–1	1–0	2–0	1–2	2–3
Holker OB	0–1	0–7	1–1	2–1	1–1	3–3	2–2	1–2	1–2		2–1	4–2	2–0	2–1	1–2	2–1	2–1	2–2
Irlam	0–4	1–3	1–0	3–2	2–1	1–3	4–0	0–0	2–1	1–3		5–0	3–2	0–6	2–3	4–2	1–1	1–4
Leek CSOB	0–3	2–0	3–0	0–0	1–0	2–3	2–1	0–0	2–2	0–3	1–1		0–1	2–2	3–3	3–2	0–1	0–4
Nelson	0–3	1–0	3–2	4–3	2–3	0–1	1–0	1–2	2–2	2–1	1–9	1–0		3–0	1–3	0–5	0–3	0–3
Northwich Villa	1–3	2–2	2–2	1–5	2–2	1–1	1–4	2–0	0–6	2–4	0–3	0–4	1–1		1–2	1–4	2–2	3–2
Norton United	3–2	5–1	5–1	3–2	3–0	5–0	3–1	2–0	7–4	6–3	3–0	6–1	5–0	6–1		0–0	2–2	5–2
Oldham Boro	2–1	2–2	1–3	0–1	0–0	0–2	3–2	1–3	1–2	0–0	2–1	1–2	1–1	2–2	1–1		2–5	0–1
Rochdale T	4–3	2–2	0–1	2–3	2–3	0–1	3–2	0–1	3–2	2–2	1–1	4–1	5–2	3–0	3–3	3–3		1–4
Wigan Robin P	1–0	3–1	11–0	4–1	1–0	1–1	2–1	1–0	4–4	4–0	4–1	3–0	2–1	2–3	1–1	1–1	1–0	

Source: First Division Results: 2011/12 season
Legend: Blue = home team win; Yellow = draw; Red = away team win.

=== Locations ===
Locations of the 2011–12 North West Counties Football League First Division teams

== League Challenge Cup ==
The 2011–12 League Challenge Cup was a knockout competition open to all the league's 40 clubs. The final, played at Curzon Ashton F.C. between Premier Division clubs, was won by Bacup Borough who defeated Maine Road 5–0 – the largest winning margin in a League Challenge Cup final and the first occasion a club was credited with 5 goals in the 90 minute match. It was the second occasion Bacup had won the cup (previously in the 2003–04 season), the fourth club to achieve the this.

Quarter-finals, Semi-finals and Final

(The semi-finals were decided on aggregate score from two legs played)

Quarter-finals
Runcorn Linnets (PD)	1
Bacup Borough (PD)	2
Barnoldswick Town (PD)	1
A.F.C. Blackpool (PD)	0
Ramsbottom United (PD)	2
Norton United (FD)	3
Bootle (PD)	2 (Note: After extra time, score at 90 minutes: 2–2)	2 (2 p) (Note: Replay: penalty shoot-out following 2–2 draw after extra time, score at 90 minutes: 2–2)
Maine Road (PD)	2	2 (3 p)

Semi-finals
Bacup Borough (PD)	0	2	2
Barnoldswick Town (PD)	1	0	1
Norton United (FD)	1	0 (Note: Replayed match. First match abandoned after 33 minutes (floodlight failure) with Maine Road leading 1-0)	1
Maine Road (PD)	2	2	4

Final (Note: Played at Curzon Ashton F.C.)
Bacup Borough (PD)	5
Maine Road (PD)	0

Club's division appended to team name: (PD)=Premier Division; (FD)=First Division
source: "League Challenge Cup: 2011/2012 Season". nwcfl.com.

== First Division Trophy ==
The 2011–12 First Division Trophy was a knockout competition for the 18 First Division clubs only. The final between the division's top two clubs, held at Ramsbottom United F.C., was won 3–1 after extra time (score at 90 minutes: 1–1) by Norton United who defeated Wigan Robin Park who were thus denied a First Division league and cup double.

Semi-finals and Final

(The semi-finals were decided on aggregate score from two legs played)

Semi-finals
Nelson	0	2	2
Norton United	1	3	4
Wigan Robin Park	5	1	6
Irlam	2	2	4

Final (Note: Played at Ramsbottom United F.C.)
Norton United	3 (Note: after extra time, score at 90 minutes: 1–1)
Wigan Robin Park	1

source: "First Division Trophy: 2011/2012 Season". nwcfl.com.

== Reserves Section ==
Main honours for the 2011–12 season:

- Reserves Division
  - Winners: Wigan Robin Park Reserves
  - Runners-up: New Mills Reserves
- Reserves Division Cup
  - Winners: Padiham Reserves
  - Runners-up: Silsden Reserves
