= 2012–13 North West Counties Football League =

The 2012–13 North West Counties Football League season was the 31st in the history of the North West Counties Football League, a football competition in England.

The league comprised two divisions, the Premier Division and the First Division (at levels 9 and 10 of the English football league system, Steps 5 and 6 of the National League System respectively). Additionally there were two cup competitions: the League Challenge Cup knockout competition open to all the league's clubs; and the First Division Trophy, a knockout trophy competition for First Division clubs only. The league also had a reserves team section.

== Premier Division ==
North West Counties Football League Premier Division
- Season: 2012–13
- Teams: 22
- Champions: Padiham
- Promoted: Padiham
- Relegated: none
- Matches: 462
- Goals: 1,571 (3.4 per match)
- Average attendance: 100

The Premier Division featured 22 clubs, 19 remaining from the previous season plus 3 additions:

- Norton United, promoted as runners-up of the First Division
- Stockport Sports (formerly Woodley Sports), relegated from the Northern Premier League First Division North
- Wigan Robin Park, promoted as champions of the First Division

Following an initiative by Football Association to standardise rules, to vet and approve clubs for promotion and direct them into the various leagues of the National League System the promotion/relegation process was formalised and more centrally controlled. Ten clubs from this league registered (by the 30 November 2012 deadline) for prospective promotion, they were: Barnoldswick Town, Bootle, Colne, Congleton Town, Glossop North End, Maine Road, Padiham, Runcorn Linnets, Runcorn Town and Winsford United.

At the end of the season only the champions Padiham were promoted to the Northern Premier League First Division North. With no club to be relegated into the division for next season Squires Gate were reprieved from relegation and only one club, bottom placed Stone Dominoes, were to be relegated – but they resigned at the end of the season: they had conceded 166 goals with a negative goal difference of 135 from 42 matches creating league highest records for both (exceeding the record of Blackpool Mechanics from the 1997–98 Division Two of 165 goals conceded and a 132 negative goal difference from 40 matches).

=== League table ===
Pos	Team	Pld	W	D	L	GF	GA	GD	Pts	Season End Notes
1	Padiham (C, P)	42	26	10	6	92	45	+47	88	Promoted to Northern Premier; League Division One North
2	Maine Road	42	28	3	11	99	57	+42	87	
3	Bootle	42	26	8	8	79	43	+36	86	
4	Runcorn Town	42	26	9	7	105	45	+60	84 (Note: Runcorn Town had 3 points deducted (fielding an ineligible player))	
5	Winsford United	42	25	8	9	85	45	+40	83	
6	Runcorn Linnets	42	21	9	12	82	58	+24	72	
7	Congleton Town	42	20	9	13	85	55	+30	69	
8	Colne	42	19	10	13	93	60	+33	67	
9	Barnoldswick Town	42	19	9	14	77	57	+20	66	
10	AFC Blackpool	42	19	9	14	60	58	+2	66	
11	AFC Liverpool	42	18	6	18	69	64	+5	60	
12	Wigan Robin Park	42	17	5	20	66	71	−5	56	
13	Glossop North End	42	14	11	17	73	71	+2	53	
14	Norton United	42	16	7	19	69	83	−14	52 (Note: Norton United had 3 points deducted (breach of league rules))	
15	Alsager Town	42	14	8	20	66	78	−12	50	
16	Stockport Sports	42	14	13	15	72	69	+3	49 (Note: Stockport Sports had 6 points deducted (breach of league rules))	
17	Bacup Borough	42	13	8	21	51	71	−20	47	
18	Silsden	42	11	6	25	58	98	−40	39	
19	St Helens Town	42	9	9	24	54	91	−37	36	
20	Ashton Athletic	42	10	5	27	58	91	−33	35	
21	Squires Gate	42	8	6	28	47	95	−48	30	
22	Stone Dominoes	42	3	4	35	31	166	−135	13	Resigned (after the season)

Source: "Final Tables, Season 2012/13". nwcfl.com., "North West Counties League - North West Counties League Premier Division: 2012 – 13: League Table". nonleaguematters.co.uk.
Rules for classification: 1) points; 2) goal difference; 3) number of goals scored.
(C) Champions; (P) Promoted

=== Results ===
Home \ Away	ABL	ALV	ALS	ASH	BAC	BAR	BTL	CLN	CON	GNE	MNR	NOR	PAD	RNL	RNT	SIL	SQG	STH	STS	SDM	WRP	WNS
AFC Blackpool		2–1	3–1	2–0	0–1	0–0	3–1	0–5	2–1	1–1	2–4	1–0	0–1	1–1	1–1	3–0	1–2	0–0	3–2	2–0	2–3	1–1
AFC Liverpool	0–0		3–0	1–3	2–2	1–1	2–1	3–2	3–1	1–2	2–4	2–3	2–3	2–0	0–1	2–1	1–0	3–1	1–1	4–1	1–2	0–1
Alsager Town	1–0	0–1		4–1	2–1	2–3	1–3	2–0	1–0	0–0	0–2	5–2	0–1	1–2	0–2	1–2	0–3	2–0	1–2	2–0	4–2	0–4
Ashton Athletic	2–4	1–1	4–0		2–1	2–0	0–3	1–3	2–3	1–0	2–3	0–2	0–3	0–6	0–1	2–2	4–0	2–2	0–4	3–0	3–1	1–2
Bacup Borough	1–0	1–0	2–1	2–6		1–3	2–4	2–2	1–0	0–0	2–1	2–2	1–2	4–1	1–2	3–1	0–0	0–0	2–1	4–0	0–1	1–2
Barnoldswick T	0–1	1–0	1–2	2–1	1–0		0–0	0–4	2–3	3–1	4–0	0–1	2–2	1–2	3–5	2–0	3–2	4–2	3–0	2–2	1–1	2–3
Bootle	2–1	1–0	1–1	1–0	2–0	3–6		2–1	3–2	2–0	1–2	1–1	2–2	2–0	1–0	2–1	2–2	2–2	2–0	7–0	2–0	3–1
Colne	4–2	0–3	2–3	3–2	6–0	0–1	2–1		1–0	3–1	1–2	0–0	1–1	2–0	3–5	5–0	2–0	1–2	1–1	5–1	3–3	3–2
Congleton Town	5–1	2–2	4–4	3–0	4–2	2–1	0–2	0–1		1–0	2–2	0–0	1–1	1–1	0–0	3–1	3–0	2–0	3–0	5–0	3–1	0–0
Glossop NE	4–4	6–2	1–1	3–0	2–0	1–2	0–1	1–1	3–2		1–4	1–2	2–3	1–2	3–2	2–0	4–0	3–4	2–2	2–2	1–0	0–3
Maine Road	4–0	1–0	6–1	2–0	2–1	1–0	0–1	1–3	3–0	2–3		1–1	0–1	4–1	2–0	1–2	4–0	2–1	3–0	6–1	3–1	2–1
Norton United	0–1	2–1	1–0	1–1	1–0	3–2	2–1	1–1	2–4	5–3	3–4		1–2	0–3	3–9	5–3	2–0	5–2	1–3	7–0	1–2	1–2
Padiham	1–1	0–1	1–2	4–1	2–2	3–0	1–1	2–0	2–1	2–1	3–4	4–0		2–4	1–1	6–0	5–4	4–1	4–0	4–0	2–0	3–4
Runcorn Linnets	0–1	2–1	2–2	3–2	5–1	1–1	3–2	2–0	2–4	0–1	1–3	1–0	0–0		1–1	6–1	3–2	4–2	2–1	2–2	3–0	1–3
Runcorn Town	0–2	1–3	3–2	4–1	2–0	2–2	1–2	2–2	4–3	3–2	3–0	2–0	1–0	2–1		3–0	5–0	1–1	8–1	10–1	2–0	0–1
Silsden	0–2	1–3	2–1	4–0	1–0	1–1	1–2	1–4	1–1	1–5	4–2	2–0	0–2	2–1	0–5		2–1	7–1	1–1	4–0	1–3	1–2
Squires Gate	0–2	2–3	3–3	3–2	0–2	0–2	0–4	3–1	1–3	2–2	2–1	1–2	0–2	0–1	1–4	1–1		3–0	2–0	0–1	0–1	2–2
St Helens Town	1–2	2–1	2–2	2–2	1–2	1–0	0–0	1–3	0–1	1–1	3–4	3–1	2–4	0–1	0–2	2–1	5–0		0–5	1–0	1–4	0–1
Stockport Sports	3–0	0–1	3–3	2–0	2–0	1–4	1–2	2–2	2–0	0–0	1–3	7–0	1–1	2–2	1–1	3–1	4–0	2–1		4–2	3–1	1–3
Stone Dominoes	2–4	0–6	1–4	0–4	2–3	0–9	0–1	0–7	1–6	3–2	1–4	1–2	0–1	1–3	0–3	3–2	0–3	1–3	2–2		0–8	0–6
Wigan Robin Pk	0–2	1–2	2–0	2–0	0–0	0–1	2–1	1–1	0–5	2–3	1–0	3–2	0–2	0–6	0–1	4–0	2–1	3–0	1–1	6–0		1–2
Winsford United	2–0	8–1	0–4	2–0	3–1	0–1	0–2	3–2	0–1	1–2	0–0	2–1	1–2	0–0	0–0	2–2	4–1	3–1	0–0	3–0	5–1	

Source: "Premier Division Results 2012/13". nwcfl.com.
Legend: Blue = home team win; Yellow = draw; Red = away team win.

=== Locations ===
Locations of the 2011–12 North West Counties Football League Premier Division teams

== First Division ==
North West Counties Football League First Division
- Season: 2012–13
- Teams: 18
- Champions: Formby
- Promoted: Abbey Hey; West Didsbury & Chorlton
- Relegated: None
- Matches: 306
- Goals: 1,112 (3.63 per match)
- Average attendance: 45

The First Division featured 18 teams, 16 remaining from the previous season plus 2 additions:

- Atherton Laburnum Rovers, relegated from the Premier Division
- West Didsbury & Chorlton, allocated to the division by the FA Leagues Committee, promoted from the Manchester League

During the season Formby were advised that their ground had failed a ground grading assessment and although at the end of the season they were league champions owing to the ruling they were not promoted. To maintain the numerical strength of the Premier Division two clubs were promoted: runners-up Abbey Hey and third placed West Didsbury & Chorlton (who were new to the league this season). No other clubs left the division.

=== League table ===
Pos	Team	Pld	W	D	L	GF	GA	GD	Pts	Season End Notes
1	Formby (C)	34	28	2	4	117	42	+75	86	Not Promoted (ground substandard)
2	Abbey Hey (P)	34	26	3	5	88	25	+63	81	Promoted to Premier Division
3	West Didsbury & Chorlton (P)	34	22	4	8	79	43	+36	70	Promoted to Premier Division
4	Atherton Collieries	34	21	6	7	78	47	+31	69	
5	AFC Darwen	34	20	3	11	79	57	+22	63	
6	Ashton Town	34	18	8	8	77	43	+34	62	
7	Cheadle Town	34	14	7	13	61	65	−4	49	
8	Oldham Boro	34	15	5	14	59	50	+9	47 (Note: Oldham Boro had 3 points deducted (breach of league rules))	
9	Rochdale Town	34	12	9	13	54	60	−6	45	
10	Nelson	34	11	9	14	64	76	−12	42	
11	Leek County School Old Boys	34	10	9	15	52	68	−16	39	
12	Chadderton	34	10	9	15	52	69	−17	39	
13	Atherton Laburnum Rovers	34	8	11	15	37	55	−18	35	
14	Irlam	34	9	6	19	47	72	−25	33	
15	Eccleshall	34	7	7	20	44	79	−35	28	
16	Daisy Hill	34	7	6	21	55	81	−26	27	
17	Holker Old Boys	34	7	2	25	31	74	−43	23	
18	Northwich Villa	34	6	4	24	38	106	−68	22	

Source: "Final Tables, Season 2012/13". nwcfl.com., "North West Counties League - North West Counties League Division One North: 2012 – 13: League Table". nonleaguematters.co.uk.
Rules for classification: 1) points; 2) goal difference; 3) number of goals scored.
(C) Champions; (P) Promoted

=== Results ===
Home \ Away	ABH	ADR	AST	ACO	ALR	CHA	CHT	DSH	ECC	FOR	HOB	IRL	LCS	NEL	NWV	OLD	RCH	WDC
Abbey Hey		3–0	2–1	0–1	2–1	5–1	3–1	2–0	1–0	1–1	5–0	2–1	5–2	5–1	3–0	0–1	0–2	2–1
AFC Darwen	0–4		3–2	1–1	2–1	2–1	2–1	3–1	1–0	1–3	3–0	0–1	3–1	3–2	6–0	0–2	1–2	2–0
Ashton Town	0–0	4–3		3–1	2–2	2–0	3–3	6–0	4–3	0–3	3–1	2–0	5–2	1–0	7–1	2–0	3–1	0–4
Atherton Colls	2–5	4–3	3–1		1–1	4–1	3–0	3–1	3–0	2–3	2–0	6–1	0–0	5–2	2–0	3–1	0–0	0–2
Atherton Lab. R	2–3	1–0	1–1	0–1		0–6	1–2	2–1	1–1	0–4	0–0	0–0	2–4	3–3	1–2	1–0	2–5	4–1
Chadderton	0–2	5–3	1–0	0–2	1–1		1–1	3–1	2–0	0–4	2–0	1–1	0–0	4–2	2–1	2–8	1–3	0–3
Cheadle Town	2–1	2–2	1–1	4–5	1–0	0–0		3–0	1–2	0–3	3–0	2–2	5–3	2–3	2–1	3–1	2–1	3–2
Daisy Hill	1–4	3–2	0–5	1–2	0–1	3–3	1–3		2–3	1–3	3–1	1–2	5–1	2–2	7–2	0–2	2–2	0–1
Eccleshall	0–4	1–3	2–6	5–2	1–1	2–3	0–2	2–2		1–7	1–0	2–3	1–1	1–1	0–1	0–7	1–4	0–1
Formby	0–2	3–3	2–1	3–2	2–0	5–0	6–0	4–3	9–3		3–0	3–1	1–0	3–2	9–0	1–3	3–0	0–1
Holker OB	0–7	1–4	0–1	1–5	1–0	0–0	3–0	1–4	0–2	2–3		0–2	0–1	4–0	3–0	4–2	1–2	1–3
Irlam	0–4	2–3	1–3	0–0	0–2	2–1	3–5	2–1	1–1	2–5	0–2		4–1	1–3	4–1	0–3	1–2	1–1
Leek CSOB	0–2	0–2	0–0	2–3	0–0	3–1	2–1	2–0	0–0	3–7	2–1	3–0		2–2	6–0	1–0	2–2	1–2
Nelson	1–3	1–2	1–1	0–3	5–2	1–1	3–1	0–2	0–4	1–6	3–0	5–1	2–1		4–1	1–0	3–2	2–2
Northwich Villa	1–2	2–4	0–5	1–3	1–2	2–5	0–3	2–2	2–1	0–3	4–0	0–4	1–3	2–2		1–2	0–3	2–0
Oldham Boro	0–0	1–3	1–0	1–1	1–0	2–1	2–2	1–2	1–0	1–2	1–0	1–0	3–1	1–2	3–3		3–3	2–4
Rochdale Town	0–3	0–6	0–1	0–2	0–0	1–1	1–0	3–3	0–3	4–0	0–4	3–2	0–0	2–2	2–3	3–1		1–2
W Didsbury & C	2–1	2–3	1–1	4–1	1–2	3–2	4–0	3–0	3–1	2–3	3–0	3–2	8–2	3–2	1–1	4–1	2–0	

Updated to match(es) played on complete "First Division Results 2012/13". nwcfl.com.. Source:
Legend: Blue = home team win; Yellow = draw; Red = away team win.

=== Locations ===
Locations of the 2011–12 North West Counties Football League First Division teams

== League Challenge Cup ==
The 2012–13 League Challenge Cup was a knockout competition open to all the league's 40 clubs. The final, played at Curzon Ashton F.C., was won 3–0 by Premier Division club Runcorn Linnets who defeated Formby of the First Division.

Quarter-finals, Semi-finals and Final

Quarter-finals
A.F.C. Blackpool (PD)	1
Maine Road (PD)	3
Bacup Borough (PD)	1 (Note: after extra time, score at 90 minutes: 1–1)
Formby (FD)	2
Runcorn Linnets (PD)	2
Bootle (PD)	1
Cheadle Town (FD)	2
A.F.C. Liverpool (PD)	1

Semi-finals
Maine Road (PD)	2 (Note: after extra time, score at 90 minutes: 2–2)	5p (Note: penalty shoot-out)
Formby (FD)	2	6p
Runcorn Linnets (PD)	3 (Note: after extra time, score at 90 minutes: 3–3)	4p (Note: penalty shoot-out)
Cheadle Town (FD)	3	2p

Final (Note: Played at Curzon Ashton F.C.)
Formby (FD)	0
Runcorn Linnets (PD)	3

Club's division appended to team name: (PD)=Premier Division; (FD)=First Division
source: "League Challenge Cup: 2012/2013 Season". nwcfl.com.

== First Division Trophy ==
The 2012–13 First Division Trophy was a knockout competition for the 18 First Division clubs only. The final held at Runcorn Linnets F.C. was won 1–0 by West Didsbury & Chorlton who defeated Abbey Hey.

The winners West Didsbury & Chorlton had originally been eliminated 3–1 at the quarter final stage by Ashton Town. However, after Ashton Town had subsequently beaten Daisy Hill 2–0 in the semi-finals (and named as finalists), they were found to have used an ineligible player in the quarter-final tie so were disqualified from the competition a week prior to the scheduled final. Both West Didsbury & Chorlton and Daisy Hill were reinstated to play a restaged semi-final with the former reaching the delayed final.

Semi-finals and Final

Semi-finals
Abbey Hey	2
AFC Darwen	0
West Didsbury & Chorlton	2
Daisy Hill	0

Final (Note: Played at Runcorn Linnets F.C.)
Abbey Hey	0
West Didsbury & Chorlton	1

source: "First Division Trophy: 2012/2013 Season". nwcfl.com.

== Reserves Section ==
Main honours for the 2012–13 season:

- Reserves Division
  - Winners: Padiham Reserves
  - Runners-up: Irlam Reserves
- Reserves Division Cup
  - Winners: Padiham Reserves
  - Runners-up: Cheadle Town Reserves
