= 2013–14 North West Counties Football League =

The 2013–14 North West Counties Football League season was the 32nd in the history of the North West Counties Football League, a football competition in England.

The league comprised two divisions, the Premier Division and the First Division (at levels 9 and 10 of the English football league system, Steps 5 and 6 of the National League System respectively). Additionally there were two cup competitions: the League Challenge Cup knockout competition open to all the league's clubs; and the First Division Trophy, a knockout trophy competition for First Division clubs only. For the final occasion this season after 32 seasons the league also had a reserves team section.

== Premier Division ==
North West Counties Football League Premier Division
- Season: 2013–14
- Teams: 22
- Champions: Norton United
- Promoted: Norton United
- Relegated: Wigan Robin Park
- Matches: 462
- Goals: 1,476 (3.19 per match)
- Average attendance: 108

The Premier Division featured 22 clubs, 20 remaining from the previous season plus two additions (both promoted from the First Division):

- Abbey Hey, promoted as runners-up
- West Didsbury & Chorlton, promoted from third position

Bacup Borough were renamed Bacup & Rossendale Borough

As in the previous season clubs had to register for promotion from the division using the following criteria: applied for promotion by 30 November 2013; pass a ground grading examination by 31 March 2014; finish the season in a position higher than that of any other team also achieving criteria 1 and 2; finish the season in one of the top three positions. The following eight teams from the division registered: A.F.C. Liverpool, Bootle, Congleton, Glossop North End, Maine Road, Norton United, Runcorn Linnets and Runcorn Town.

At the end of the season the champions Norton United were promoted to Northern Premier League Division One South. Bottom club Wigan Robin Park were relegated to First Division, As no club was to be relegated into the division next season the next-to-bottom club Bacup & Rossendale Borough were reprieved from relegation to the First Division.

=== League table ===
Pos	Team	Pld	W	D	L	GF	GA	GD	Pts	Season End Notes
1	Norton United (C, P)	42	32	4	6	101	38	+63	100	Promoted to Northern Premier; League Division One South
2	Runcorn Linnets	42	29	8	5	103	39	+64	95	
3	Glossop North End	42	25	8	9	73	33	+40	83	
4	Maine Road	42	24	9	9	85	42	+43	81	
5	Runcorn Town	42	25	4	13	87	45	+42	79	
6	Ashton Athletic	42	23	5	14	78	50	+28	74	
7	AFC Liverpool	42	21	7	14	88	54	+34	70	
8	Bootle	42	21	7	14	87	57	+30	70	
9	Colne	42	20	4	18	71	67	+4	64	
10	Congleton Town	42	17	9	16	58	58	0	60	
11	Stockport Sports	42	15	12	15	64	69	−5	57	
12	West Didsbury & Chorlton	42	15	8	19	52	66	−14	53	
13	AFC Blackpool	42	14	7	21	60	87	−27	49	
14	Winsford United	42	15	3	24	57	83	−26	48	
15	Silsden	42	13	8	21	52	70	−18	47	
16	Barnoldswick Town	42	12	7	23	59	89	−30	43	
17	St Helens Town	42	11	10	21	55	89	−34	43	
18	Alsager Town	42	11	7	24	57	85	−28	40	
19	Squires Gate	42	12	4	26	51	89	−38	40	
20	Abbey Hey	42	9	13	20	47	86	−39	40	
21	Bacup & Rossendale Borough	42	9	12	21	38	68	−30	39	Reprieved from relegation
22	Wigan Robin Park (R)	42	7	8	27	53	112	−59	29	Relegated to First Division

Source: "Final Tables, Season 2013/14". nwcfl.com., "North West Counties League - North West Counties League Premier Division: 2013 – 14: League Table". nonleaguematters.co.uk.
Rules for classification: 1) points; 2) goal difference; 3) number of goals scored.
(C) Champions; (P) Promoted; (R) Relegated

=== Results ===
Home \ Away	ABH	ABL	ALV	ALS	ASH	BAC	BWT	BTL	CLN	CON	GNE	MNR	NOR	RNL	RNT	SIL	SQG	STH	STS	WDC	WRP	WNS
Abbey Hey		0–2	2–2	4–2	2–0	1–1	1–1	0–4	1–4	0–0	1–3	2–2	2–1	1–2	1–3	2–1	0–3	1–1	0–3	2–1	0–1	2–1
AFC Blackpool	3–3		0–2	1–1	1–0	4–1	1–3	0–3	3–0	1–1	1–1	0–2	2–4	1–2	1–4	2–2	2–0	4–2	2–1	0–4	3–2	2–6
AFC Liverpool	4–0	2–4		5–1	1–1	4–0	2–0	3–0	4–2	1–0	0–2	1–2	2–3	2–3	0–4	3–1	2–1	3–0	1–1	2–2	6–0	1–2
Alsager Town	1–3	0–1	2–1		2–3	3–0	2–0	1–4	0–4	1–2	1–2	0–3	0–2	0–3	0–0	1–2	1–1	1–2	2–3	2–0	3–2	2–1
Ashton Athletic	3–1	6–1	0–1	3–0		0–0	3–0	1–0	1–0	0–1	2–1	1–2	2–0	1–0	1–3	1–1	1–2	6–2	2–1	2–2	4–0	6–2
Bacup & Ross. B	0–0	0–0	1–2	1–1	0–2		0–2	0–1	1–2	1–1	2–0	1–2	0–4	1–3	0–2	3–0	3–0	3–2	0–1	0–1	1–2	1–4
Barnoldswick T	3–1	1–2	2–1	1–1	1–2	1–1		2–3	1–0	1–1	0–2	2–3	1–1	1–5	0–2	2–1	4–0	1–2	1–2	5–2	2–2	2–1
Bootle	5–0	2–1	0–1	2–0	1–0	0–0	4–0		4–0	2–0	3–1	2–1	0–4	2–1	2–2	2–0	2–4	1–2	2–2	5–0	5–0	0–1
Colne	2–0	2–0	0–4	4–3	1–0	1–1	1–2	2–1		2–1	0–0	0–1	0–1	1–6	0–3	3–1	4–0	7–0	3–2	0–4	3–1	5–1
Congleton Town	3–1	4–2	1–0	2–3	3–2	0–1	3–1	2–1	3–1		0–2	3–3	0–2	0–4	4–2	2–1	0–2	1–0	2–3	3–1	1–1	3–0
Glossop NE	0–0	3–1	2–1	4–1	1–2	2–0	2–0	2–1	1–1	3–2		0–1	0–1	1–1	1–0	3–0	5–1	2–3	0–3	1–0	5–0	5–0
Maine Road	3–0	3–1	0–1	2–0	2–0	1–0	7–0	0–0	3–0	2–0	1–1		2–2	0–0	2–1	1–2	1–2	6–0	1–1	5–1	1–1	3–0
Norton United	2–0	2–0	3–1	4–2	1–2	4–0	4–0	2–1	2–1	3–1	0–1	3–0		0–2	4–1	2–0	4–2	2–1	2–1	1–0	5–1	2–1
Runcorn Linnets	7–1	4–0	1–3	4–2	4–0	1–1	3–1	3–1	3–4	1–1	2–1	2–2	1–5		4–0	1–0	3–0	1–1	2–1	0–0	3–2	2–1
Runcorn Town	1–3	1–2	4–1	0–3	2–1	4–1	4–1	4–1	1–2	3–0	0–0	4–1	1–2	0–1		3–0	2–0	2–0	3–1 (Note: Runcorn Town v Stockport Sports: Match abandoned after 83 minutes. Score at time of abandonment stands.)	0–1	1–1	1–0
Silsden	2–2	4–1	3–1	3–2	0–1	1–2	3–1	0–2	1–3	0–0	0–1	1–3	1–0	1–1	0–4		5–1	1–0	2–2	2–0	1–0	2–1
Squires Gate	2–2	1–3	1–1	1–2	0–1	3–3	4–0	1–4	2–1	0–2	0–1	1–2	1–2	0–4	0–1	3–2		3–0	1–2	1–0	0–2	2–1
St Helens Town	2–1	1–1	1–1	0–3	2–6	1–1	1–1	1–2	0–1	1–1	0–2	0–5	3–3	0–3	0–3	2–0 (Note: St Helens Town v Silsden: Match abandoned after 86 minutes. Score at time of abandonment stands.)	5–0		2–2	3–0	4–1	0–2
Stockport Sports	1–1	2–1	1–4	2–1	0–3	0–2	0–3	5–5	1–0	0–2	0–0	2–1	1–3	0–3	1–2	1–1	3–0	1–1		2–3	1–1	2–1
W Didsbury & C	2–0	2–0	1–3	0–0	1–1	0–1	3–2	4–3	1–1	1–0	1–3	0–2	0–0	0–2	1–0	2–0	2–1	1–2	2–2		1–0	1–2
Wigan Robin P	1–1	3–1	0–8	2–3	2–4	4–1	3–2	3–3	0–2	1–2	0–3	3–1	1–5	0–1	1–5	1–1	2–3	1–4	0–2	3–4		1–3
Winsford United	1–2	0–2	0–0	1–1	3–1	1–2	3–5	1–1	2–1	1–0	0–3	1–0	0–4	0–4	0–4	2–3	2–1	2–1	1–2	2–0	3–1	

Source: "Premier Division Results 2013/14". nwcfl.com.
Legend: Blue = home team win; Yellow = draw; Red = away team win.

=== Locations ===
Locations of the 2013–14 North West Counties Football League Premier Division teams

== First Division ==
North West Counties Football League First Division
- Season: 2013–14
- Teams: 19
- Champions: Nelson
- Promoted: Nelson; 1874 Northwich
- Matches: 342
- Goals: 1,327 (3.88 per match)
- Average attendance: 78

First Division featured 19 teams, 16 remaining from the previous season plus 3 additions allocated to the division by the FA Leagues Committee:

- Hanley Town, promoted as champions of the Staffordshire County Senior League Premier Division
- 1874 Northwich, a newly formed club
- Widnes Vikings, from the West Cheshire League Third Division, where they had played as Widnes Town

Northwich Villa changed their name to Northwich Flixton Villa

At the end of the season second placed Formby folded so per National League System rules the third-placed club 1874 Northwich (new to the league this season) along with the champions Nelson were promoted to the Premier Division. Nelson who scored 135 goals from 36 league matches became the second highest First Division (formerly Division Two) goalscoring team over a season (exceeded only by Cammell Laird with 142 from 36 matches in Division Two 2004–05). One further club left the division, fifteenth placed Leek County School Old Boys resigned and joined the Staffordshire County Senior League.

=== League table ===
Pos	Team	Pld	W	D	L	GF	GA	GD	Pts	Season End Notes
1	Nelson (C, P)	36	29	2	5	135	51	+84	89	Promoted to Premier Division
2	Formby	36	26	6	4	97	37	+60	84	Folded at end of season
3	1874 Northwich (P)	36	26	6	4	79	28	+51	84	Promoted to Premier Division
4	Hanley Town	36	23	4	9	86	55	+31	73	
5	Atherton Collieries	36	19	9	8	100	62	+38	66	
6	Holker Old Boys	36	17	9	10	80	60	+20	60	
7	Rochdale Town	36	17	4	15	95	78	+17	55	
8	Atherton Laburnum Rovers	36	17	3	16	66	66	0	54	
9	AFC Darwen	36	15	7	14	64	64	0	51 (Note: AFC Darwen and Widnes Vikings had 1 point deducted (for a breach of league rules))	
10	Irlam	36	14	8	14	53	64	−11	50	
11	Cheadle Town	36	14	7	15	65	74	−9	46 (Note: Cheadle Town, Chadderton and Northwich Flixton Villa had 3 points deducted (for a breach of league rules))	
12	Ashton Town	36	11	11	14	57	61	−4	44	
13	Chadderton	36	12	8	16	58	71	−13	41	
14	Widnes Vikings	36	9	9	18	58	84	−26	35	
15	Leek County School Old Boys	36	8	5	23	55	93	−38	29	Resigned to the Staffordshire; County Senior League
16	Oldham Boro	36	7	7	22	45	90	−45	28	
17	Eccleshall	36	7	5	24	43	78	−35	26	
18	Daisy Hill	36	6	4	26	43	103	−60	22	
19	Northwich Flixton Villa	36	6	4	26	48	108	−60	19	

Source: "Final Tables, Season 2013/14". nwcfl.com., "North West Counties League - North West Counties League Division One North: 2013 – 14: League Table". nonleaguematters.co.uk.
Rules for classification: 1) points; 2) goal difference; 3) number of goals scored.
(C) Champions; (P) Promoted

=== Results ===
Home \ Away	18N	ADR	AST	ACO	ALR	CHA	CHT	DSH	ECC	FOR	HAN	HOB	IRL	LCS	NEL	NFV	OLD	RCH	WDV
1874 Northwich		4–1	1–0	1–1	3–0	3–0	4–0	3–0	2–1	0–1	4–2	6–0	0–0	1–0	1–3	1–0	1–1	2–1	4–0
AFC Darwen	1–4		1–0	3–3	1–3	3–0	1–1	2–0	3–2	2–5	1–2	4–2	2–1	5–2	1–3	5–0	2–3	0–0	1–0
Ashton Town	0–5	0–1		1–3	1–2	0–0	4–1	2–2	4–3	2–2	0–1	0–0	1–1	4–0	1–2	1–2	4–1	2–2	2–1
Atherton Colls	0–1	2–2	2–1		0–0	3–1	6–2	5–0	6–0	2–2	2–2	2–3	4–2	4–0	2–1	3–3	3–1	2–4	5–1
Atherton Lab. R	1–3	1–3	3–1	3–1		2–1	4–1	1–2	2–0	1–3	4–3	3–1	2–0	1–6	2–3	5–1	0–1	0–5	2–0
Chadderton	1–3	3–0	3–1	1–2	3–2		1–2	1–0	4–1	0–2	0–1	1–1	2–2	3–2	1–7	6–3	4–1	0–3	2–2
Cheadle Town	2–2	0–4	1–1	2–2	1–1	2–0		5–1	3–1	1–4	1–4	4–1	4–2	0–0	2–3	1–2	2–0	1–0	5–2
Daisy Hill	2–3	1–4	2–2	3–1	1–2	0–0	0–2		2–1	1–3	1–7	2–3	0–2	2–3	3–4	4–1	3–5	2–1	1–1
Eccleshall	0–2	2–1	0–1	1–2	2–1	1–3	1–3	1–2		2–3	1–2	2–2	0–1	1–0	1–6	2–1	2–0	1–1	1–1
Formby	0–0	2–0	0–1	1–0	3–0	1–0	3–0	7–1	4–0		2–1	2–2	4–1	7–3	1–3	2–0	3–1	2–1	1–2
Hanley Town	1–2	1–4	0–3	1–5	2–1	2–2	5–3	3–0	1–0	1–1		2–3	3–0	4–0	3–0	2–1	3–0	1–0	3–2
Holker OB	0–1	4–0	0–1	2–2	1–1	4–1	4–1	4–1	2–3	0–1	1–1		2–1	5–1	1–2	2–0	4–1	6–3	3–1
Irlam	1–1	2–0	1–1	1–3	1–2	3–1	1–0	3–1	2–1	1–1	0–3	2–2		0–3	0–2	4–1	1–1	3–2	1–0
Leek CSOB	1–2	0–0	0–1	1–3	2–6	1–4	3–3	3–1	2–2	1–5	0–2	1–3	1–2		0–4	6–1	6–1	1–3	1–1
Nelson	3–1	4–0	5–1	4–2	5–1	2–2	2–1	8–0	1–0	0–4	3–4	3–2	2–5	7–0		2–2	8–4	6–1	8–1
Northwich Fl. V	0–1	1–2	4–4	2–5	0–4	2–3	3–1	2–1	1–0	0–6	5–1	0–3	2–4	0–2	0–3		0–1	3–4	1–5
Oldham Boro	0–1	0–0	3–4	0–2	2–1	0–1	1–2	2–1	1–1	2–3	1–3	2–2	0–1	2–1	0–6	2–2		0–2	2–2
Rochdale Town	4–3	4–2	3–2	8–6	1–2	6–2	0–2	2–0	4–5	4–2	0–5	2–3	7–0	2–0	1–4	7–2	4–1		2–2
Widnes Vikings	0–3	2–2	3–3	1–4	2–0	1–1	1–3	4–0	2–1	1–4	2–4	0–2	3–1	1–2	0–6	3–0	5–2	3–1	

Source: "First Division Results 2013/14". nwcfl.com.
Legend: Blue = home team win; Yellow = draw; Red = away team win.

=== Locations ===
Locations of the 2013–14 North West Counties Football League First Division teams

== League Challenge Cup ==
The 2013–14 League Challenge Cup was a knockout competition open to all the league's 41 clubs. The final, contested by Premier Division clubs and played at Curzon Ashton F.C., was won 1–0 by Ashton Athletic who defeated Maine Road.

=== First round ===
All the 22 Premier Division clubs together with Ashton Town of the First Division received a bye to the second round.

(Appended to club names in the results listings below: '(PD)'=Premier Division club; '(FD)'=First Division club)

Home team (division)	Score	Away team (division)
1874 Northwich (FD)	3–2 (a.e.t.) (90min: 1–1)	Hanley Town (FD)
Atherton Collieries (FD)	4–0	Cheadle Town (FD)
Atherton Laburnum Rovers (FD)	1–2	AFC Darwen (FD)
Daisy Hill (FD)	0–4	Irlam (FD)
Formby (FD)	4–0	Nelson (FD)
Holker Old Boys (FD)	2–0	Leek CSOB (FD)
Northwich Flixton Villa (FD)	4–5 (a.e.t.) (90min: 4–4) (Note: Played at Eccleshall F.C.)	Eccleshall (FD)
Oldham Boro (FD)	1–2 (Note: Played at Chadderton F.C.)	Chadderton (FD)
Rochdale Town (FD)	3–0	Widnes Vikings (FD)

=== Second round ===
Home team (division)	Score	Away team (division)
Abbey Hey (PD)	4–0	Eccleshall (FD)
AFC Darwen (FD)	4–2 (a.e.t.) (90min: 1–1)	Colne (PD)
Atherton Collieries (FD)	6–0	Bacup & Rossendale Borough (PD)
Bootle (PD)	3–0	Norton United (PD)
Chadderton (FD)	0–1	Ashton Athletic (PD)
Congleton Town (PD)	2–0	Ashton Town (FD)
Glossop North End (PD)	0–2	Maine Road (PD)
Irlam (FD)	1–5	Runcorn Town (PD)
Rochdale Town (FD)	3–2	Holker Old Boys (FD)
Runcorn Linnets (PD)	1–0	Barnoldswick Town (PD)
Silsden (PD)	1–4 (a.e.t.) (90min: 1–1)	Formby (FD)
Squires Gate (PD)	1–5	1874 Northwich (FD)
St Helens Town (PD)	1–2	Alsager Town (PD)
West Didsbury & Chorlton (PD)	1–5	A.F.C. Liverpool (PD)
Wigan Robin Park (PD)	2–3	A.F.C. Blackpool (PD)
Winsford United (PD)	3–1	Stockport Sports (PD)

=== Third round ===
Home team (division)	Score	Away team (division)
1874 Northwich (FD)	1–0 (Note: Played at Widnes Vikings F.C.)	Formby (FD)
A.F.C. Blackpool (PD)	1–0	A.F.C. Liverpool (PD)
Alsager Town (PD)	0–1	Runcorn Linnets (PD)
Bootle (PD)	0–1	Abbey Hey (PD)
Congleton Town (PD)	1–1 (a.e.t.) (90min: 1–1)	Ashton Athletic (PD)
Maine Road (PD)	3–0	Winsford United (PD)
Rochdale Town (FD)	3–0 (Note: Played at Atherton Collieries F.C.)	Atherton Collieries (FD)
Runcorn Town (PD)	5–0	AFC Darwen (FD)
Replay
Ashton Athletic (PD)	2–1	Congleton Town (PD)

=== Quarter-finals ===
Home team (division)	Score	Away team (division)
1874 Northwich (FD)	2–1	Abbey Hey (PD)
Maine Road (PD)	4–0	A.F.C. Blackpool (PD)
Rochdale Town (FD)	3–1 (Note: Played at Runcorn Town F.C.)	Runcorn Town (PD)
Runcorn Linnets (PD)	0–2	Ashton Athletic (PD)

=== Semi–Finals ===
The semi-finals were decided on aggregate score from two legs played

Tie	Home team (division)	Score	Away team (division)
1	Maine Road (PD)	3–1	1874 Northwich (FD)
1	1874 Northwich (FD)	0–3	Maine Road (PD)
1	Maine Road won 6–1 on aggregate		
2	Rochdale Town (FD)	1–3	Ashton Athletic (PD)
2	Ashton Athletic (PD)	3–1	Rochdale Town (FD)
2	Ashton Athletic won 6–2 on aggregate		

=== Final ===
Team (division)	Score	Team (division)
Played at Curzon Ashton F.C., Tameside Stadium
Ashton Athletic (PD)	1–0	Maine Road (PD)

source: "League Challenge Cup: 2013/2014 Season". nwcfl.com.

== First Division Trophy ==
The 2013–14 First Division Trophy was a knockout competition for the 19 First Division clubs only. In the final held at Runcorn Linnets F.C. the trophy was won for the second time in their history by Formby (who disbanded six weeks later): they defeated Hanley Town 5–3 on penalties after the match had finished 3–3 after extra time (score at 90 minutes: 2–2). It was only the second occasion a club had won the trophy twice (previously by A.F.C. Liverpool in 2010).

=== First round ===
Six clubs were drawn into first round ties, the remaining 13 received a bye to the second round.

Home team	Score	Away team
Daisy Hill	0–3	Nelson
Eccleshall	2–4	Hanley Town
Formby	2–0	Atherton Collieries

=== Second round ===
Home team	Score	Away team
1874 Northwich	5–0	Widnes Vikings
AFC Darwen	3–2	Cheadle Town
Formby	2–2 (a.e.t.) (90min: 2–2) (3–0 p)	Atherton Laburnum Rovers
Hanley Town	1–0	Chadderton
Holker Old Boys	1–0	Rochdale Town
Leek CSOB	1–1 (a.e.t.) (90min: 1–1) (4–3 p) (Note: Played at Northwich Flixton Villa F.C.)	Northwich Flixton Villa
Nelson	6–1	Irlam
Oldham Boro	0–3 (Note: Played at Ashton Town F.C.)	Ashton Town

=== Quarter-finals ===
Home team	Score	Away team
Ashton Town	1–4	Hanley Town
Formby	4–2	1874 Northwich
Leek CSOB	2–7	AFC Darwen
Nelson	0–1 (a.e.t.) (90min: 0–0)	Holker Old Boys

=== Semi-finals ===
The semi-finals were decided on aggregate score from two legs played

Tie	Home team	Score	Away team
1	Hanley Town	3–1	Holker Old Boys
1	Holker Old Boys	3–2	Hanley Town
1	Hanley Town won 5–4 on aggregate		
2	AFC Darwen	3–2	Formby
2	Formby	4–1 (a.e.t.) (90min: 2–1)	AFC Darwen
2	Formby won 6–4 on aggregate		

=== Final ===
Team	Score	Team
Played at Runcorn Linnets F.C., Millbank Linnets Stadium
Formby	3–3 (a.e.t.) (90min: 2–2)	Atherton Laburnum Rovers
Formby won 5–3 on penalties

source: "First Division Trophy: 2013/2014 Season". nwcfl.com.

== Reserves Section ==
This was the final season that the league operated a reserves section. Main honours for the 2013–14 season:

- Reserves Division
  - Winners: Glossop North End Reserves
  - Runners-up: New Mills Reserves
- Reserves Division Cup
  - Winners: AFC Darwen Reserves
  - Runners-up: Irlam
