= Runcorn Town F.C. =

Unincorporated football club in England

Runcorn Town
- Full name: Runcorn Town Football Club
- Nickname: Town
- Founded: 1967; 59 years ago (as Mond Rangers)
- Ground: Viridor Community Stadium; Sandy Lane, Runcorn, WA7 4ET
- Capacity: 1,530
- Coordinates: 53.3304°N 2.7506°W
- Chairman: Alan Bennett
- Manager: Liam Page
- League: Midland League Premier Division
- 2025–26: North West Counties League Division One South, 1st of 18 (promoted)
- Website: http://www.runcorntown.co.uk/
Home colours	Away colours

Runcorn Town Football Club is an English association football club based in Runcorn, Cheshire, England. After spending most of their years in the West Cheshire League, they were elected to the North West Counties League in 2010 and are currently in Midland League Premier Division. Their home ground is Viridor Community Stadium in Runcorn. Runcorn Town also has a youth team, veterans' team and an under 8s team.

== History ==
=== Runcorn Sunday League: 1967 to 1974 ===
Runcorn Town were formed in 1967 under the name of CKD and played in the Runcorn Sunday League. They changed their name to Mond FC in 1970, but little is known about the club's early years. At the start of the 1974–75 season, they made the decision to try Saturday football in the Warrington & District Football League.

=== Warrington and District Football League: 1974 to 1984 ===
At the end of their first season, Mond amalgamated with Premier Division team ICI Weston, becoming Mond Rangers. They remained in the Warrington & District Football League until 1984–85 when they were elected to join the West Cheshire League Division Two, but the link was maintained with the WDL with a reserve team setup. Les Walsh was leading goal scorer with 32 goals including 3 hat tricks

=== West Cheshire Football League: 1984 to 2010 ===
Mond Rangers established themselves as a solid mid-table team and it was not until the 1991–92 season that they won their first silverware as they won the West Cheshire Bowl as well as finishing a respectable sixth-place finish in Division 2. The following season they finished third in the league and reached the Bowl final, and improved again the following season by finishing third in the league, and regaining the Bowl.

Promotion was achieved in 1994–95 when they finished second in the league. They also reached the Final of the Cheshire Amateur Cup but lost 2–1 to Poulton Victoria in a match played at Prenton Park, Tranmere. Apart from a 5th-placed finish in 1996–97, the club were perennial strugglers in Division One, and were relegated for the first time in their history in 2001–02.

The 2004–05 season saw success return to the club with the first team finishing as runners up in Division Two, winning the Runcorn Senior Cup and reaching the final of the Cheshire Bowl again.

Before the start of the 2005–06 season, the club changed their name to Runcorn Town. A decision was also taken to improve facilities at the club with a view to joining the North West Counties League, but the club suffered a heartbreaking relegation at the end of this season, slipping into the relegation zone for the first time on the last day of the season.

The following season the club won Division Two for the first time in the club's history and were promoted. The 2007–08 season was probably the most successful in the club's history. The club won the Runcorn Cup, were runners up in the Pyke Cup, and finished third in Division 1, which remains the club's joint highest ever finish. They followed this with a 4th-place finish in 2008–09 and another third-place finish in 2009–10.

In June 2010 the club, having added floodlights to their home ground, applied to join the North West Counties Football League and after approval from the league and The Football Association officially joined after the League's AGM in mid June.

=== North West Counties Football League: 2010 to present ===
In their opening match in Division One in August 2010 they beat Abbey Hey 5–1 with Marvin Molyneux scoring Town's first ever goal in the league after just three minutes.

The first season was a real success, with the club losing just two of their 34 league matches. Promotion to the Premier Division was achieved at the first attempt following a 2–0 victory at Pavilions against Chadderton, and they finished the season as runners up in the league. They finished the season on a club record run of 25 league games without defeat.

In their first season in the Premier Division, Runcorn Town continued their success by finishing as runners up behind Ramsbottom United.

The subsequent seasons saw Town struggle to recapture past form in the NWCFL Premier Division, finishing 4th, 5th and 13th twice in successive seasons, although they established themselves somewhat as a Cup team. Continued success in the FA Vase seen them reach at least the second round in every season entered, whilst in 2014–15 they reached the third qualifying round of the FA Cup for the first time, famously winning at Conference North side Barrow.

2016 brought the appointment of Chris Herbert as manager after Simon Burton left the club after a seven-year period. It was difficult to get a squad together, with only one player retained from the previous season. There were no real cup runs this year, but Town came back in the league to finish third, level on points with runners-up Bootle.

The 2017–18 season saw the club get off to a record breaking start as they won their first 11 games of the season, with the first defeat coming in November. But the bad weather over winter saw momentum halted, playing just once in 35 days, and in ten league games until February, Town picked up just seven points. The end to the season was almost as good as the start, but they left themselves too much to do and finished third once more, albeit with a club record 93 points.

The 2018–19 season saw Runcorn Town in and among the leading sides until Christmas, but midway through the season, Herbert left the club to take a full time role at National League side Salford City. Midfielder Paul McManus accepted the role on a caretaker basis, and was appointed as permanent player-manager prior to the final game of the season.

The 2019–20 season was declared null and void after the season was cancelled due to the worldwide COVID-19 pandemic. The final game of the season was a 5–0 win at home to Burscough on 14 March 2020. Success continued in the FA Cup until losing to Farsley Celtic in the 2nd qualifying round. In the League Cup, Town progressed to the semi-final before the competition was cancelled.

The 2020–21 season barely got started before again being curtailed due to the COVID-19 pandemic. In one of the few games played, Town beat AFC Liverpool on penalties following a thrilling 3–3 draw to reach the final of the League Cup.

The League Cup final was played at the beginning of the 2021–22 season, with Town losing 6–3 to 1874 Northwich. In October 2021 a new management team was brought in – Niall McGuinness and Aden Shannon taking over as joint managers, lasting just six months in charge with the club being relegated to Division 1 North.

A new management team led by Matt Barnes were brought in for the start of the 2022–23 season, tasked with building a new squad to challenge for promotion back to the Premier Division. Barnes resigned in November and Karl Brown and Lee Bignell were brought in to put together another new squad. At the end of the 2022–23 season, Runcorn Town faced the possibility of relegation to step 7 of the non-league system. However, despite finishing second from last in the division, and conceding the second most goals in the division, in May 2023 it was announced Runcorn Town have been handed a reprieve from relegation due to the team having one of the better points per game ratios of all second to last placing clubs across the country.

The 2023-24 season was a bit of a mixed bag with some entertaining high scoring wins as well as long periods without a win. Some promising early results included some memorable wins against Bacup Borough (4-3), Darwen FC (5-4) and Route One Rovers (5-3). A tough winter period saw the club drop down the table and despite just two wins after Christmas the team had done enough to improve on the previous season, finishing 12th and 6 points above the relegation zone.

2024-25 saw a move to The North West Counties League Division One South. Karl Brown began the season in charge alongside Nathan Steele who had replaced Lee Bignell. Just three games into the season though Brown was relieved of his duties with Steele taking over a Manager for the next three games. On 16th August a new management team was brought in led by Chris Jones who joined from CPD Porthmadog. After overseeing two games Chris resigned and the club moved quickly to appoint Darren Moore and Liam Page as Managers on 22nd August. Darren and Liam's first win game in their fourth game against Stockport Georgians was the club's first points of the season in the 11th game! The duo gradually turned around the club's fortunes and rebuilt the squad and the team climbed the table finishing in 12th place, 9 points above the relegation zone.

The 2025-26 season was the best ever for the club, winning three trophies. Town won the North West Counties League Division One South, finishing 15 points ahead of the second place Eccleshall and with just one defeat. There was success in the cup competitions and in addition to the league title they also won the Edward Case Cup (beating Darwen FC in the final at Euxton Villa) and the First Division Champions Cup (beating Nelson 3-1 at the Viridor Community Stadium.

In the County Cups Town progressed further than ever before. In the Cheshire Senior Cup Final they were beaten 5-2 by Crewe Alexandra at the Mornflake Stadium. In the Liverpool Senior Cup they reached the semi-final where they were beaten 3-1 by neighbours Runcorn Linnets.

== Cup competitions ==
=== FA Cup ===
The club entered the FA Cup for the first time in the 2011–12 season, and played their first ever match in the competition in the Extra preliminary round on 20 August 2011 at home to Northern Counties East Football League Premier Division side Brighouse Town. Town won 4–1 with Scott Burton becoming the club's first ever goalscorer in the competition.

The club's best performance in the competition came in the 2014–15 season when they reached the third qualifying round before losing 5–2 at home to Northern Premier League Division 1 south side Norton United. In the previous second qualifying round, Runcorn Town had beaten National League North leaders Barrow 1–0 at Holker Street.

=== FA Vase ===
The club entered the FA Vase for the first time in the 2010–11 season, and played their first ever match in the competition in the second qualifying round on 18 September 2010 away at Northern Counties East Football League Premier Division side Parkgate, having received a bye in the first qualifying round. James McShane scored Runcorn Town's first ever goal in the competition with Town performing winning 3–1.

The club's best performance in the competition came in the 2012–13 season when they reached the fifth round proper before losing 2–1 (after extra time) at home to Midland Football Alliance league side Walsall Wood.

=== Cheshire Senior Cup ===
The 2010–11 season was also Town's debut in the Cheshire Senior Cup. Having got a bye in the first round, they entertained Northern Premier League Division One North side Warrington Town in the second round. Despite a two league gap between the sides, Town drew 1–1 after extra time, before losing 4–2 on penalties.

One notable game in the competition came in the 2011–12 season which saw Runcorn Town drawn away at Northern Premier League side Woodley Sports in the first round. The game was notable as it was the first competitive game that the club had played on a synthetic playing surface. Three goals in the second half of extra time saw Town lose 4–1 after a 1–1 draw in 90 minutes.

In the 2025-26 season Town reached the Cheshire Senior Cup Final. They received a bye in the First Round, before beating Stockport Georgians on penalties. Opposition from higher divisions were then defeated with a win at Stockport Town, before a home semi-final win against Vauxhall Motors. In the final Town were beaten 5-2 by Crewe Alexandra at the Mornflake Stadium.

=== Liverpool Senior Cup ===
The club entered the Liverpool Senior Cup for the first time in the 2019–20 season. Having received a bye in the first round, Litherland REMYCA F.C. were defeated 4–1 in the second round. The quarter-final saw a young Tranmere Rovers F.C. run out 2–0 winners at the Viridor Community Stadium.

In the 2025-26 season they reached the semi-final. After beating AFC Liverpool on penalties following a 3-3 draw Town should have faced Southport or City of Liverpoool, but both teams were removed from the competition. That set up a memorable quarter final win away to National League North side Marine. In the semi-final, Town were beaten 3-1 by neighbours Runcorn Linnets.

== Honours ==
=== League ===
- North West Counties Football League, First Division South - Champions: 2025–26
- North West Counties Football League, Premier Division – Runners-Up: 2011–12
- North West Counties Football League, Division 1 – Runners-Up: 2010–11
- North West Counties Football League, Macron Cup – Runners-Up: 2019–20
- West Cheshire League, Division 2 – Champions: 2006–07. Runners-Up: 2004–05, 1994–95

=== Cup ===
- Cheshire Amateur Cup – Runners-Up: 1994–95
- Pyke Cup – Runners-Up: 2007–08
- West Cheshire Bowl – Winners: 1991–92, 1993–94. Runners-Up: 1992–93, 2004–05
- Bill Weight Memorial Trophy – Winners: 1995–96, 2005–06, 2007–08
- Runcorn Senior Cup – Winners: 2004–05, 2005–06, 2007–08. Runners-Up: 2009–10
- North West Counties Football League, Edward Case Cup - Winners: 2025–26
- North West Counties Football League, First Division Champions Cup - Winners: 2025–26

== Players ==
=== Current squad ===
Note: Flags indicate national team as defined under FIFA eligibility rules; some limited exceptions apply. Players may hold more than one non-FIFA nationality.

No.	Pos.	Nation	Player
—	GK		Will Ebbrell
—	DF		Will Avon
—	DF		Sam Flower
—	DF		Charlie Harland
—	DF		Alex Jones
—	DF		Gary Robinson
—	MF		Ed Burthem
—	MF		Jorge Dwyer
—	MF		Eneil Gumbs

No.	Pos.	Nation	Player
—	MF		Liam Kennington
—	MF		Carl Rogers
—	MF		Tom Shaw
—	FW		Kieran Alley
—	FW		Jamie Apperley
—	FW		Shaquille Lewys
—	FW		Ethan Mercer
—	FW		Orran Mushet
—	FW		Connor Spiers

=== Notable former players ===
James McShane scored 163 goals in 288 appearances between 2007 and 2016.

Craig Cairns scored 133 goals in 142 appearances between 2016 and 2022.

Nick Haughton made 14 appearances during the 2013/14 season before joining Fleetwood Town. He played in the Football League with Fleetwood and also won the FA Trophy at Wembley with AFC Fylde in 2019.

Tom Crawford made 6 appearances on loan from Chester during the 2017/18 season. He joined League 2 side Notts County in 2018, before moving on to Hartlepool United in 2020.

Mark McGregor made 36 appearances between 2016 and 2018 and was also Assistant Manager. He has a wealth of experience in the Football League with Wrexham, Burnley, Blackpool and Port Vale.

Louis Moss made 3 appearances in 2017. He also has 8 caps for Barbados.

Kevin Ellison made 14 appearances during the 2023/24 season. He has many years of experience in professional football having played in the Premier League as well as over 500 Football League appearances.

== Management ==
Position	Name
Manager	Liam Page
Coach	Dean Kennington
Coach	Nick Harland
Coach	Alan Knell
Coach	Gary Robinson
Coach / Physio	Dean Smith

== League history ==
Season	Division	P	W	D	L	F	A	Pts	Pos	Significant Events
Formed in 1967 as CKD. Renamed Mond in 1970.
1967–74	Runcorn Sunday League	League Tables Unknown								
Joined Warrington and District Football League
1974–75	Warrington and District Football League Division 5	26	23	1	2	127	36	47	02/18	
Amalgamated with ICI Weston. Changed name to Mond Rangers
1975–76	Warrington and District League Premier Division	30	10	7	13	53	56	27	10/16	
1976–77	Warrington and District League Premier Division	26	5	8	13	30	49	18	11/14	
1977–78	Warrington and District League Premier Division	26	11	7	8	50	58	29	05/14	
1978–79	Warrington and District League Premier Division	26	8	6	12	37	54	22	11/14	
1979–80	Warrington and District League Premier Division	30	11	6	13	57	70	28	08/16	
1980–81	Warrington and District League Premier Division	32	8	10	14	51	65	26	11/17	
1981–82	Warrington and District League Premier Division	30	11	5	14	50	57	27	10/16	
1982–83	Warrington and District League Premier Division	28	8	3	14	44	58	22	12/15	
1983–84	Warrington and District League Premier Division	28	11	3	14	44	54	25	10/15	
Joined West Cheshire League
1984–85	West Cheshire League Division Two	34	15	9	10	73	62	39	07/18	
1985–86	West Cheshire League Division Two	34	13	9	12	73	71	35	10/18	
1986–87	West Cheshire League Division Two	34	10	8	16	64	86	28	12/18	
1987–88	West Cheshire League Division Two	34	13	7	14	73	69	33	10/18	
1988–89	West Cheshire League Division Two	34	6	15	13	48	65	27	14/18	
1989–90	West Cheshire League Division Two	34	15	7	12	78	62	37	09/18	
1990–91	West Cheshire League Division Two	34	17	4	13	56	55	38	06/18	
1991–92	West Cheshire League Division Two	34	14	8	12	67	61	36	06/18	
1992–93	West Cheshire League Division Two	34	21	6	7	89	43	48	03/18	
1993–94	West Cheshire League Division Two	34	22	6	6	100	42	50	03/18	
1994–95	West Cheshire League Division Two	34	25	2	7	118	39	52	02/18	Promoted
1995–96	West Cheshire League Division One	30	7	7	16	39	68	21	15/16	
1996–97	West Cheshire League Division One	30	15	6	9	55	54	36	05/16	
1997–98	West Cheshire League Division One	30	10	4	16	57	60	34	12/16	
1998–99	West Cheshire League Division One	30	8	5	17	48	76	29	13/16	
1999–2000	West Cheshire League Division One	30	9	4	17	52	75	31	12/16	
2000–01	West Cheshire League Division One	30	9	6	15	39	57	33	14/16	
2001–02	West Cheshire League Division One	30	2	6	22	30	85	12	16/16	Relegated
2002–03	West Cheshire League Division Two	30	7	5	18	39	70	26	14/16	
2003–04	West Cheshire League Division Two	30	13	6	11	73	52	45	06/16	
2004–05	West Cheshire League Division Two	30	22	3	5	81	28	69	02/16	Promoted
Changed name to Runcorn Town FC
2005–06	West Cheshire League Division One	30	8	5	17	49	66	29	15/16	Relegated
2006–07	West Cheshire League Division Two	30	21	5	4	92	33	68	01/16	Champions
2007–08	West Cheshire League Division One	32	21	3	8	94	41	66	03/17	
2008–09	West Cheshire League Division One	28	14	8	6	69	35	50	04/15	
2009–10	West Cheshire League Division One	30	21	5	4	87	30	68	03/16	Promoted
Joined North West Counties League
2010–11	North West Counties League Division One	34	26	6	2	114	39	81	02/18	Promoted
2011–12	North West Counties League Premier Division	42	29	5	8	111	49	92	02/22	
2012–13	North West Counties League Premier Division	42	26	9	7	105	45	84	04/22	Three pts deducted
2013–14	North West Counties League Premier Division	42	25	4	13	87	42	79	05/22	
2014–15	North West Counties League Premier Division	40	13	8	19	72	75	47	13/21	
2015–16	North West Counties League Premier Division	42	15	7	20	70	76	52	13/22	
2016–17	North West Counties League Premier Division	42	29	5	6	105	45	92	3/22	
2017–18	North West Counties League Premier Division	44	29	6	9	107	65	93	3/23	
2018–19	North West Counties League Premier Division	38	19	3	16	68	65	60	7/20	
2019–20	North West Counties League Premier Division	31	14	9	8	55	41	51	7/20	Season declared null and void due to COVID-19 pandemic
2020–21	North West Counties League Premier Division	6	3	2	1	14	7	11	5/20	Season curtailed due to COVID-19 pandemic
2021–22	North West Counties League Premier Division	40	5	12	23	53	93	27	21/21	Relegated
2022–23	North West Counties League Division One North	34	9	2	23	38	90	29	17/18	Reprieve from relegation
2023-24	North West Counties League Division One North	34	10	5	19	48	78	34	13/18	One point deducted
2024-25	North West Counties League Division One South	34	11	6	17	63	72	39	12/18	
Joined North West Counties League
2025–26	North West Counties League Division One South	34	28	5	1	118	24	89	1/19	Promoted

== Records ==
All of the below records are under the Runcorn Town name from the 2005–06 season, as no comprehensive records exist for the club under the Mond Rangers name.

== Club records ==
=== Wins and losses ===
Record	Details
Record home win (league):	12-0 vs Telford Town, 28 February 2026
Record home win (cup):	22–0 vs Roundhouse Rovers, 13 February 2010 (Runcorn Senior Cup)
Record away win (league):	8–0 vs Ashton Town 28 August 2010
Record away win (cup):	9–1 vs Waterloo Wanderers, 8 November 2008 (Runcorn Senior Cup)
Record away win (cup):	9–1 vs Robin Hood Helsby, 6 December 2008 (Runcorn Senior Cup)
Record home defeat (league):	7-2 vs Squires Gate F.C., 8 November 2014
Record home defeat (cup):	7-0 vs Chester 23 October 2019 (cheshire senior cup first round)
Record away defeat (league):	7–2 vs Barnoldswick Town F.C., 24 April 2017
Record away defeat (cup):	10-1 vs Nantwich_Town_F.C., 14 December 2023 (Cheshire Senior Cup)

=== Best performance ===
Record	Details
Best league finish:	2nd of 22 – North West Counties Football League Premier Division 2011–12
Best FA Cup performance:	Third qualifying round – vs Norton United 2014–15
Best FA Vase performance:	Fifth round proper - vs Walsall Wood 2012–13
Best Cheshire Senior Cup performance	Runner up 2025-26
Best Liverpool Senior Cup performance	Semi-final 2025-26

=== Sequences ===
Record	Details
Without defeat (all comps):	26 games, 25 November 2025 to 11 April 2026
Without defeat (league only):	31 games, 30 August 2025 to Current
Without a win (all comps):	11 games, 27 July 2024 to 31 August 2024
Without a win (league only):	10 games, 27 July 2024 to 31 August 2024
Consecutive wins (all comps):	20 games, 25 October 2025 to 25 March 2026
Consecutive wins (league only):	18 games, 25 October 2025 to 25 March 2026
Consecutive defeats (all comps):	11 games, 27 July 2024 to 31 August 2024
Consecutive defeats (league only):	10 games, 27 July 2024 to 31 August 2024

=== Attendances ===
Record	Details
Highest home crowd:	803 vs Runcorn Linnets 26 December 2013 (League)
Highest away crowd:	3,420 vs Macclesfield 6 November 2021 (League)

== Player records ==
=== Appearances ===
Record	Details
Most appearances:	281 - Danny Dalton (11 August 2007 to April 2014)
Consecutive appearances:	149 – Karl Wills (16 October 2010 to 21 September 2013)

=== Goals ===
Record	Details
Most goals in all competitions:	157 – James McShane (6 October 2007 to April 2016)
Most goals in a season:	45* – Craig Cairns (2016–17 season)
Most league goals in a season:	39* – Craig Cairns (2016–17 season)
Most goals in a single match:	6 – Jason Carey (vs Roundhouse Rovers, 13 February 2010)
Most hat-tricks in a season:	5 – Craig Cairns
Most hat-tricks:	9 – Craig Cairns
Scoring in consecutive games:	9 – Ian Cocks (29 October 2005 to 7 January 2006)
