= A.F.C. Liverpool =

Association football club in England

AFC Liverpool
- Full name: Affordable Football Club Liverpool
- Nickname: The Non League Reds
- Founded: 2008
- Ground: New Bucks Park, Bootle
- Chairman: Chris Stirrup
- Manager: Jack Edwards
- League: North West Counties League Premier Division
- 2025–26: North West Counties League Premier Division, 11th of 24
- Website: afcliverpool.co.uk
Home colours	Away colours

Affordable Football Club Liverpool is a semi-professional football club based in Liverpool, England. The club was formed in 2008 by 1,000 supporters of Liverpool Football Club; a not-for-profit organisation, it is run on a one-member, one-vote system. They are currently members of the North West Counties League Premier Division and play at Bootle's New Bucks Park.

== History ==
After plans were announced in February 2008, A.F.C. Liverpool were established by Alun Parry in March 2008 for Liverpool fans who had been priced out of Premier League football, adopting the same colours as Liverpool. The new club applied to enter Division Two of the North West Counties League for the 2008–09 season, with their place in the now-renamed Division One confirmed in June. They also agreed a groundshare with Prescot Cables to play at Valerie Park. By mid-July the club had attracted around 1,000 members.

The club played their first match on 16 July, a friendly against St Helens Town at Ashton Town's Edge Street. In front of a crowd of around 600, the game ended in a 1–1 draw, with Martin Crowder scoring A.F.C. Liverpool's first-ever goal. The club's first league match on 9 August saw them beat Darwen 5–0. Their first season saw the club win the Division One Challenge Trophy with a 1–0 win over Padiham, whilst they finished fourth in the league, missing out on promotion by four points.

In 2009–10 the club finished fifth in Division One. They also played in the FA Vase for the first time, losing 2–1 at home to Dinnington Town in the second qualifying round. However, they retained the Division One Challenge Trophy. In 2010–11 the club entered the FA Cup for the first time, losing 4–1 at Hemsworth Miners Welfare in the extra-preliminary round. In the league they finished fourth, earning promotion to the Premier Division after Rossendale United were expelled from the league and third-placed Holker Old Boys declined promotion. However, they failed to retain the Division One Challenge Trophy, losing 3–2 after extra time in the final by Atherton Collieries.

In 2012–13 they reached the final of the Liverpool Senior Cup, losing 4–3 on penalties to Bootle after a 1–1 draw. Prior to the 2014–15 season the club announced that they would be leaving Valerie Park and playing at Rossett Park in Crosby. They reached the Liverpool Senior Cup final again in 2014–15, losing 5–4 to Skelmersdale United. The 2017–18 season saw the club finish in the relegation zone, resulting in relegation back to Division One. In 2021 the club were promoted to the Premier Division based on their results in the abandoned 2019–20 and 2020–21 seasons.

=== Season-by-season ===
Season	League	Level	Pld	W	D	L	F	A	GD	Pts	Pos	Av. attendance	Manager
2008–09	North West Counties League Division One	10	34	22	3	9	82	39	+43	69	4/18	316	Derek Goulding
2009–10	North West Counties League Division One	10	32	15	4	13	60	43	+17	49	5/17	178	Derek Goulding; Paul Moore
2010–11	North West Counties League Division One	10	34	19	6	9	65	34	+31	63	4/18	126	Paul Moore
2011–12	North West Counties League Premier Division	9	42	13	6	23	60	73	–13	45	19/22	124	Paul Moore
2012–13	North West Counties League Premier Division	9	42	18	6	18	69	64	+5	60	11/22	108	Paul Moore
2013–14	North West Counties League Premier Division	9	42	21	7	14	88	54	+34	70	7/22	119	Paul Moore
2014–15	North West Counties League Premier Division	9	40	17	8	15	74	56	+18	59	9/21	139	Paul Moore
2015–16	North West Counties League Premier Division	9	42	11	15	16	86	92	–6	48	17/22	139	Paul Moore; Joe Gibbons; Kevin Dally
2016–17	North West Counties League Premier Division	9	42	16	9	17	79	84	–5	54	12/22	145	Kevin Dally
2017–18	North West Counties League Premier Division	9	44	12	6	26	77	94	–17	42	20/23	141	Chris Stammers; Stuart Keir & Ben Williams
2018–19	North West Counties League Division One North	10	38	25	4	9	97	67	+30	79	3/20	116	Stuart Keir & Ben Williams; Stuart Keir
2019–20	North West Counties League Division One North	10	29	17	6	6	91	43	+48	57	– (Note: Season Abandoned due to COVID-19 Pandemic)	118	Chris Anderson
2020–21	North West Counties League Division One North	10	4	3	1	0	15	7	+8	10	– (Note: Season Abandoned due to COVID-19 Pandemic) (Note: Promoted to the NWCFL Premier Division due to league restructuring)	123	Chris Anderson
2021–22	North West Counties League Premier Division	9	40	13	10	17	80	80	0	49	14		
2022–23	North West Counties League Premier Division	9	42	20	7	15	83	63	+20	67	6		
2023–24	North West Counties League Premier Division	9	46	18	5	23	87	114	–27	59	14		
Source: FCHD Non League Matters – NWC-P Non League Matters – NWC-1N

== Ground ==
The club play at New Bucks Park in Bootle, the home ground of Bootle FC.

== Honours ==
- North West Counties League
  - League Challenge Cup winners 2025–26
  - Division One Challenge Trophy winners 2008–09, 2009–10
- Joe Fagan Commemorative Trophy
  - Winners 2008–09, 2009–10
- The Fans Club Trophy
  - Winners 2008–09, 2009–10, 2010–11

== Records ==
- Best FA Cup performance: First qualifying round, 2015–16
- Best FA Vase performance: Fourth round, 2021–22, 2022–23
- Record attendance: 604 vs Wigan Robin Park, 6 September 2008 (at Valerie Park)
- Biggest win: 9–0 vs St Helens Town, 13 September 2014
- Heaviest defeat: 1–8 vs Winsford United, North West Counties League Premier Division 18 August 2012

== See also ==
- A.F.C. Liverpool players
- List of fan-owned sports teams
- F.C. United of Manchester
