= 1874 Northwich F.C. =

Association football club in England

Coordinates: 53.2746°N 2.5465°W

1874 Northwich
- Full name: 1874 Northwich Football Club
- Nickname: The '74, The Greens
- Founded: 15 November 2012; 13 years ago
- Ground: Townfield, Barnton
- Chairman: Richard Stockton
- Manager: Rory Fallon
- League: Northern Premier League Division One West
- 2025–26: Midland League Premier Division, 4th of 18 (promoted via play-offs)
- Website: 1874northwich.com
Home colours	Away colours	Third colours

1874 Northwich Football Club is a football club based in Northwich, Cheshire, England. Established in 2012 by supporters of Northwich Victoria, they are currently members of the Northern Premier League Division One West. Home matches are played at Barnton's Townfield ground. The club is fully owned by its supporters, and is run by a democratically elected board as a cooperative company.

== History ==
The club was established on 15 November 2012 at a meeting at Lostock Social Club in Lostock Gralam, near Northwich, when members of the Northwich Victoria Supporters' Trust were given the opportunity to decide on creating a new football club due to growing disenfranchisement with how Northwich Victoria has been run over many years. The vote ended with a 141–4 vote in favour of a new club. It had emerged on the day of the vote that the owner of Northwich Victoria had been declared bankrupt (later annulled) and therefore failed the FA Fit and Proper Persons test.

On 29 November 2012 fans attended an open meeting in Northwich, where they chose the name 1874 Northwich for the club. In order to avoid legal issues over the new club's name, none of the proposed options included the words Vics or Victoria. The date 1874 was chosen because it was the year in which the original club named Northwich Victoria was founded, or at least, when they played their first formal match. The original club became defunct and disbanded in 1890, when a new club, which elected to use the name Northwich Victoria was founded from an amalgamation of the original club bearing the same name and Hartford and Davenham United. Alongside the naming of the club, fans were also given the chance to vote on a motto; the phrase 'Ever Glorious', which was used by the Cheshire Regiment was chosen due to their links with the town of Northwich. One of the other options included the Latin translation, 'Semper Gloriosa'. Ever Glorious has also become established as the name of the club's match-day programme.

On 3 January 2013 it was confirmed that the club had been officially registered with the Cheshire County Football Association and had applied to join the North West Counties League in time for the 2013–14 season, and were accepted into Division One of the league on 23 May. The appointment of the club's first manager, former Winsford United and Ashton Athletic boss Ian Street was announced on 25 April 2013, with his assistant Lee Duckworth being announced three days later. The club played their first match on 10 July 2013 against local team Lostock Gralam, winning 3–1. Their first honours came three days later in the Supporters Direct Shield, when they defeated AFC Rushden & Diamonds 3–0 in Widnes at the Halton Stadium.

Their first league game was played on 3 August 2013 against Oldham Boro, where 490 fans attended the game which finished 1–1. In their first season, the club finished third in Division One, initially missing out on promotion to the Premier Division on goal difference. However, following the resignation of Formby in May, Northwich were promoted in their place. In their second season, the club finished third in the Premier Division and entered the FA Cup for the first time. They finished fourth in the Premier Division in 2015–16, and also won the Mid-Cheshire Senior Cup, beating Witton Albion in the final.

Ian Street resigned as first-team manager on 12 March 2017, with assistant Paul Bowyer and first-team coach Wayne Goodison becoming caretaker joint managers before being appointed on a permanent basis. The club went on to win the Mid-Cheshire Senior Cup with a 1–0 win over Northwich Victoria in the final. In 2017–18 they reached the semi-finals of the FA Vase, losing 4–2 on aggregate to Thatcham Town. The following season saw the club win the North West Counties Football League Cup, beating league champions City of Liverpool 1–0 in the final at Moss Lane. In July 2021 the club won the much-delayed 2019–20 League Cup, defeating Runcorn Town 6–3 in the final. After the 2020–21 season was curtailed due to the COVID-19 pandemic, the club were promoted to Division One West of the Northern Premier League having had the highest points-per-game (PPG) average in the North West Counties League Premier Division over the previous two curtailed seasons. In 2023–24 they finished bottom of Division One West and were relegated to the Premier Division of the Midland League.

In 2024–25 1874 Northwich finished fourth in the Midland League Premier division, qualifying for the promotion play-offs. After beating Atherstone Town 1–0 in the semi-finals, they lost 2–0 to Shifnal Town in the final. They finished fourth again the following season, going on to beat Winsford United 4–2 in the play-off semi-finals and then deafeat Northwich Victoria 1–0 in the final to secure promotion.

=== Season-by-season ===
Season	Division	P	W	D	L	F	A	Pts	Pos	FA Cup	FA Trophy	FA Vase	Av. attendance	Notes
2013–14	North West Counties League Division One	36	26	6	4	79	28	84	3/19	—	—	First qualifying round	320	Promoted
2014–15	North West Counties League Premier Division	40	26	8	6	90	35	86	3/22	Preliminary round	—	Third round	307	
2015–16	North West Counties League Premier Division	42	24	6	12	89	62	78	4/22	Preliminary round	—	Second round	265	
2016–17	North West Counties League Premier Division	42	25	7	10	81	50	82	5/22	Preliminary round	—	Second round	248	
2017–18	North West Counties League Premier Division	44	24	7	13	85	56	79	7/23	Third qualifying round	—	Semi-finals	223	
2018–19	North West Counties League Premier Division	38	15	11	12	63	55	56	10/20	Extra preliminary round	—	Second round	238	
2019–20	North West Counties League Premier Division	29	22	5	2	79	27	71	1/20	Second qualifying round	—	First qualifying round	280	Season abandoned due to COVID-19 pandemic
2020–21	North West Counties League Premier Division	5	3	0	2	12	8	9	10/20	Extra preliminary round	—	Second round	213	Season curtailed, promoted
2021–22	Northern Premier League Division One West	38	13	8	17	59	58	47	12/20	First qualifying round	Second qualifying round	—	281	
2022–23	Northern Premier League Division One West	38	12	9	17	44	50	45	14/20	Extra preliminary round	First qualifying round	—	347	
2023–24	Northern Premier League Division One West	38	4	6	28	24	89	18	20/20	Extra preliminary round	First qualifying round	—	347	Relegated
2024–25	Midland League Premier Division	34	19	9	6	63	45	66	4/18	Second qualifying round	First qualifying round	—	347	
2025–26	Midland League Premier Division	34	19	9	6	71	40	66	4/18	Extra preliminary round	First qualifying round	—	347	Promoted via the play-offs
Source: Non-League Matters

== Ground ==
The club play at the Townfield ground in Barnton, groundsharing with Barnton F.C. They previously played at Winsford United's Barton Stadium from their establishment until the end of the 2018–19 season.

== Managerial records ==
Based on win % in all matches excluding friendlies, correct as of 25 April 2026

Name	From	To	Record				
Name	From	To	P	W	D	L	%
Ian Street	2013	2017	196	122	27	47	62.24
Paul Bowyer & Wayne Goodison	2017	2023	272	132	49	91	48.53
Damian Crossley	2023	2024	11	0	3	8	0
Chris Herbert	2024	-	90	48	18	24	53.33

== Honours ==
- North West Counties League
  - Challenge Cup winners 2018–19, 2019–21
- Mid-Cheshire Senior Cup
  - Winners 2015–16, 2016–17
- Supporters Direct Shield
  - Winners 2013–14
- Midland League Premier Division
  - Playoff Winners 2025–26

== Records ==
- Best FA Cup performance: Third qualifying round, 2017–18
- Best FA Vase performance: Semi-finals, 2017–18
- Record attendance: 1,693 vs Thatcham Town, FA Vase semi-final, 24 March 2018
- Record home win: 9–0 vs Wigan Robin Park, FA Vase second qualifying round, 5 October 2014
- Record away win: 0–9 vs Litherland REMYCA, North West Counties League Premier Division, 2 November 2019
- Record home defeat: 0–5 vs Runcorn Linnets, Northern Premier League Division One West, 27 April 2024
- Record away defeat: 6–1 vs Runcorn Linnets, Cheshire Senior Cup quarter-final, 11 February 2025

== See also ==
- 1874 Northwich F.C. players
- 1874 Northwich F.C. managers
