= Maine Road F.C. =

English football club in Greater Manchester

Coordinates: 53°26′40″N 2°15′41″W

Maine Road
- Full name: Maine Road Football Club
- Nicknames: Road, The Sky Blues
- Founded: 1955
- Ground: Brantingham Road, Chorlton-cum-Hardy
- Capacity: 2,000 (200 seated)
- Chairman: Vacant
- Manager: Reece Lyndon & Ryan Eiselt
- League: North West Counties League Division One North
- 2025–26: North West Counties League Division One North, 18th of 18
- Website: maineroadfc.com
Home colours	Away colours

A crest marking the 50th anniversary of the club in 2005.

Maine Road Football Club is a football club, based in Chorlton-cum-Hardy, Manchester, England. Founded in 1955 by Manchester City supporters, they are currently members of the North West Counties League Division One North and play at Brantingham Road.

== History ==
The club was formed in 1955 by supporters of Manchester City under the name City Supporters Rusholme. They played friendly matches before joining the Rusholme Sunday League, remaining members until transferring to the Manchester Amateur Sunday League in 1966. The club also moved its headquarters to the Maine Road Social Club and were renamed Maine Road Football Club. After winning the Manchester County Sunday Cup and the league title in 1971–72, the club switched to Saturday football and joined Division Two of the Manchester League.

Maine Road won the Division Two title at the first attempt, earning promotion to Division One, as well as winning the Manchester County Amateur Cup. They went on to win Division One the following season and were promoted to the Premier Division. In 1975–76 the club won the Manchester Premier Cup, beating Abbey Hey WMC in the final; they retained the trophy the following season with a win over Little Lever. In 1982–83 the club were Premier Division champions. They retained the title for the next three seasons, before finishing as runners-up in 1986–87, after which the club moved up to Division Two of the North West Counties League.

Maine Road's first season in the North West Counties League saw them win the Manchester Premier Cup for a third time, beating Irlam Town 1–0 in the final. Despite finishing as Division Two runners-up in 1988–89, the club were not promoted after failing to meet ground grading regulations. However, the following season saw them win the Division Two title, earning promotion to Division One. They were Manchester Premier Cup finalists in 1998–99. Although the club were relegated at the end of the 2001–02 season, they were Division Two runners-up in 2003–04, and were promoted back to Division One, as well as reaching the final of the Manchester Premier Cup again. The club won the league's Challenge Cup in 2007–08, after which Division One was renamed the Premier Division. The club were Premier Division runners-up in 2013–14. However, they finished third-from-bottom of the Premier Division in 2017–18 season and were relegated to Division One South. At the end of the 2023–24 season the club were transferred to Division One North.

== Ground ==
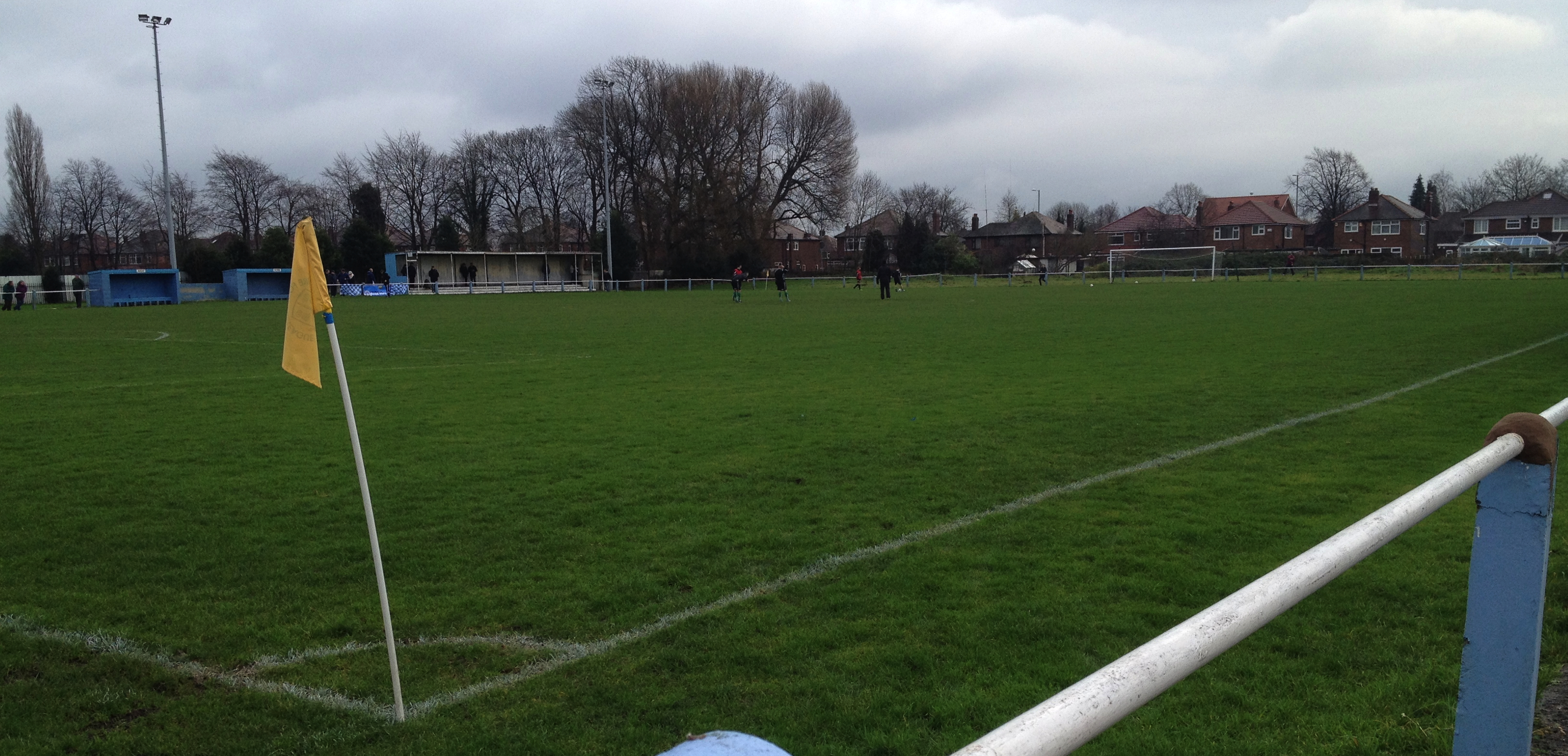
Brantingham Road

Brantingham Road during a North West Counties Football League match between Maine Road and 1874 Northwich.

After playing at several different grounds, Maine Road moved to Brantingham Road in 1980. After the ground was upgraded by the Manchester Football Association in the mid-1980s, it enabled the club to be promoted to the North West Counties League. The ground currently has a capacity of 2,000, of which 200 is seated and 700 covered.

The club's record home attendance of 3,181 was set on 4 November 2006 for a Division One match against FC United of Manchester (a team formed by supporters of Manchester City's arch rivals, Manchester United), although the game was played at Bower Fold in Stalybridge.

== Honours ==
- North West Counties League
  - Division Two champions 1989–90
  - Challenge Cup winners 2007–08
- Manchester League
  - Premier Division champions 1982–83, 1983–84, 1984–85, 1985–86
  - League Cup winners 1982–83, 1983–84
  - Division One champions 1973–74
  - Division Two champions 1972–73
- Manchester Amateur Sunday League
  - Champions 1971–72
- Manchester Premier Cup
  - Winners 1975–76, 1976–77, 1987–88
- Manchester Challenge Cup
  - Winners 1982–83, 1984–85, 1985–86, 1986–87, 2004–05, 2006–07
- Manchester Amateur Cup Winners
  - Champions 1972–73, 1997–98, 2006–07
- Manchester County Sunday Cup
  - Winners 1971–72

== Records ==
- Best FA Cup performance: Second qualifying round, 1989–90, 1990–91, 1992–93, 1994–95, 1997–98, 2001–02
- Best FA Vase performance: Fourth round, 1994–95
- Record attendance: 3,125 vs FC United of Manchester, North West Counties League Division One, 4 November 2006 (at Bower Fold)

== See also ==
- Maine Road F.C. players
- Manchester City F.C. supporters
- List of fan-owned sports teams
