= Ashton Athletic F.C. =

Association football club in Greater Manchester, England

Coordinates: 53°30′13.651″N 2°39′52.960″W

Ashton Athletic
- Full name: Ashton Athletic Football Club
- Nickname: The Yellows
- Founded: 1968
- Ground: Brocstedes Park, Ashton-in-Makerfield
- Capacity: 400 (100 seated)
- Chairman: Jimmy Whyte
- Manager: Jay Foulds & Dougie Pitts
- League: North West Counties League Division One North
- 2025–26: North West Counties League Division One North, 16th of 18
Home colours	Away colours

Ashton Athletic Football Club is a football club based in Ashton-in-Makerfield, Greater Manchester, England. Affiliated to the Lancashire County Football Association, they are currently members of the North West Counties League Division One North and play at Brocstedes Park.

== History ==
The club was formed in 1968, initially as a Sunday league club playing in the Wigan Sunday League. After winning every division in the league in successive seasons, they switched to playing Saturday football, joining the Warrington & District League.

Success in the Warrington League saw the club join the Lancashire Combination in 1978. However, the move up saw the club struggle, finishing bottom of the league in 1978–79 and 1981–82. When the league merged with the Cheshire County League to form the North West Counties League in 1982, Ashton were placed in Division Three, which they finished bottom of in both 1982–83 and 1983–84. After a fourteenth-place finish in 1984–85, they finished bottom of the table again in 1985–86.

At the end of the season the club were expelled from the league due to Brocstedes Park failing to meet the ground grading criteria. They subsequently dropped into Division One of the Manchester League. They continued to struggle in the Manchester League, with several lower-half finishes before finishing bottom of Division One in 1989–90. They finished bottom again in 1994–95,

The 2005–06 season saw them finish fourth in Division One, and after applying for rejoin the North West Counties League following improvements to Brocstedes Park, the club were accepted into Division Two, bypassing the Premier Division of the Manchester League. In 2007–08 a third-place finish saw them promoted to the renamed Premier Division of the league. Although they finished bottom of the division in 2010–11, they were reprieved from relegation after New Mills were promoted from the division and Formby were relegated due to a breach of the rules. In 2013–14 they won the Challenge Cup, defeating Maine Road 1–0 in the final. The 2016–17 season saw them win the Lancashire FA Challenge Trophy with a 2–1 win over Radcliffe Borough in the final.

In 2022–23 Ashton finished bottom of the Premier Division and were relegated to Division One North.

== Honours ==
- North West Counties League
  - Challenge Cup winners 2013–14
- Atherton Charity Cup
  - Winners 2006–07
- Lancashire FA Challenge Trophy
  - Winners 2016–17

== Records ==
- Best FA Cup performance: Third qualifying round, 2017–18
- Best FA Vase performance: Third round, 2017–18
- Record attendance: 610 vs Chorley, FA Cup third qualifying round, 30 September 2017

== See also ==
- Ashton Athletic F.C. players
