= Norton United F.C. =

Coordinates: 53°03′02.67″N 2°10′14.45″W

Norton United
- Full name: Norton United Football Club
- Founded: 1989
- Dissolved: 2015
- Ground: Norton Cricket Club & Miners Welfare Institute; Community Drive; Smallthorne; Stoke on Trent
- Capacity: 1,500 (200 Seated)
- League: Northern Premier League; Division One South
- 2014–15: Northern Premier League; Division One South, 11th
Home colours	Away colours

Norton United F.C. was a football club based in Smallthorne, Stoke-on-Trent, Staffordshire, England. They were established in 1989 and joined the Staffordshire Senior League in the same year. They were the Midland League champions three times, North West Counties Football League champions in 2013–14, and were promoted to be members of the Northern Premier League Division One South. On 9 April 2015 it was announced that Norton United would resign from the Northern Premier League at the end of the season and fold.

The club's ground was the Norton Cricket Club & Miners Welfare Institute; however' they left that ground mid season due to contractual issues with the owners and played their remaining fixtures at Lyme Valley Stadium, home of Newcastle Town.. They played in black and red striped shirts, black shorts and black socks.

== Honours ==
- North West Counties Football League Premier Division
  - Champions 2013–14
- North West Counties Football League Division One
  - Runners-up 2011–12
- North West Counties Football League Division One Trophy
  - Winners 2011–12
- Midland League
  - Champions 1996–97, 1998–99, 2000–01
- Midland League Cup
  - Winners 1991–92, 1996–97, 2000–01
- Staffordshire FA Senior Vase
  - Winners 1998–99, 2003–04
  - Runners-up 2011–12

== Records ==
- FA Cup
  - First round proper 2014–15
- FA Vase
  - Fourth round 2011–12
