= Padiham F.C. =

Association football club in England

Coordinates: 53°48′08.72″N 2°19′16.83″W

Padiham
- Full name: Padiham Football Club
- Nickname: The Storks
- Founded: 1948; 78 years ago
- Ground: Arbories Memorial Sports Ground, Padiham
- Capacity: 1,688
- Chairman: Shaun Astin
- Manager: Michael Morrison
- League: Northern Premier League Division One West
- 2025–26: North West Counties League Premier Division, 4th of 24 (promoted via play-offs)
| Home colours | Away colours |

Padiham Football Club are an English football team based in Padiham, Lancashire. As of the 2026–27 season, they will play in the Northern Premier League Division One West.

== History ==
The club was founded in 1948 with the renovation of the Arbories Memorial Sports Ground. The new club was admitted to the second division of the Lancashire Combination for 1949–50 and a crowd of 1,777 turned up to see their opening fixture of the season in August with Chorley reserves.

They became founder members of the North West Counties Football League in 1982 but left the league in 1990. They returned in 2000 after spending £500,000 on upgrading the Arbories Memorial Sports Ground and finished in the top four of the second division in 2003 and 2005.

They gained promotion to the Northern Premier League Division One North for season 2013–14 after winning the North West Counties Football League Premier Division in season 2012–13, but returned to the North West Counties League after being relegated two seasons later.

=== Racial abuse ===
In October 2018, a game between Congleton Town and Padiham was called off after fans subjected Padiham players to racial abuse, and Padiham players' wallets were emptied in the changing rooms during the game.

Congleton were fined £160 for their supporters' abuse, while Padiham were fined £165 for leaving the field.

== Current staff ==
Michael Morrison (Mozza) is the current Padiham FC manager, supported by Matt Barnes (Assistant Manager), and Martin Campbell (Goalkeeping Coach).

== Honours ==
- Lancashire Amateur Cup
  - Finalists: 1965–66
- North West Counties League Premier Division
  - Champions: 2012–13
- North West Counties League Division One
  - Runners-up: 2008–09
- North West Counties League Division Three
  - Runners-up: 1983–84
- West Lancashire Football League
  - Division One Winners: 1999–2000
  - Division Two Winners: 1971–72, 1976–77
- NHS Bird Cup
  - Winners: 2010–11

== Records ==
- FA Vase
  - Third Round 1981–82
