= Daisy Hill F.C. =

Association football club in Greater Manchester, England

Coordinates: 53°31′55″N 2°31′05″W

- Full name: Daisy Hill Football Club
- Nickname: The Cutters
- Founded: 1894; 132 years ago
- Ground: The Ginge Power Stadium
- Capacity: 2,000
- Chairman: TBC
- Manager: Nicky Hunt
- League: North West Counties League Division One North
- 2025–26: North West Counties League Division One North, 11th of 18
- Website: daisyhillfc.co.uk
Home colours	Away colours

Daisy Hill Football Club are a football club founded in 1894 and located in the Daisy Hill district of Westhoughton, in Greater Manchester, England. The stadium which is called The Ginge Power Stadium due to sponsorship from content creator Angryginge, is located at St James Street in Westhoughton which has a capacity of 2000. They currently play in the North West Counties League Division One North and are full members of the Lancashire County Football Association. In 1989 they changed name to Westhoughton Town before reverting to Daisy Hill in 1994. They are nicknamed "The Cutters".

== History ==
Daisy Hill were established in 1894. in the 1896–97 season they were Wigan & District League champions and also won the Westhoughton Cup, achieving both honours without losing a game all season. By the time of World War I the club were playing at their present ground, New Sirs and competing in the Leigh & District Senior Sunday School League. They then joined the Westhoughton League winning a number of honours in the 1920s and 1930s and during this time, Lancashire County Cricket Club cricketers Dick Pollard and Bill Farrimond both played football for Daisy Hill. Alf Gray, the future Torquay United player, also started his career with the club in the early 1930s.

The club folded some time before World War II and were re-formed in 1951, playing again in the Westhoughton League, but having moved to play on St. James Street Recreation and Cricket Ground before moving back to their current home in 1957. Having acquired the lease or the ground, Daisy Hill then started playing in the Bolton Combination. After dressing rooms were built for the start of the 1968–69 season they were crowned Bolton Combination Premier Division champions four times, the Bolton Combination Cup four times and the Lancashire County FA Amateur Shield twice.

In 1978 they joined the Lancashire Combination in which they competed for four seasons from 1978–79 to 1981–82, before becoming founder members of the North West Counties League Division Three in 1982, when a new clubhouse was built at New Sirs. In the 1986–87 season they finished fourth in Division Three, before it was absorbed into Division Two the following season when they reached the second round of the FA Vase. After the 1988–89 season the club changed name to Westhoughton Town, playing under the new name for five seasons from 1989–90 to 1993–94. before reverting to Daisy Hill for the 1994–95 season. In the 1994-95 season the club won the Atherton Charity Cup for the first time under the management of Jimmy Hulton & Tony Riley. They remained in Division Two for the next 14 seasons before the league was rebranded and Division Two was renamed the First Division in the 2008–09 season.

In the 2005–06 season, FC United of Manchester competed in the North West Counties League Second Division, and with their large support, the home match against them was moved to Victory Park, and a crowd of 1,682 was recorded. It was during the course of the 2005–06 season, where Daisy Hill's Under 18's side progressed to the FA Youth Cup First Round proper after defeating non-league sides Prescot Cables, Retford United and Farsley Celtic. They finally succumbed 4–2 against League One opposition in the form of Doncaster Rovers. This was unprecedented and remains a first for a team from the Bolton Boys Federation to achieve this feat. This side also contained 8 young players who represented Lancashire FA at under 18s level, one of whom included former Inverness Caledonian Thistle, Dundee, Accrington Stanley and current FC Halifax Town player Danny Williams.

The club finished the 2013–14 season in one of the two relegation places, but avoided relegation following the resignations from the league of Leek CSOB and Formby.

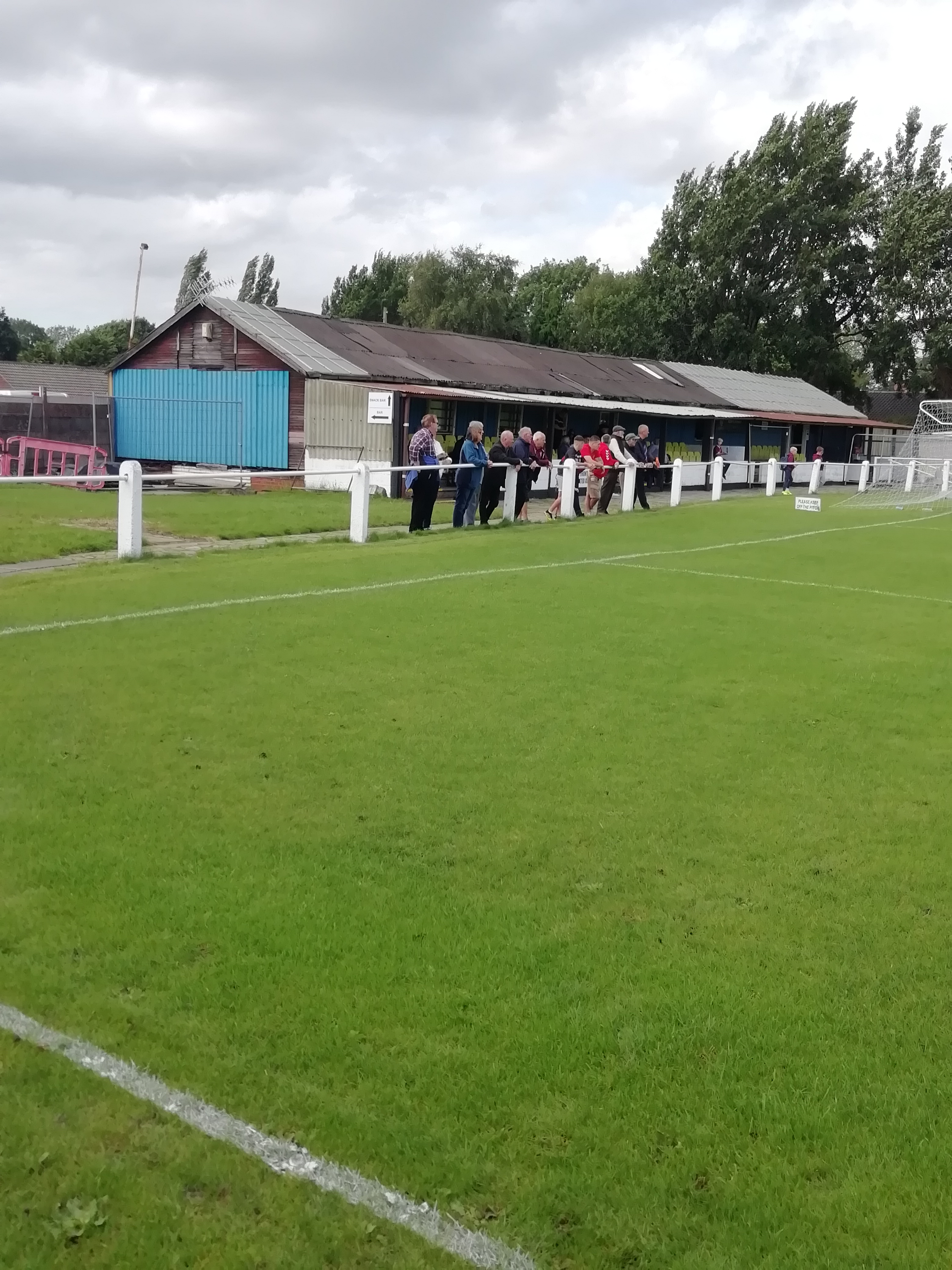
New sirs, clubhouse, changing rooms and seating

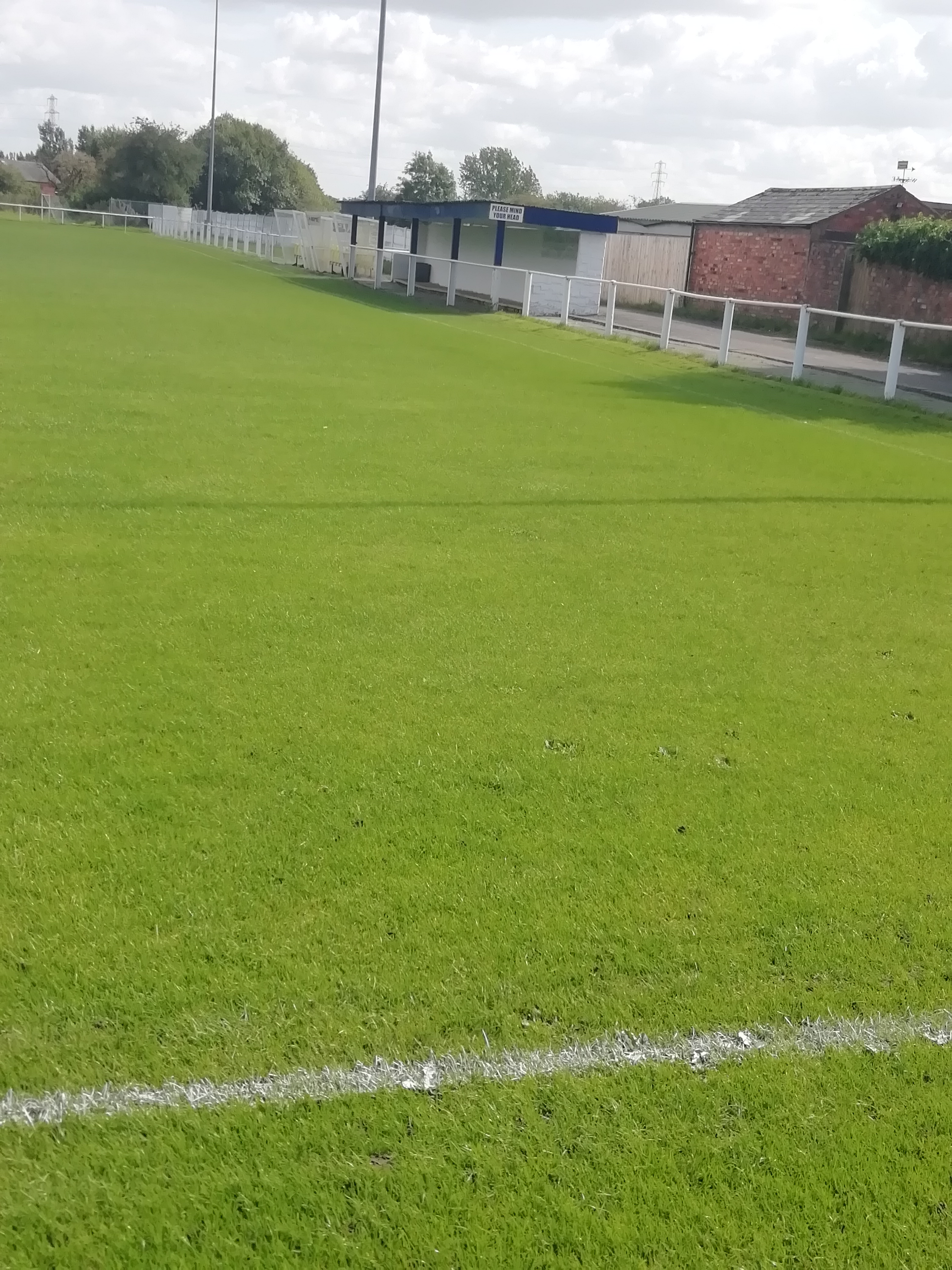
New Sirs Covered standing

On 12 February 2025, it was announced that Daisy Hill would be under new stewardship with social media influencer and Bolton native Aaron Hunt becoming their official chairman. Attendances flourished following the influence of Hunt and the club now attracts attendances of 200+. Social media influencers such as Angryginge and Steve Bracknall have attended Daisy Hill FC's football games since Aaron Hunt took over as chairman. Exhibition matches involving the YouTubers have helped the club with attendances of 1,000 and above. However, Hunt resigned from his position as Chairman in March 2026 citing 'family reasons'.

== Attendances ==
=== Averages ===
The average league-game attendance at New Sirs for the 2015–16 season was 40, placing Daisy Hill 17th for the division, and was a decrease of 21.2% from the previous season.

Past averages:

- 2014–15: 50
- 2013–14: 40
- 2012–13: 34
- 2011–12: 37
- 2010–11: 37
- 2009–10: 42
- 2008–09: 47
- 2007–08: 77
- 2006–07: 43
- 2005–06: 123
- 2004–05: 39
- 2003–04: 34

Source: Tony Kempster's site Non League Matters NW Counties Football League site

== Records ==
- Best FA Cup performance: Extra preliminary round, 2006–07, 2007–08, 2008–09, 2010–11, 2012–13, 2020–21
- Best FA Vase performance: 2nd round, 1987–88, 2009–10

== Honours ==
- Atherton Charity Cup Champions (2): 1994/95; 2024/25
- Wigan & District League champions (1): 1896–97
- Westhoughton Cup (1): 1896–97
- Bolton Combination Premier Division (4):
- Bolton Combination Cup (4):
- Lancashire FA Amateur Shield (2):
