= Darwen F.C. =

Association football club in England

Coordinates: 53°42′42.38″N 2°28′38.25″W

- Full name: Darwen Football Club
- Nickname: The Salmoners
- Founded: 2009
- Ground: Anchor Ground, Darwen
- Capacity: 4,000
- Chairman: Kenny Langford
- Manager: Ben Langford and Nathan Bond
- League: North West Counties League Division One North
- 2025–26: North West Counties League Division One North, 6th of 18
- Website: darwenfc.co.uk
Home colours	Away colours

Darwen Football Club is a football club from Darwen, Lancashire, England. The club was formed in 2009 as A.F.C. Darwen, a successor to the original Darwen club, which had been wound up. They currently play in the North West Counties League Division One North and are based at the Anchor Ground.

== History ==
On 22 December 2003, Carlsberg-Tetley tried to wind up Darwen Football and Social Club. Although the club, then playing in Division One of the North West Counties League, avoided liquidation on that occasion, another winding up petition was brought by The Bee radio station on 14 April 2008 in respect of £8,000 owed for advertising. Plans were made for Blackburn with Darwen Council to buy the Anchor Ground. However, following two further petitions for liquidation brought by Thwaites Brewery and ING Lease UK and their refusal of an offer of 25p in the pound, the 134-year old Darwen Football Club was wound up in the High Court on 14 May 2009.

Almost immediately, there were plans for a new Darwen football club to be formed. This was achieved before the start of the 2009–10 season, with AFC Darwen created, taking over the Anchor Ground from the dissolved club. However, the new club had to start at step 7 (level 11) of the football pyramid. They successfully applied for admission to the West Lancashire League, and were placed in the Premier Division. After finishing eighth in their first season, they were promoted to Division One of the North West Counties League. In 2014–15 the club won the Division One Trophy with a 3–1 win over Atherton Collieries in the final, also finishing third in Division One and qualifying for the promotion play-offs. After beating Chadderton 2–1 in the semi-finals, they defeated Hanley Town 5–3 in the final, earning promotion to the Premier Division.

The 2017–18 season saw AFC Darwen finish bottom of the Premier Division, resulting in relegation to Division One North. In June 2022 the club was renamed Darwen Football Club.

== Honours ==
- North West Counties League
  - Division One Trophy winners 2014–15
- Martin Vizzard Memorial Trophy
  - Winners 2016

== Records ==
- Best FA Cup performance: Extra-preliminary round, 2015–16, 2016–17
- Best FA Vase performance: Third round, 2022–23
- Record attendance: 982 vs Bury AFC, North West Counties League Division One, 9 October 2021

== See also ==
- Darwen F.C. players
- Darwen F.C. managers
