= Abbey Hey F.C. =

Association football club in Greater Manchester, England

Coordinates: 53°27′17″N 2°10′01″W

- Full name: Abbey Hey Football Club
- Nickname: The Red Rebels
- Founded: 1902
- Ground: Abbey Stadium, Gorton
- Chairman: Terry Hincks
- Manager: Matty German
- League: North West Counties League Premier Division
- 2025–26: North West Counties League Premier Division, 21st of 24
- Website: abbeyheyfc.online
Home colours	Away colours

Abbey Hey Football Club is a football club named after the Abbey Hey area of Gorton, Manchester, England. They are currently members of the North West Counties League Premier Division and play at the Abbey Stadium. The club are full members of the Manchester Football Association.

== History ==
The club was established in 1902 as Abbey Hey W.M.C. They joined Division One South of the Manchester League in 1970, and after winning Division One in 1970–71, they were promoted to the Premier Division at the end of the 1971–72 season. They went on to win the Premier Division in 1981–82, 1988–89, 1990–91, 1993–94 and 1994–95. After finishing as runners-up in 1997–98 the club were promoted to Division Two of the North West Counties League. They were runners-up in their first season in the division, resulting in promotion to Division One.

In 2009–10 the club finished bottom of the Premier Division (as Division One had been renamed in 2008) and were relegated to Division One. They were promoted back to the Premier Division after finishing as runners-up in Division One in 2012–13. In 2018–19 the club finished bottom of the Premier Division and were relegated to Division One South. They finished fourth in Division One South in 2023–24, qualifying for the promotion play-offs. After beating Sandbach United 3–1 in the semi-finals, the club defeated Stockport Town on penalties in the final, earning promotion to the Premier Division.

== Ground ==
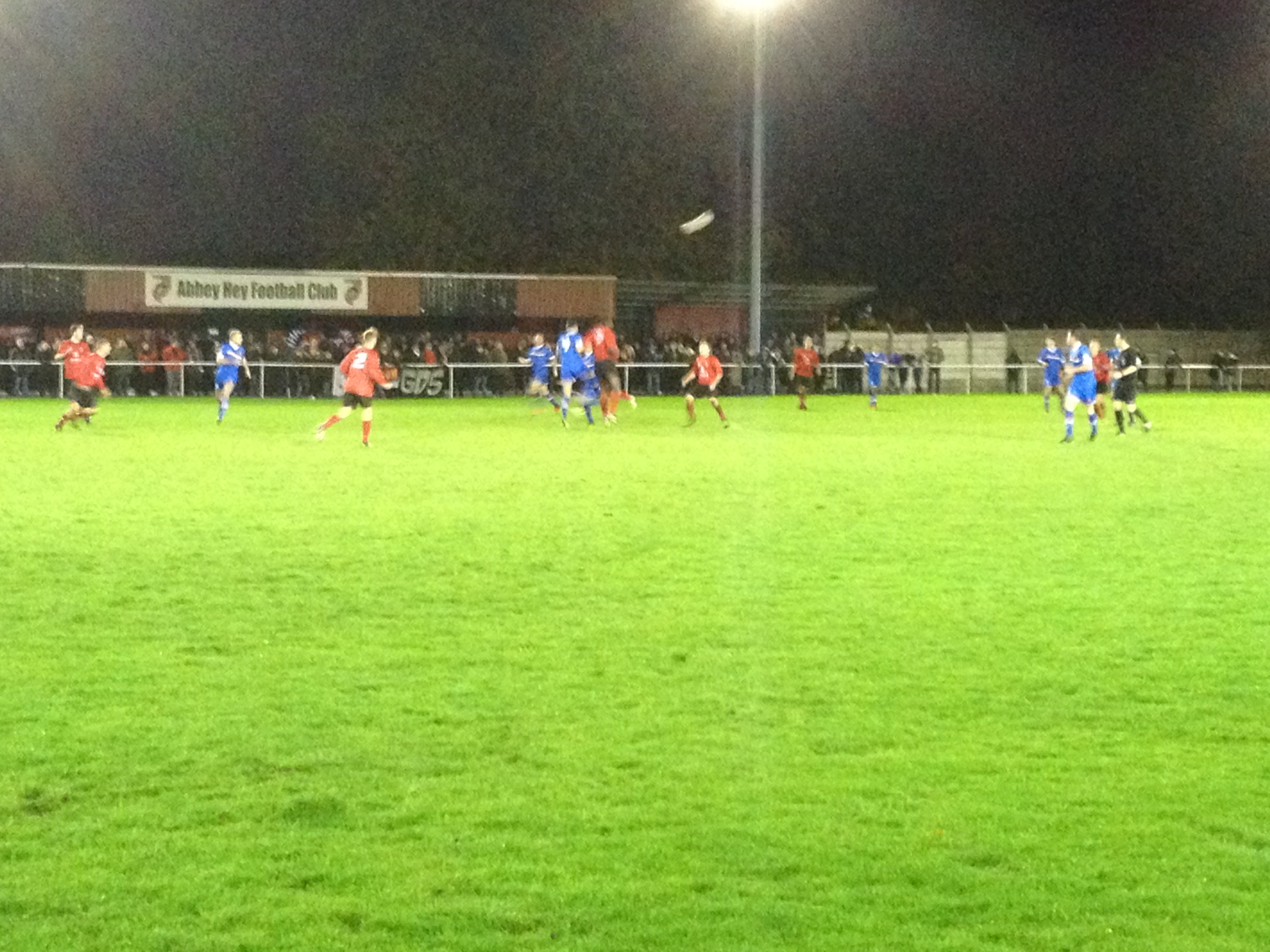
Abbey Hey vs F.C. United of Manchester at the Abbey Stadium in November 2016

After joining the Manchester League, the club were required to have an enclosed ground, and moved to St Werburghs Road in Chorlton-cum-Hardy. However, two years later they were required to leave, this time moving back to Abbey Hey to a ground named for councillor Godfrey Erman.

After eighteen years at Godfrey's, the club were told to move out. They spent two seasons playing at the English Steel ground, during which they negotiated the purchased of land in Goredale Avenue in Gorton and built a new ground, the Abbey Stadium. The stadium is fully enclosed with a large clubhouse on one side of the pitch which has two bar areas. Opposite the clubhouse is a small covered enclosure which has basic bench-style seating at each end with a standing area in the middle.

== Honours ==
- North West Counties League
  - Challenge Cup winners 2009–10
- Manchester League
  - Premier Division champions 1981–82, 1988–89, 1991–92, 1993–94, 1994–95
  - Division One South champions 1970–71
  - Open Trophy winners 1992–93, 1995–96, 1996–97
  - Gilcryst Cup winners 1976–77, 1988–89
- South East Lancs League
  - Champions 1966–67, 1968–69
  - League Shield winners 1965–66
- Manchester Amateur League
  - Champions 1964–65
- Manchester United Memorial Cup
  - Winners 1965–66
- Manchester County Amateur Cup
  - Winners 1964–65, 1967–68, 1968–69

== Records ==
- Best FA Cup performance: Second qualifying round, 2012–13, 2015–16
- Best FA Vase performance: Fifth round, 2021–22
- Record attendance: 1,461 vs FC United of Manchester, 2006–07

== See also ==
- Abbey Hey F.C. players
