= Squires Gate F.C. =

Association football club in England

Coordinates: 53°46′45.33″N 3°00′54.59″W

Squires Gate
- Full name: Squires Gate Football Club
- Nicknames: Gate, The Blues
- Founded: 1948 (as Squires Gate British Legion)
- Ground: The Skiddle Community Stadium, Squires Gate, Blackpool
- Capacity: 1,000
- Chairman: John Maguire
- Manager: Luke Evans
- League: North West Counties League Division One North
- 2024–25: North West Counties League Premier Division, 24th of 24 (relegated)
Home colours	Away colours

Squires Gate Football Club is a football club based in Squires Gate, Blackpool, Lancashire, England, formed in 1948. After spending thirty years in the West Lancashire League, in 1991 it was elected to the North West Counties Football League Division Two, and is currently in the Division One.

== History ==
=== Blackpool & District Amateur League: 1958 to 1961 ===
Squires Gate was formed in 1948 as Squires Gate British Legion and competed in the Blackpool & District Amateur League. The team won the League's Rawling Shield in their first season. The name of the club was changed to Squires Gate F.C. in 1953. They won the League's First Division in 1955–56 and 1956–57; also the Blackwell Cup in 1958–59 and 1959–60. They spent the 1960–61 in the Fylde District League, winning the Fylde Cup and being the losing finalists in the Bannister Cup.

=== West Lancashire League: 1961 to 1991 ===
The following season the club moved up to the West Lancashire League, where it spent the next thirty years. From 1961 until 1980 it was in Division Two, being promoted in 1981 as champions. In the 1986–87 season the side won the Richardson Cup.

=== North West Counties League: 1991 onward ===
They were elected into the North West Counties Football League for the 1991–92 season, joining Division Two for the 1991–92 season. Squires Gate won the league's Fair Play Award for the 1993–94 season and were losing finalists in the 1997–98 Division Two Trophy.

They won the 2001–02 season Division Two Trophy and then the following season they missed the runner-up spot on goal difference but were still promoted to Division One following the demise of Stand Athletic F.C. who had originally been promoted as Division Two champions. They reached their highest league placing in the 2005–06 season, also reaching the quarter-finals of the FA Vase.

On 10 March 2007, Squires Gate played a home match against FC United of Manchester at Curzon Ashton's ground. The club had approached Blackpool about playing the game at Bloomfield Road but the ground was not available. The team played the match in Ashton-under-Lyne, as it was felt that FCUM fans were more likely to attend with the match being staged in the Greater Manchester area. A crowd of 1,650 saw Squires Gate lose 0–1, the club earning about £7,000.

In the summer of 2012, Gate changed its Stadium name to The Royal British Legion Stadium.

On 12 November 2014; Jack Sowerby, signed for League One outfit Fleetwood Town. He now plays football for Northampton Town.

On 25 April 2015, Gate manager Dave McCann led his team to the club's highest-ever position, reaching sixth position in the NWCFL Premier Division, finishing with 67 points after playing Alsager Town. The Squires Gate team that played that day were: Fletcher, Richards, Westwood, Anderson, Ferguson, Mckenna, Penswick, Kay, Dunn, Murphy, Buchan. Subs: McCann, Lancashire, Rowley, Cunningham.

The following season, manager Dave McCann's resignation was reluctantly accepted by club chairman Stuart Hopwood; he was replaced by club captain Daniel Penswick. Penswick led Gate to a 19th-place finish in the 2015–16 season, with a last-day win over Ashton Athletic, to remain in the Premier Division.

Another success story came from Squires Gate, as Josh Kay went on to play for AFC Fylde, before eventually getting a move to Barnsley in 2015. He now plays for League Two side Barrow AFC.

Luke Evans was appointed manager of the club in October 2019. Evans led the club to 9th in his first season at Squires Gate before the season was deemed null and void due to the coronavirus pandemic.

== Ground ==
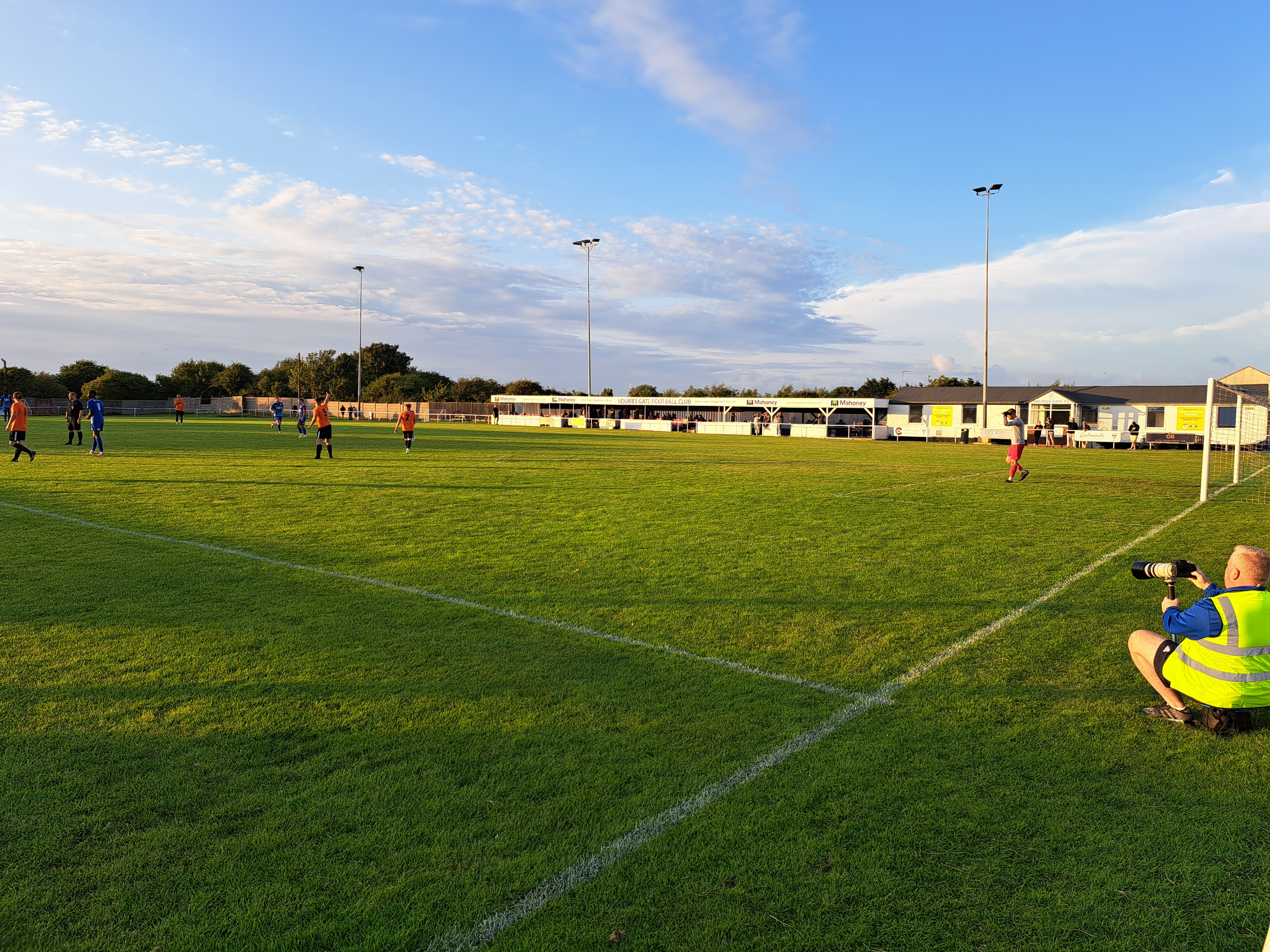
The Skiddle Community Stadium during a friendly match

The club play at The Skiddle Community Stadium. It has seen some development since the club was elected to the North West Counties League. There is a clubhouse at the ground and floodlights. The record attendance at School Road is 1,000, for a regular season matchup against Bury FC in 2024. During the summer of 2025 the ground has seen further development, including the erection of a modern entrance and refurbishment of the catering facilities.

== Honours ==
League

- Blackpool & District Amateur League, First Division
  - Champions (2): 1956, 1957
- West Lancashire League, Division Two
  - Champions (1): 1981

Cup

- Rawling Shield
  - Winners (1): 1949
- Blackwell Cup
  - Winners (2): 1959, 1960
- Fylde Cup
  - Winners (1):1961
- Bannister Cup
  - Runners-up (1): 1961
- Richardson Cup
  - Winners (1): 1987
- NWCFL Division Two Trophy
  - Winners (1): 2002
  - Runners-up (1): 1998

== Records ==
- Best League performance: 6th, North West Counties League Premier Division, 2014-15
- Best FA Cup performance: Second qualifying round, 2001–02, 2004–05, 2021-22
- Best FA Vase performance: Quarter-final, 2005–06
