= Wigan Robin Park F.C. =

Coordinates: 53°32′46.99″N 2°39′04.71″W

Wigan Robin Park
- Full name: Wigan Robin Park Football Club
- Nickname(s): The Robins
- Founded: 2005
- Dissolved: 2015
- Ground: Robin Park Arena, Wigan
- Capacity: 1,200
- Chairman: Darryl Picton
- Manager: John Neafcy
- 2014–15: North West Counties League; Division One, 19th
Home colours	Away colours

Wigan Robin Park FC was a semi-professional football club from Wigan, Greater Manchester, England.

The Robins had two senior sides, the first team competed in the North West Counties League Division One, and the reserve team competed in the Fourth Division of the Manchester Football League. The club played their home games at the Robin Park Arena on Loire Drive, adjacent to the DW Stadium.

The first team resigned from the league in June 2015.

== History ==
Wigan Robin Park Football Club was founded in 2005 and joined the Manchester Football League – a feeder league of the North West Counties divisions. After winning the Manchester League in 2007–08 they were promoted to the North West Counties League Division One.

The 2011–12 season saw success for the club after they were crowned champions of Division One, winning promotion to the Premier Division.

In January 2014, Steve Halliwell announced that Darryl Picton would be replacing him as chairman.

After playing two seasons in the North West Counties Football League Premier Division, they were relegated to Division One at the end of the 2013–14 season.

== Honours ==
- North West Counties Football League Division One
  - Champions 2011–12
- Manchester Football League Premier Division
  - Champions 2007–08
- Gilgryst Cup
  - Winners 2007–08
- Lancashire Shield
  - Runners-up 2007–08
- Manchester Football League Division One
  - Runners-up 2006–07
- Murray Shield
  - Runners-up 2005–06

== Records ==
- FA Cup
  - Extra Preliminary Round replay 2010–11
- FA Vase
  - Third Round 2012–13
