= Ashton Town F.C. =

Association football club in Greater Manchester, England

Coordinates: 53°29′31″N 2°37′27″W

Ashton Town
- Full name: Ashton Town Football Club
- Nickname: The Town
- Founded: 1953
- Ground: Edge Green Street, Ashton-in-Makerfield
- Chairman: Chris Wright
- Manager: Vedran Meter
- League: North West Counties League Division One North
- 2025–26: North West Counties League Division One North, 8th of 18
- Website: ashtontownfc.com
Home colours	Away colours

Ashton Town Football Club is a football club based in Ashton-in-Makerfield, Greater Manchester, England. The club are currently members of the North West Counties League Division One North and play at Edge Green Street.

== History ==
The original Ashton Town joined Division Two of the Lancashire Combination in 1903, and were promoted to Division One in their first season. However, they were relegated back to Division Two after finishing sixteenth in their first season in Division One. Towards the end of the 1910–11 season the club withdrew from the league and their fixtures were taken over by Tyldesley Albion.

The current club was established in 1953 as Makerfield Mill. They initially played in the Wigan Sunday School League, before moving to the St Helens Combination, in which they played for three years, winning Division Two in 1957–58. In 1958 they joined the Warrington & District League, winning Division One in 1959–60 and 1950–61. In 1962 the club were renamed Ashton Town after being forced out of their Windsor Road ground and moving home matches to a public park pitch at Whithill Street Recreation Ground in Bryn. However, they won the league again in 1962–63 and 1963–64. In 1964 the club purchased their Edge Green Street ground, which had currently hosted Stubshaw Cross Rovers. They finished as Division One champions for a fifth time in 1964–65, before winning a sixth title in 1969–70. They subsequently joined the Lancashire Combination in 1971, moved to Division Two of the Cheshire County League in 1978 and became a founder member of Division Three the North West Counties League in 1982.

In 1985 Ashton dropped into Division One of the Manchester League, and despite only finishing sixth in the 1985–86 season, they returned to Division Three of the North West Counties League the following season. After Division Three was merged into Division Two in 1987, the club have remained at the same level (with the division renamed Division One in 2008) until the end of the 2016–17, when they finished bottom of Division One and were relegated to the Premier Division of the Cheshire League. Despite only finishing sixth in the Premier Division of the Cheshire League in 2017–18, Ashton were promoted back to Division One North of the North West Counties League.

== Honours ==
- Warrington and District League
  - Division One champions 1959–60, 1960–61, 1962–63, 1963–64, 1964–65, 1969–70
- St Helens Combination
  - Division Two champions 1957–58
- Liverpool FA Shield
  - Winners 1956–57
- Wigan Cup
  - Winners 1960–61, 2018–19
- Stubshaw Cross medal competition
  - Winners 1966–67
- Atherton Charity Cup
  - Winners 2012–13

== Records ==
- Best FA Cup performance: Preliminary round, 2007–08
- Best FA Vase performance: Third round, 2024–25
- Record attendance: 1,865 vs F.C. United of Manchester, 2007

== See also ==
- Ashton Town F.C. players
- Ashton Town F.C. managers
