= 2024–25 North West Counties Football League =

The 2024–25 North West Counties Football League season is the 43rd in the history of the North West Counties Football League, a football competition in England.

The league comprised three divisions: the Premier Division (at level 9 of the English football league system, Step 5 National League System) and two regional divisions at level 10 or Step 6. The latter were designated the First Division North and First Division South, with the champions of each division competing in a single match for the First Division Champions Cup. Additionally, there were two cup competitions: the League Challenge Cup (known as the Macron Challenge Cup for sponsorship reasons), a knockout competition open to all the league's clubs; and the First Division Trophy (known as the Edward Case Cup, named after the trophy), a knockout trophy competition for First Division clubs only.

== Premier Division ==
North West Counties Football League Premier Division
- Season: 2024–25
- Teams: 24
- Champions: Bury
- Promoted: Bury; Lower Breck
- Relegated: Colne; Squires Gate
- Matches: 552
- Goals: 1,916 (3.47 per match)
- Average attendance: 394

Four clubs had left the division after the previous season:

- Kendal Town, transferred laterally to the Northern League Division One
- Skelmersdale United, relegated to the First Division North
- Wythenshawe, promoted as champions to the Northern Premier League Division One West
- Wythenshawe Town, promoted as promotion play-off winners to the Northern Premier League Division One West

The 2024–25 Premier Division club allocations from the FA Leagues Committee (subject to appeal) were announced on 15 May 2024 and the constitution of the division was adopted at the league's AGM on 15 June 2024. The division comprised 24 clubs, 20 remaining from the previous season plus 4 additions:

- Abbey Hey, promoted as promotion play-off winners from the First Division South
- FC St Helens, promoted as champions from the First Division North
- Stockport Town, promoted as promotion play-off runners-up from the First Division South
- South Liverpool, promoted as promotion play-off winners from the First Division North

In their final league match of the season on 19 April 2025 Bury set a new league single match attendance record of 8,719 at their home stadium of Gigg Lane versus Burscough (surpassing the previous highest of 6,023 set at the Divivision Two F.C. United of Manchester v Great Harwood Town match played on 22 April 2006, also at Gigg Lane).

At the end of the season the champions Bury and promotion play-off winners Lower Breck (who had finished as runners-up of the division) were promoted to the Northern Premier League Division One West. Two clubs were relegated, Colne and Squires Gate both to the First Division North.

=== League table ===
Pos	Team	Pld	W	D	L	GF	GA	GD	Pts	Season End Notes
1	Bury (C, P)	46	33	10	3	131	49	+82	109	Promoted to the Northern Premier; League Division One West
2	Lower Breck (O, P)	46	33	7	6	122	46	+76	106	Won promotion play-offs, promoted to Northern Premier; League Division One West (Note: Winner from the four clubs who competed in the promotion play-offs)
3	Ramsbottom United	46	29	10	7	92	42	+50	97	Qualified for the promotion play-offs
4	Padiham	46	25	12	9	104	72	+32	87	Qualified for the promotion play-offs
5	West Didsbury & Chorlton	46	26	8	12	99	57	+42	86	Qualified for the promotion play-offs
6	Chadderton	46	23	8	15	103	86	+17	77	
7	Irlam	46	21	12	13	83	65	+18	74 (Note: Irlam had 1 point deducted for fielding an ineligible player on 10 December 2024)	
8	FC St Helens	46	21	8	17	86	70	+16	71	
9	AFC Liverpool	46	22	4	20	90	90	0	70	
10	Stockport Town	46	19	9	18	65	68	−3	66	
11	Burscough	46	20	6	20	69	79	−10	66	
12	Charnock Richard	46	18	10	18	98	87	+11	64	
13	Abbey Hey	46	18	9	19	80	89	−9	63	
14	Cheadle Town	46	18	7	21	62	61	+1	61	
15	FC Isle of Man	46	17	10	19	77	82	−5	61	
16	Glossop North End	46	16	9	21	67	77	−10	57	
17	Barnoldswick Town	46	15	12	19	65	82	−17	54 (Note: Barnoldswick Town had 3 points deducted)	
18	Longridge Town	46	13	9	24	70	108	−38	48	
19	Litherland REMYCA	46	12	10	24	64	92	−28	46	
20	South Liverpool	46	10	11	25	51	98	−47	41	
21	Pilkington	46	10	10	26	67	108	−41	40	
22	Prestwich Heys	46	10	6	30	52	90	−38	36	
23	Colne (R)	46	9	9	28	50	99	−49	36	Relegated to First Division North
24	Squires Gate (R)	46	7	8	31	69	119	−50	29	Relegated to First Division North

Source: "Final Tables, Season 2024/25". nwcfl.com., "North West Counties League - North West Counties League Premier Division: 2024 – 25: League Table". nonleaguematters.co.uk.
Rules for classification: 1) points; 2) goal difference; 3) number of goals scored; 4) number of matches won; 5) head-to-head results
(C) Champions; (O) Play-off winners; (P) Promoted; (R) Relegated

=== Results table ===
Home \ Away	ABB	ALV	BAR	BRS	BRY	CHA	CHR	CHT	COL	FIM	FSH	GNE	IRL	LIT	LON	LOW	PAD	PIL	PRE	RAM	SLP	SQG	STO	WDC
Abbey Hey		2–2	1–2	2–1	1–7	2–1	2–4	3–2	6–0	1–2	0–0	2–1	4–4	1–3	4–1	1–3	0–2	4–3	0–0	0–0	2–0	3–2	4–1	1–3
AFC Liverpool	2–1		2–0	5–1	0–2	1–7	3–3	0–3	2–0	2–1	1–2	4–1	3–0	1–0	3–0	0–2	1–3	2–0	3–0	0–3	2–1	5–3	2–6	1–6
Barnoldswick T	2–2	1–1		1–1	1–4	0–4	0–4	1–0	2–3	1–3	4–1	0–1	2–2	2–1	2–1	3–3	2–2	2–0	2–3	1–1	3–2	4–1	1–1	1–0
Burscough	1–2	1–0	2–1		2–4	3–4	1–3	1–2	2–0	2–1	1–0	0–1	1–0	2–1	2–0	1–2	2–2	3–2	1–0	0–6	1–2	4–2	0–1	3–1
Bury	3–3	2–0	2–0	4–0		3–1	1–1	3–0	4–0	3–2	1–1	2–2	2–2	7–0	8–0	3–2	4–0	2–0	5–2	2–2	2–0	3–0	2–1	2–1
Chadderton	3–3	2–5	1–1	2–1	2–5		3–1	2–0	3–2	1–2	3–0	4–2	0–6	4–2	1–2	0–0	1–1	4–1	3–0	2–1	3–3	3–1	2–0	1–6
Charnock Richard	1–3	4–5	3–1	2–1	0–2	3–2		1–0	2–2	2–1	2–2	0–1	4–0	4–0	4–4	3–1	1–3	4–2	2–2	0–2	2–2	2–2	1–2	2–5
Cheadle Town	0–1	0–3	1–3	0–1	0–2	1–3	1–2		1–0	4–0	1–3	1–1	0–0	1–1	3–1	1–4	1–1	4–0	2–1	0–1	2–0	5–0	0–0	3–4
Colne	2–1	1–2	1–4	0–3	0–2	1–2	3–2	0–1		1–1	2–1	2–2	0–2	1–1	1–1	1–3	1–2	2–4	1–3	1–0	2–3	1–0	0–2	2–0
FC Isle of Man	3–1	2–1	1–1	3–2	1–1	2–2	1–4	2–0	1–1		3–2	0–2	1–1	2–3	0–1	0–4	2–1	3–3	2–2	0–1	2–2	2–3	1–2	0–2
FC St Helens	3–0	3–2	0–1	2–2	0–1	1–0	4–1	0–1	2–0	5–4		1–1	0–1	2–1	3–0	1–1	2–3	2–1	4–2	0–3	5–0	5–0	4–1	0–1
Glossop NE	0–1	2–5	3–0	1–2	2–4	2–3	0–2	0–0	2–1	1–2	2–0		1–4	2–1	2–2	0–4	1–2	4–0	2–1	0–0	1–2	5–1	0–1	0–2
Irlam	2–0	2–1	3–0	1–2	1–1	0–1	3–2	1–3	2–2	1–3	0–3	2–1		5–0	0–0	2–2	1–3	3–1	1–0	1–1	5–1	0–1	1–2	3–2
Litherland R	3–1	3–1	2–1	1–3	3–1	1–3	4–1	0–3	1–3	1–2	4–1	1–1	1–2		3–2	2–4	0–0	0–1	2–1	0–4	1–0	4–2	2–4	1–1
Longridge Town	2–1	3–1	3–3	1–0	1–5	1–2	0–4	0–1	8–0	1–3	0–4	0–1	2–3	1–0		1–5	0–5	0–2	1–0	3–1	2–0	3–2	2–2	1–5
Lower Breck	4–0	2–1	6–0	4–2	4–3	2–1	2–1	1–0	1–0	3–0	5–1	5–0	2–2	1–0	3–3		4–1	5–0	2–1	3–0	6–0	3–0	0–1	3–1
Padiham	5–2	4–2	0–2	3–1	1–5	2–0	5–3	6–1	2–1	2–1	3–3	4–3	1–2	2–2	0–1	2–1		2–0	4–1	1–4	1–2	3–1	3–1	2–2
Pilkington	4–1	1–2	2–0	2–2	0–2	2–2	1–0	1–3	1–1	3–3	0–1	1–3	1–3	2–2	3–6	1–4	1–3		3–2	2–2	4–3	3–1	0–3	1–1
Prestwich Heys	0–1	0–1	0–2	1–2	0–2	3–5	0–4	1–4	1–1	1–3	0–3	0–3	2–1	1–0	2–1	0–1	0–3	2–2		1–2	4–1	3–0	0–2	2–2
Ramsbottom U	3–0	2–1	1–1	4–0	1–1	1–0	3–2	2–1	2–0	1–2	2–3	1–1	3–2	3–1	2–2	3–1	0–2	2–0	2–1		4–0	2–1	2–0	1–0
South Liverpool	1–6	1–2	3–1	1–1	0–1	4–6	0–0	1–1	2–0	0–2	1–1	2–0	0–0	3–2	3–1	0–0	1–1	0–0	0–3	0–4		0–2	1–2	0–2
Squires Gate	1–3	2–2	2–1	1–1	4–4	2–2	2–3	2–3	5–1	0–3	2–3	0–2	2–3	0–0	5–2	0–2	3–3	3–4	0–1	2–3	0–1		2–0	1–3
Stockport Town	0–1	2–1	0–1	0–2	1–2	3–2	1–1	0–1	1–3	2–1	3–1	2–4	1–2	1–1	3–3	0–2	2–2	2–1	1–0	0–1	2–1	2–2		1–1
W Didsbury & Ch	0–0	3–4	2–1	1–2	4–0	1–0	2–1	1–0	4–3	2–1	3–1	3–0	0–1	2–2	1–0	3–0	1–1	3–1	1–2	1–3	4–1	4–1	2–0	

Source: "Premier Division Results 2024/25". nwcfl.com.
Legend: Blue = home team win; Yellow = draw; Red = away team win.

=== Promotion play-offs ===
The 2024–25 Premier Division promotion play-offs, contested by the clubs that finished second to fifth position in the league table, were won by Lower Breck who had been runners-up of the division.

Semi-finals
2	Lower Breck	2
5	West Didsbury & Chorlton	1
3	Ramsbottom United	1
4	Padiham	2

Final
2	Lower Breck	2
4	Padiham	0

Source="Premier Division Play-Off Results 2024/25". nwcfl.com.

==== Semi-finals ====
26 April 2025	Lower Breck	2–1	West Didsbury & Chorlton	Anfield
15:00	Burns 80', 84'	Report	Matthews 36'	Stadium: Anfield Sports and Community Centre; Attendance: 802; Referee: Adam Sefton

26 April	Ramsbottom United	1–2	Padiham	Ramsbottom
15:00	Barlow 90+1'	Report	Wilkins 45'; Brownhill 65'	Stadium: Harry Williams Riverside Stadium; Attendance: 1,182; Referee: Archie Banks

==== Final ====
3 May 2025	Lower Breck	2–0	Padiham	Anfield
15:00	Dowling 57'; Hughes 90+6'	Report		Stadium: Anfield Sports and Community Centre; Attendance: 646; Referee: David Chisnall

=== Stadia and locations ===
Locations of the 2024–25 North West Counties Football League Premier Division teams
Locations of 2024–25 North West Counties Premier Division teams (Greater Manchester)
Locations of 2024–25 North West Counties Premier Division team (Isle of Man)

Team	Stadium
Abbey Hey	The Abbey Stadium, Gorton
AFC Liverpool	Rossett Park, Crosby (groundshare with Marine)
Barnoldswick Town	Greenberfield Lane
Burscough	Victoria Park
Bury	Gigg Lane
Chadderton	MCA Stadium
Charnock Richard	Mossie Park
Cheadle Town	Park Road Stadium
Colne	Holt House
Glossop North End	Surrey Street
FC Isle of Man	The Bowl, Douglas
FC St Helens	Windleshaw Sports
Irlam	Silver Street
Litherland REMYCA	Litherland Sports Park
Longridge Town	Mike Riding Ground
Lower Breck	Anfield Sports and Community Centre
Padiham	Arbories Memorial Sports Ground
Pilkington	Ruskin Drive Sportsground
Prestwich Heys	Adie Moran Park
Ramsbottom United	Harry Williams Riverside Stadium
South Liverpool	Jericho Lane
Squires Gate	School Road
Stockport Town	Stockport Sports Village
West Didsbury & Chorlton	Brookburn Road, Chorlton

== First Division North ==
North West Counties Football League First Division North
- Season: 2024–25
- Teams: 18
- Champions: Atherton Laburnum Rovers
- Promoted: Atherton Laburnum Rovers; Euxton Villa
- Relegated: Skelmersdale United
- Matches: 306
- Goals: 1,114 (3.64 per match)
- Average attendance: 177

Five clubs had left the division after the previous season:

- FC St Helens, promoted as champions to the Premier Division
- Ilkley Town, transferred laterally to the Northern Counties East League Division One
- Runcorn Town, transferred laterally to the First Division South
- Shelley, transferred laterally to the Northern Counties East League Division One
- South Liverpool, promoted as promotion play-off winners to the Premier Division

The constitution of the 2024–25 First Division North adopted by the league AGM was per the club allocations issued by the FA Leagues Committee and comprised 18 clubs, 13 remaining from the previous season plus 5 additions:

- Droylsden, transferred laterally from the First Division South
- Maine Road, transferred laterally from the First Division South
- Maghull, promoted as runners-up from the West Cheshire League Division One
- Skelmersdale United, relegated from the Premier Division
- Thornton Cleveleys, promoted as champions of the West Lancashire League Premier Division.

At the end of the season champions Atherton Laburnum Rovers and promotion play-off winners Euxton Villa (who had finished fifth in the division) were promoted to the Premier Division. Atherton Laburnum Rovers won a treble of titles this season: in addition to the First Division North title they won the First Division Trophy and were victorious in the First Division Champions Cup. Both Garstang and Route One Rovers were reprieved from relegation – the latter were then transferred laterally to the Northern Counties East League Division One. The only club relegated, for their third successive relegation, were Skelmersdale United who went to the Liverpool County Premier League.

=== League table ===
Pos	Team	Pld	W	D	L	GF	GA	GD	Pts	Season End Notes
1	Atherton Laburnum Rovers (C, P)	34	25	3	6	77	31	+46	78	Promoted to the Premier Division
2	Nelson	34	24	1	9	88	38	+50	73	Qualified for the promotion play-offs
3	Droylsden	34	21	6	7	67	37	+30	69	Qualified for the promotion play-offs
4	Holker Old Boys	34	20	8	6	84	42	+42	68	Qualified for the promotion play-offs
5	Euxton Villa (O, P)	34	20	5	9	71	46	+25	65	Won promotion play-offs, promoted to Premier Division (Note: Winner from the four clubs who competed in the promotion play-offs)
6	Darwen	34	20	1	13	78	54	+24	61	
7	Ashton Town	34	15	8	11	62	51	+11	53	
8	Maine Road	34	16	3	15	66	48	+18	51	
9	AFC Blackpool	34	16	4	14	72	68	+4	49 (Note: AFC Blackpool were deducted three points.)	
10	Maghull	34	14	5	15	74	74	0	47	
11	Daisy Hill	34	13	7	14	59	58	+1	46	
12	Bacup Borough	34	13	6	15	64	61	+3	45	
13	Ashton Athletic	34	12	6	16	53	69	−16	42	
14	Thornton Cleveleys	34	12	2	20	53	75	−22	38	
15	Steeton	34	9	5	20	46	73	−27	32	
16	Route One Rovers	34	8	4	22	45	82	−37	28	Reprieved from relegation, transferred to Northern Counties; East League Division One
17	Garstang	34	6	4	24	32	83	−51	22	Reprieved from relegation
18	Skelmersdale United (R)	34	2	2	30	23	124	−101	8	Relegated to the Liverpool County Premier League

Source: "Final Tables, Season 2024/25". nwcfl.com., "North West Counties League - North West Counties League First Division North: 2024 – 25: League Table". nonleaguematters.co.uk.
Rules for classification: 1) points; 2) goal difference; 3) number of goals scored; 4) number of matches won; 5) head-to-head results
(C) Champions; (O) Play-off winners; (P) Promoted; (R) Relegated

=== Results table ===
Home \ Away	ABL	ASA	ASH	ALR	BAC	DAI	DAR	DRO	EUX	GAR	HOL	MAG	MAI	NEL	ROU	SKE	STE	THO
AFC Blackpool		0–0	0–2	2–1	6–2	1–3	3–2	3–5	1–2	3–1	5–1	4–2	1–0	0–2	5–0	2–1	1–1	3–1
Ashton Athletic	4–2		3–0	0–2	2–1	5–1	1–5	0–4	0–1	3–3	1–0	2–2	1–2	1–3	1–4	2–0	2–1	2–4
Ashton Town	1–2	0–3		0–0	4–2	1–2	0–2	2–2	1–0	3–0	0–3	4–4	4–3	2–2	1–2	5–0	2–0	4–1
Atherton Lab R	5–4	3–1	1–1		6–0	6–0	0–2	2–0	1–2	5–1	2–0	3–0	3–2	1–3	4–2	3–0	1–0	1–0
Bacup Borough	1–2	5–0	2–2	0–2		2–0	3–1	2–0	0–1	5–0	1–1	7–4	0–2	1–0	2–2	2–1	0–1	2–3
Daisy Hill	1–1	2–2	1–2	0–1	2–0		1–2	1–1	2–2	4–1	0–1	2–1	1–0	2–3	1–0	6–0	2–3	2–3
Darwen	2–1	4–1	3–0	1–2	1–0	4–1		0–1	4–1	1–0	2–4	1–3	2–1	3–1	4–0	5–2	3–2	3–4
Droylsden	1–0	5–1	3–1	0–0	0–0	1–2	3–2		2–1	1–0	2–2	1–0	2–1	1–0	0–0	3–0	6–1	7–0
Euxton Villa	4–1	4–4	0–4	1–0	2–2	1–0	5–1	1–2		5–0	3–2	4–0	2–1	2–0	1–3	4–0	1–0	2–2
Garstang	5–0	1–1	1–0	0–4	0–4	0–3	0–2	1–3	0–4		1–3	1–2	0–3	0–1	3–2	3–3	3–0	0–2
Holker OB	2–4	3–2	2–2	3–1	3–1	1–1	1–1	4–0	2–2	2–0		3–0	3–2	4–1	0–2	4–0	2–0	5–0
Maghull	4–0	2–1	0–2	2–4	3–2	3–2	3–2	2–0	1–2	2–2	1–1		2–1	0–5	3–5	7–1	3–2	0–2
Maine Road	3–0	2–1	1–2	1–3	0–4	1–1	2–0	2–0	2–0	2–0	0–0	3–2		1–3	3–1	1–2	3–0	4–0
Nelson	2–1	1–2	4–2	0–1	5–1	5–1	3–0	1–2	2–0	6–0	1–2	2–1	4–2		5–1	5–0	3–1	2–1
Route One R	2–3	0–1	1–3	0–3	0–2	2–3	3–2	1–3	1–4	0–2	1–3	1–3	1–1	0–4		2–0	0–2	1–3
Skelmersdale U	1–4	0–1	0–3	1–2	1–3	0–5	1–6	1–2	2–4	2–1	0–9	0–5	0–6	0–5	2–2		1–5	0–3
Steeton	3–3	1–0	1–1	1–2	3–3	1–1	0–3	0–3	2–1	1–0	2–5	1–6	3–4	0–1	1–2	3–1		3–4
Thornton Cle	1–4	1–2	0–1	1–2	1–2	1–3	1–2	3–1	1–2	1–2	1–3	1–1	0–4	2–3	4–1	1–0	0–1	

Source: "First Division North Results 2024/25". nwcfl.com.
Legend: Blue = home team win; Yellow = draw; Red = away team win.

=== Promotion play-offs ===
The 2024–25 First Division North promotion play-offs, contested by the clubs that finished second to fifth position in the league table, were won by Euxton Villa who had been fifth-placed in the division – they had progressed to the final following a 10–9 penalty shoot-out win in their semi-final match.

Semi-finals
2	Nelson	1	(9 p)
5	Euxton Villa	1	(10 p)
3	Droylsden	1	(3 p)
4	Holker Old Boys	1	(1 p)

Final
5	Euxton Villa	2
3	Droylsden	0

Source="First Division North Play-Off Results 2024/25". nwcfl.com.

==== Semi-finals ====
19 April 2025	Droylsden	1–1 (3–1 p)	Holker Old Boys	Droylsden
15:00 GMT	Shipton 63'	Report	Amison 37'	Stadium: Butcher's Arms Ground; Attendance: 843; Referee: Alex Phillips
	Penalties
	Kilheeney (penalty scored); Moran (penalty scored); Shipton (penalty scored); Forshaw (penalty missed)		(penalty missed) Hodgson; (penalty scored) McGladdery; (penalty missed) Wood; (penalty missed) Amison

19 April 2025	Nelson	1–1 (9–10 p)	Euxton Villa	Nelson
15:00 GMT	Cane 44'	Report	Colquhoun 31'	Stadium: The Daisy Arena; Attendance: 435; Referee: Joseph Morrell
	Penalties
	Azam (penalty scored); Ince (penalty scored); Thompson (penalty scored); Doherty (penalty scored); Holden (penalty scored); Edward (penalty scored); Anderson (penalty scored); Brown (penalty scored); Forbes (penalty scored); Cane (penalty missed)		(penalty scored) Uppal; (penalty scored) Tait; (penalty missed) Gibson; (penalty scored) Bibby; (penalty scored) Colquhoun; (penalty scored) Bentham; (penalty scored) Reader; (penalty scored) Wyers-Roebuck; (penalty scored) Kent; (penalty scored) Darr; (penalty scored) Lombard

==== Final ====
26 April 2025	Droylsden	0–2	Euxton Villa	Droylsden
15:00 GMT		Report	Colquhoun 30'; Uppal 36'	Stadium: Butcher's Arms Ground; Attendance: 2,568; Referee: Abby Dearden

=== Stadia and locations ===
Locations of 2024–25 North West Counties First Division North teams (Greater Manchester)
2024–25 First Division North: Location of clubs
Locations of 2024–25 North West Counties First Division North teams (West Yorkshire)

Team	Stadium
AFC Blackpool	The Mechanics
Ashton Athletic	Brockstedes Park
Ashton Town	Edge Green Street
Atherton Laburnum Rovers	Crilly Park
Bacup Borough	West View
Daisy Hill	New Sirs, Westhoughton
Darwen	The Anchor Ground
Droylsden	Butcher's Arms Ground
Euxton Villa	Jim Fowler Memorial Ground
Garstang	The Riverside
Holker Old Boys	Rakesmoor Lane, Barrow-in-Furness
Maghull	Old Hall Field
Maine Road	Brantingham Road, Chorlton
Nelson	Victoria Park
Route One Rovers	Marley Stadium
Skelmersdale United	The Community Ground, Burscough
Steeton	Marley Stadium
Thornton Cleveleys	Gamble Road

== First Division South ==
North West Counties Football League First Division South
- Season: 2024–25
- Teams: 18
- Champions: Winsford United
- Promoted: Abbey Hulton United; Winsford United
- Matches: 306
- Goals: 1,070 (3.5 per match)
- Average attendance: 125

Five clubs had left the division after the previous season:

- Abbey Hey, promoted as promotion play-off winners to the Premier Division
- Brocton, promoted and transferred laterally to the Midland League Premier Division
- Droylsden, transferred laterally to the First Division North
- Maine Road, transferred laterally to the First Division North
- Stockport Town, promoted as champions to the Premier Division

The constitution of the 2024–25 First Division South adopted by the league AGM was per the club allocations issued by the FA Leagues Committee and comprised 18 clubs, 13 remaining from the previous season plus 5 additions:

- Allscott Heath, transferred laterally from the Midland League Division One where they were runners-up but eliminated in the first round of the promotion play-offs
- Foley Meir, returning to the division after a one season absence, promoted from third in the Staffordshire County Senior League
- Runcorn Town, transferred laterally from the First Division North
- Shawbury United, transferred laterally from the Midland League Division One
- Wolverhampton Sporting, transferred laterally from the Midland League Division One

At the end of the season champions Winsford United and promotion play-off winners Abbey Hulton United (who had finished as runners-up of the division) were both promoted to Step 5 and transferred laterally to the Midland League Premier Division. No clubs were relegated as the three bottom-placed clubs, Foley Meir, Shawbury United and Wolverhampton Sporting, were all reprieved. In the initial club allocations for the following season Cheadle Heath Nomads were selected for a lateral transfer to the First Division North however after review this was rescinded.

=== League table ===
Pos	Team	Pld	W	D	L	GF	GA	GD	Pts	Season End Notes
1	Winsford United (C, P)	34	27	5	2	93	29	+64	86	Promoted to the Midland; League Premier Division
2	Abbey Hulton United (O, P)	34	22	3	9	85	40	+45	69	Won promotion play-offs, promoted to Midland League Premier Division (Note: Winner from the four clubs who competed in the promotion play-offs)
3	Stafford Town	34	20	7	7	85	39	+46	67	Qualified for the promotion play-offs
4	Sandbach United	34	20	5	9	62	50	+12	65	Qualified for the promotion play-offs
5	Eccleshall	34	17	6	11	56	45	+11	57	Qualified for the promotion play-offs
6	Cheadle Heath Nomads	34	15	7	12	58	52	+6	52	
7	Ashville	34	15	5	14	58	50	+8	50	
8	Stockport Georgians	34	15	4	15	61	66	−5	49	
9	Market Drayton Town	34	14	5	15	70	63	+7	47	
10	Cammell Laird 1907	34	14	5	15	59	59	0	47	
11	Alsager Town	34	13	7	14	61	57	+4	46	
12	Runcorn Town	34	11	6	17	63	72	−9	39	
13	New Mills	34	11	5	18	39	47	−8	38	
14	Barnton	34	10	6	18	44	71	−27	36	
15	Allscott Heath	34	9	7	18	46	86	−40	34	
16	Foley Meir	34	8	6	20	55	81	−26	30	Reprieved from relegation
17	Shawbury United	34	6	9	19	33	67	−34	27	Reprieved from relegation
18	Wolverhampton Sporting	34	7	6	21	42	96	−54	27	Reprieved from relegation

Source: "Final Tables, Season 2024/25". nwcfl.com., "North West Counties League - North West Counties League First Division South: 2024 – 25: League Table". nonleaguematters.co.uk.
Rules for classification: 1) points; 2) goal difference; 3) number of goals scored; 4) number of matches won; 5) head-to-head results
(C) Champions; (O) Play-off winners; (P) Promoted

=== Results table ===
Home \ Away	AHU	ALL	ALS	ASH	BNT	CAM	CHN	ECC	FOL	MDT	NWM	RUN	SAN	SHA	STF	STG	WIN	WSC
Abbey Hulton U		4–0	4–1	1–0	3–2	2–2	3–0	1–3	4–2	2–0	1–0	1–4	5–1	1–1	0–1	1–2	0–1	6–0
Allscott Heath	4–3		0–3	4–7	2–4	0–4	0–3	0–1	1–0	3–0	0–1	1–0	1–4	2–2	1–1	3–2	2–3	1–2
Alsager Town	0–1	3–0		1–1	1–2	3–0	3–3	2–3	1–0	0–5	2–0	2–0	0–2	0–1	3–2	3–2	2–3	4–0
Ashville	2–3	4–2	2–1		0–1	0–1	0–1	0–1	3–4	1–0	3–0	3–0	1–4	2–2	1–2	1–2	0–1	4–0
Barnton	1–3	0–0	0–4	1–1		2–0	1–2	0–1	1–1	0–2	3–1	5–4	1–2	1–1	0–5	3–3	0–7	4–3
Cammell L 1907	0–3	2–4	1–2	2–3	2–1		1–1	0–0	1–0	5–0	0–1	5–1	1–2	4–0	0–2	0–3	2–2	3–0
Cheadle Heath N	2–1	2–2	2–0	1–3	0–2	1–3		1–2	0–1	1–1	6–2	2–1	0–0	2–0	1–3	0–2	0–2	3–0
Eccleshall	3–0	1–2	2–0	0–1	1–3	0–1	1–1		3–3	3–1	2–0	2–3	0–1	3–1	2–6	0–2	1–0	4–0
Foley Meir	1–5	1–4	2–2	3–2	1–0	1–2	1–3	3–4		1–4	2–0	3–6	0–1	3–1	2–4	1–2	2–3	4–0
Market Drayton T	0–9	8–2	4–4	1–3	1–0	4–1	2–2	1–3	5–0		1–1	4–0	3–0	0–1	0–1	6–2	1–2	4–3
New Mills	1–2	0–1	2–2	1–2	0–0	1–2	2–0	0–1	2–1	0–1		0–0	1–3	8–0	0–2	1–0	0–2	3–0
Runcorn Town	1–0	2–2	2–0	0–0	5–1	4–3	1–4	2–3	2–2	1–1	1–3		3–4	1–3	0–3	3–1	1–3	2–3
Sandbach United	0–4	4–0	1–1	0–3	4–0	4–3	2–5	1–0	2–0	3–1	1–2	1–0		1–0	1–1	4–1	1–3	3–1
Shawbury United	1–2	1–1	2–5	1–3	1–0	0–3	2–0	1–1	1–1	2–1	0–1	1–2	0–1		1–1	0–1	0–1	4–4
Stafford Town	0–1	9–0	2–0	4–0	3–2	5–0	1–2	2–1	2–2	2–0	1–3	1–5	1–1	7–2		3–0	2–3	3–1
Stockpt Georgians	0–2	1–1	3–1	1–2	1–0	1–2	1–4	2–2	5–3	1–5	3–1	3–1	3–1	1–0	1–1		0–3	2–3
Winsford United	2–2	2–0	1–3	4–0	5–1	4–1	4–0	2–2	5–0	4–1	2–1	0–0	3–0	1–0	2–2	4–1		7–0
Wolverhampton S	2–5	2–0	2–2	0–0	1–2	2–2	2–3	2–0	0–4	0–2	0–0	2–5	2–2	2–0	1–0	1–6	1–2	

Source: "First Division South Results 2024/25". nwcfl.com.
Legend: Blue = home team win; Yellow = draw; Red = away team win.

=== Promotion play-offs ===
The 2024–25 First Division South promotion play-offs, contested by the clubs that finished second to fifth position in the league table, were won by Abbey Hulton United who had been runners-up of the division.

Semi-finals
2	Abbey Hulton United	5
5	Eccleshall	0
3	Stafford Town	5
4	Sandbach United	4

Final
2	Abbey Hulton United	2	(3 p)
3	Stafford Town	2	(0 p)

Source="First Division South Play-Off Results 2024/25". nwcfl.com.

==== Semi-finals ====
19 April 2025	Abbey Hulton United	5–0	Eccleshall	Abbey Hulton
15:00	Ward 10'; Gumbley 22'; Holdham 36'; Bell 56'; Cocks 88'	Report		Stadium: Drayton Beaumont Park; Attendance: 495; Referee: Christopher Cooper

19 April 2025	Stafford Town	5–4	Sandbach United	Stafford
15:00	Mazurkiewicz 7'; Williams 19'; Hearsay 63'; Van Der Laan 82'; Hunter 90+1'	Report	Kennerley 2'; 18' (o.g.); Nolan 80'; Bevan 90+2'	Stadium: Evans Park; Attendance: 283; Referee: Lewis Gerrard

==== Final ====
26 April 2025	Abbey Hulton United	2–2 (3–0 p)	Stafford Town	Abbey Hulton
15:00	Brown 8'; Holdham 34'	Report	Hunter 27' (pen.); Mazurkiewicz 52'	Stadium: Drayton Beaumont Park; Attendance: 561; Referee: Kyle Lord
	Penalties
	Penalty scored		Penalty missed

=== Stadia and locations ===
2026–27 First Division South: Location of clubs
Locations of the 2024–25 North West Counties Football League First Division South teams in the North West

Locations of the 2024–25 North West Counties Football League First Division South teams in the West Midlands
Locations of 2024–25 North West Counties First Division South teams (Greater Manchester)

Team	Stadium
Abbey Hulton United	Birches Head Road
Allscott Heath	Allscott Sports & Social Club
Alsager Town	Wood Park Stadium
Ashville	Villa Park, Wallasey
Barnton	Townfield
Cammell Laird 1907	Kirklands, Birkenhead
Cheadle Heath Nomads	The Heath
Eccleshall	Pershall Park
Foley Meir	Whitcombe Road
Market Drayton Town	Greenfields Sports Ground
New Mills	Church Lane
Runcorn Town	Pavilions Sports Complex
Sandbach United	Sandbach Community Football Centre
Shawbury United	New Meadow Community 3G
Stafford Town	Evans Park
Stockport Georgians	Cromley Road
Winsford United	Barton Stadium
Wolverhampton Sporting	Pride Park

== League Challenge Cup ==
The 2024–25 League Challenge Cup (known for sponsorship reasons as the Macron Cup) was open to all 60 clubs from the Premier and First Divisions North and South (indicated in the results listings below by '(PD)', '(FDN)' and '(FDS)' respectively). The final, played at Accrington Stanley F.C., was won 6-2 by Premier Division club Charnock Richard who defeated Stafford Town of the First Division South. The six goals scored by Charnock Richard was the most scored by a single team over ninety minutes in the final of the competition. It was the second occasion Charnock Richard had won the cup; for Stafford Town it was their third losing league competition final of the season having previously been beaten in both the First Division South promotion play-off final and the First Division Trophy final.

In the initial draw for the competition the cup holders together with the three highest-ranked clubs in the 2023–24 Premier Division that didn't achieve promotion were allocated byes to the second round. For the first two rounds clubs were drawn into four regional groupings: Group 1 comprised sixteen clubs; Group 2 featured fifteen clubs of whom Barnoldswick Town, as cup holders, received a first round bye; Group 3 initially comprised fifteen clubs including Charnock Richard, one of the previous season's highest placed clubs who had a bye to the second round – also, owing to FC Isle of Man withdrawing from the first round Ashton Athletic also progressed directly to the second round; Group 4 comprised fourteen teams including two of the previous season's highest placed clubs Bury and Chadderton who received byes to the second round.

=== First round ===
Tie	Home team (division)	Score	Away team (division)
Group One
1	Barnton (FDS)	1–1 (5–3 p)	Runcorn Town (FDS)
2	Eccleshall (FDS)	1–1 (3–4 p)	Cammell Laird 1907 (FDS)
3	Glossop North End (PD)	2–2 (4–3 p)	Abbey Hulton United (FDS)
4	Market Drayton Town (FDS)	2–1	Alsager Town (FDS)
5	Shawbury United (FDS)	1–6	Allscott Heath (FDS)
6	Stafford Town (FDS)	3–0	Ashville (FDS)
7	Winsford United (FDS)	2–0	Sandbach United (FDS)
8	Wolverhampton Sporting (FDS)	1–4	Foley Meir (FDS)
Group Two
9	Darwen (FDN)	2–4	Nelson (FDN)
10	Euxton Villa (FDN)	1–0	Bacup Borough (FDN)
11	Garstang (FDN)	1–10	Padiham (PD)
12	Longridge Town (PD)	1–1 (4–3 p)	Holker Old Boys (FDN)
13	Route One Rovers (FDN)	1–3	AFC Blackpool (FDN)
14	Squires Gate (PD)	2–4	Steeton (FDN)
15	Thornton Cleveleys (FDN)	2–4	Colne (PD)
Group Three
16	AFC Liverpool (PD)	3–0	South Liverpool (PD)
17	Ashton Town (FDN)	2–1	Atherton Laburnum Rovers (FDN)
18	Burscough (PD)	4–1	Daisy Hill (FDN)
19	FC Isle of Man (PD)	x–W	Ashton Athletic (FDN)
19	FC Isle of Man withdrew, Ashton Athletic progressed to second round		
20	FC St Helens (PD)	2–1	Litherland REMYCA (PD)
21	Pilkington (PD)	1–2	Lower Breck (PD)
22	Skelmersdale United (FDN)	0–2	Maghull (FDN)
Group Four
23	Cheadle Town (PD)	1–2	Stockport Georgians (FDS)
24	Droylsden (FDN)	4–0	Abbey Hey (PD)
25	New Mills (FDS)	1–2	Cheadle Heath Nomads (FDS)
26	Prestwich Heys (PD)	2–2 (4–2 p)	Irlam (PD)
27	Stockport Town (PD)	5–4	Maine Road (FDN)
28	West Didsbury & Chorlton (PD)	2–2 (3–5 p)	Ramsbottom United (PD)

=== Second round ===
Tie	Home team (division)	Score	Away team (division)
Group One
1	Allscott Heath (FDS)	2–2 (5–6 p)	Stafford Town (FDS)
2	Barnton (FDS)	7–1	Cammell Laird 1907 (FDS)
3	Market Drayton Town (FDS)	4–0	Foley Meir (FDS)
4	Winsford United (FDS)	4–0	Glossop North End (PD)
Group Two
5	AFC Blackpool (FDN)	4–1	Barnoldswick Town (PD)
6	Euxton Villa (FDN)	1–0	Colne (PD)
7	Padiham (PD)	1–1 (4–2 p)	Longridge Town (PD)
8	Steeton (FDN)	2–3	Nelson (FDN)
Group Three
9	AFC Liverpool (PD)	1–3	Ashton Athletic (FDN)
10	Ashton Town (FDN)	3–4	Charnock Richard (PD)
11	Maghull (FDN)	3–2	Burscough (PD)
12	FC St Helens (PD)	1–2	Lower Breck (PD)
Group Four
13	Bury (PD)	3–4	Chadderton (PD)
14	Prestwich Heys (PD)	1–0	Cheadle Heath Nomads (FDS)
15	Ramsbottom United (PD)	1–0	Stockport Georgians (FDS)
16	Stockport Town (PD)	0–3	Droylsden (FDN)

=== Third round ===
The groupings from the previous rounds were discontinued from this round

Tie	Home team (division)	Score	Away team (division)
1	Barnton (FDS)	3–2	Market Drayton Town (FDS)
2	Chadderton (PD)	5–2	Euxton Villa (FDN)
3	Droylsden (FDN)	1–5	Charnock Richard (PD)
4	Lower Breck (PD)	5–1	Nelson (FDN)
5	Maghull (FDN)	4–1	Ashton Athletic (FDN)
6	Padiham (PD)	0–2	AFC Blackpool (FDN)
7	Prestwich Heys (PD)	0–5	Ramsbottom United (PD)
8	Winsford United (FDS)	1–3	Stafford Town (FDS)

=== Quarter-finals ===
All the ties in the round pitched First Division clubs against Premier Division opposition; the two First Division South clubs and one of the two First Division North club were victorious with the other tie's result in favour of the now only surviving Premier Division club.

Tie	Home team (division)	Score	Away team (division)
1	Barnton (FDS)	3–2	Lower Breck (PD)
2	Chadderton (PD)	4–4 (3–4 p)	AFC Blackpool (FDN)
3	Charnock Richard (PD)	5–1	Maghull (FDN)
4	Ramsbottom United (PD)	1–2	Stafford Town (FDS)

=== Semi-finals ===
The two remaining First Division South clubs were drawn into different ties from which one, Stafford Town, progressed; the other was won by the sole remaining Premier Division club, Charnock Richard.

Tie	Home team (division)	Score	Away team (division)
1	AFC Blackpool (FDN)	0–2	Stafford Town (FDS)
2	Charnock Richard (PD)	1–0	Barnton (FDS)

=== Final ===
5 May 2025	Charnock Richard (PD)	6–2	Stafford Town (FDS)	Accrington
15:00 BST	William Riding 8'; Louis Holt 23'; Matthew Davies 54'; Jordan Darr 81'; Fenton Davies 84'; Nathan Nickeas 90+5'	Report	Matthew Hearsey 42'; Patryk Mazurkiewicz 44'	Stadium: Accrington Stanley F.C. (Wham Stadium, Crown Ground); Attendance: 607; Referee: Jon Ashworth-Sears

source: "League Challenge Cup Results: 2024/25 Season". nwcfl.com.

== First Division Trophy ==
The 2024–25 First Division Trophy (known as the Edward Case Cup, the name of the trophy) was open to all 36 clubs from the First Divisions North and South. The final, played at FC St Helens, was won by First Division North club Atherton Laburnum Rovers who defeated First Division South club Stafford Town 3–0. For Atherton Laburnum Rovers it was the second of three titles: they had won the First Division North and would go on to be victorious in the First Division Champions Cup; for Stafford Town it was the first of three defeats in finals as they would also be defeated in the First Division South play-off final and the League Challenge Cup final.

Until the Quarter-finals the competition was organised in North and South sections (per the divisions). It commenced with a preliminary round for eight clubs, four each from the North and South divisions which comprised the three newly promoted clubs and those with lowest league positions from the 2023–24 season.

=== Preliminary round ===
Tie	Home team	Score	Away team
North Group
1	Maghull	5–2	Thornton Cleveleys
2	Nelson	x–W	Garstang
2	Match awarded to Garstang: Nelson won 6-0 but disqualified (ineligible player)		
South Group
3	New Mills	2–2 (3–4 p)	Foley Meir
4	Winsford United	7–0	Market Drayton Town

=== First round ===
Tie	Home team	Score	Away team
North Group
1	Atherton Laburnum Rovers	4–1	Steeton
2	Daisy Hill	1–0	Skelmersdale United
3	Droylsden	4–1	AFC Blackpool
4	Holker Old Boys	1–0	Darwen
5	Maghull	1–1 (6–7 p)	Ashton Town
6	Maine Road	3–1	Bacup Borough
7	Garstang	0–2	Euxton Villa
8	Route One Rovers	3–0	Ashton Athletic
South Group
9	Abbey Hulton United	3–1	Shawbury United
10	Allscott Heath	0–3	Sandbach United
11	Ashville	2–1	Eccleshall
12	Cammell Laird 1907	0–8	Stockport Georgians
13	Cheadle Heath Nomads	2–0	Alsager Town
14	Runcorn Town	1–3	Barnton
15	Stafford Town	3–0	Wolverhampton Sporting
16	Winsford United	2–1	Foley Meir

=== Second round ===
Tie	Home team	Score	Away team
North Group
1	Daisy Hill	1–2	Holker Old Boys
2	Droylsden	2–3	Euxton Villa
3	Maine Road	3–1	Ashton Town
4	Route One Rovers	1–2	Atherton Laburnum Rovers
South Group
5	Ashville	2–1	Barnton
6	Sandbach United	1–2	Cheadle Heath Nomads
7	Stockport Georgians	0–0 (8–9 p)	Stafford Town
8	Winsford United	0–2	Abbey Hulton United

=== Quarter-finals ===
The Quarter-finals saw the end of the separation of clubs into North and South groups; their previous grouping is indicated in the results listings below by '(N)' or '(S)' respectively appended to their name. Each of the four ties featured a North and a South Division club, with two from each section progressing to the semi-finals.

Tie	Home team (division)	Score	Away team (division)
1	Abbey Hulton United (S)	1–3	Holker Old Boys (N)
2	Ashville (S)	2–2 (5–3 p)	Euxton Villa (N)
3	Cheadle Heath Nomads (S)	0–4	Atherton Laburnum Rovers (N)
4	Stafford Town (S)	7–4	Maine Road (N)

=== Semi-finals ===
The draw for the semi-finals paired the two northern division clubs together and the two southern division clubs together which ensured a North versus South Division final.

Tie	Home team (division)	Score	Away team (division)
1	Holker Old Boys (N)	1–2	Atherton Laburnum Rovers (N)
2	Stafford Town (S)	3–0	Ashville (S)

=== Final ===
21 April 2025	Atherton Laburnum Rovers (N)	3–0	Stafford Town (S)	St. Helens
15:00 BST	Cal Hunter 67', 78'; Ryan Talbot 89'	Report		Stadium: FC St Helens (Windleshaw Sports); Attendance: 405; Referee: Ben Cotton

source: "Edward Case Cup Results: 2024/25 Season". nwcfl.com.

== First Division Champions Cup ==
The 2024–25 First Division Champions Cup was contested by the champions of each of the First Divisions North and South. In the final played at Winsford United (the participant with the best record over the league season) the winners were First Division North champions Atherton Laburnum Rovers.

19 April 2025	Winsford United (S)	2–3	Atherton Laburnum Rovers (N)	Winsford
15:00 BST	Oliver Pope 34'; Leandro Tanswell Vargas 87'	Report	Brandon Dawson 59'; Cal Hunter 74'; Harvey Sample 84'	Stadium: Barton Stadium; Attendance: 291; Referee: J Cliffe

source: "First Division Champions Cup Results: 2024/25 Season". nwcfl.com.
