= Danny Ventre =

English footballer (born 1986)

Personal information
- Full name: Daniel James Ventre
- Date of birth: 23 January 1986 (age 40)
- Place of birth: Liverpool, England
- Position: Midfielder

Team information
- Current team: Livingston (assistant head coach)

Senior career*
Years	Team	Apps	(Gls)
2005	Chester City	0	(0)
2005–2007	Accrington Stanley	18	(0)
2006	→ Southport (loan)	3	(0)
2007–2013	Sligo Rovers	194	(7)
2014	Derry City	15	(0)
2015	AFC Telford United	16	(1)
2015–2017	Warrington Town		
2017	Skelmersdale United		
2017–2018	Droylsden		
2018–2021	Widnes	27	(0)
2019–2020	→ MSB Woolton (dual-reg)	8	(4)
2021–2026	MSB Woolton	107	(76)

International career
2011	League of Ireland XI	1	(0)
- * Club domestic league appearances and goals as of 19:23, 2 May 2026 (UTC)

Daniel James Ventre (born 23 January 1986 in Liverpool) is an English football coach who was most recently assistant head coach of Scottish Championship side Livingston.

During his playing career he featured in the Football League for Accrington Stanley, and from 2007 to 2013 had played in the League of Ireland for Sligo Rovers.

== Career ==
=== Accrington Stanley ===
Ventre joined Accrington Stanley after a successful trial period in 2005 following his release from Chester City. He went on to appear 15 times for Accrington Stanley over the Conference winning season at the age of 19. After Promotion to the Football League he earned a one-year contract. Ventre could not force his way into the first team so went out on a one-month loan to Southport playing three games. He was recalled back to Accrington Stanley where he broke into the first team. He played four games before he took a bad fall in a game against Bury on Boxing day 2006 fracturing his left leg. He was out injured for 10 weeks. Ventre appeared once more time for Stanley, before being released to find regular first team football.

=== Sligo Rovers ===
Ventre joined Sligo Rovers in July 2007 and made his debut against Shamrock Rovers, which Sligo Rovers went on to win 2–0. He scored his first goal for the Bit o' Red against Cobh Ramblers earlier this season scoring Sligo's second goal in a 3–1 victory. Ventre has captained the team on many occasions including in the 2009 FAI Cup final defeat and was one of three players that captained the club during the 2010 season who lifted both the FAI Cup and League of Ireland Cup trophies. The fans voted him as their player of the year for the 2009 season. His first goal came against Shelbourne in the previous round of the League Cup, while his first league goal came against Bray Wanderers in September. The 2012 season saw him captain Sligo Rovers to their first title in 37 years.

=== Derry City ===
Ventre then joined Derry City from Sligo Rovers on 18 December.

=== AFC Telford United ===
Danny joined AFC Telford United on 27 January 2015 until the end of the season.

=== Later career ===
Later in his career he played for Warrington Town, Skelmersdale United, Droylsden and Widnes.

Having made seven league appearances in his first season for Widnes, Ventre was a regular throughout the 2019-20 season, adding another seventeen appearances, while also making eight appearances and scoring four goals for MSB Woolton in the amateur Liverpool Premier League. Returning to Widnes for the 2020-21 season, Ventre made another three league appearances before the season was curtailed.

When the Liverpool Premier League resumed in April 2021, Ventre returned to MSB Woolton, where he was ever-present until the end of the season in June, making ten league appearances, scoring eight goals. During the following season, he added another twelve appearances and four goals, scoring nine goals in 20 league games in the 2022-23 season, and making fifteen appearances, with fourteen goals, in the 2023-24 season. He improved his goalscoring record in the 2024-25 season, scoring 21 goals in 20 appearances as the club gained promotion to the North West Counties League for the first time, and continued to be a regular fixture in the 2025-26 season, winning the Division One North Player of the Month award for January 2026.

== Coaching career ==
In November 2020, Ventre was appointed first-team coach at Widnes where he combined this role with his existing role as a player. Ventre also held the role of Blackpool Under-18s manager alongside this role.

In July 2022, Ventre was appointed as first-team coach at Bristol Rovers. Following the departure of Joey Barton and subsequent appointment of Matt Taylor, he departed the club in December 2023.

John Coleman appointed Ventre as his assistant manager at Waterford in May 2025. The pair were dismissed just four months later after winning only four of their 21 games in charge.

Ventre was appointed as assistant head coach at Livingston in July 2026, working under Glenn Whelan, but the pair lasted only two months and were relieved of their duties on 6 September.

== Honours ==
Accrington Stanley

- Conference National (1): 2005–06

Sligo Rovers

- League of Ireland (1): 2012
- FAI Cup (3): 2010, 2011, 2013
- League of Ireland Cup (1): 2010

== Career statistics ==
=== Club ===
Correct as of 7 November 2011.

Season	Club	League	League		FAI Cup		League Cup		Europe		Setanta Cup		Total	
Season	Club	League	Apps	Goals	Apps	Goals	Apps	Goals	Apps	Goals	Apps	Goals	Apps	Goals
2007	Sligo Rovers	League of Ireland	11	0	2	0	0	0	0	0	0	0	13	0
2008	Sligo Rovers	League of Ireland	30	1	1	0	2	0	0	0	0	0	33	1
2009	Sligo Rovers	League of Ireland	29	1	7	0	3	0	2	0	1	0	42	1
2010	Sligo Rovers	League of Ireland	27	1	4	0	3	0	0	0	2	1	36	2
2011	Sligo Rovers	League of Ireland	23	1	5	0	3	2	1	0	3	0	35	3
2012	Sligo Rovers	League of Ireland	25	0	1	0	3	0	2	0	4	0	35	0
Total	Sligo Rovers	League of Ireland	145	4	20	0	14	2	5	0	10	1	194	7
