= TCFC =

TCFC may refer to:

- Tadley Calleva F.C.
- Thorne Colliery F.C.
- Those Characters From Cleveland
- Truro City F.C.
- Tuam Celtic F.C.
- Thornton Cleveleys F.C.
