= City of Liverpool F.C. =

Association football club in England

Coordinates: 53°17′46.683″N 2°56′24.5826″W

City of Liverpool FC
- Full name: City of Liverpool Football Club
- Nickname: The Purps
- Founded: 2015
- Ground: Heron Eccles Hub
- Chairman: Paul Manning
- Manager: Caleb Jones
- League: Liverpool County Premier League Premier Division
- 2025–26: North West Counties League Premier Division, 24th of 24 (resigned)
- Website: https://www.pitchero.com/clubs/cityofliverpoolfc
Home colours	Away colours

City of Liverpool Football Club is an English fan-owned association football club formed in 2015. It is currently a member of Liverpool County Premier League Premier Division.

== History ==
=== Formation and league application ===
The first meeting that led to the formation of the club was proposed in October 2014 by Paul Manning; also present at that first meeting were Peter Furmedge, Kevin Morland, and Nicky Allt. Names including "Liverpool City FC" and "Merseyside FC" were considered before the club was officially established in May 2015 as "City of Liverpool FC". The club chose to play in the colour purple due to its reputation as the "civic colour" of the city, because the city's two most famous football teams are Everton FC, whose colour is blue, and Liverpool FC, whose colour is red.

Due to work commitments and other issues, Allt and Morland had left the venture by December 2014, and Stuart Fitzgerald joined the remaining committee members in February 2015. The club held an open public meeting in September 2015. The community voted to form the club as a community benefit society on socialist principles and the club held its first members' meeting at Jack Jones House in Liverpool city centre in February 2016.

Simon Burton, formerly of Runcorn Town, was appointed as the first manager of the club in March 2016. The club applied to join the North West Counties Football League in early 2016, but their application was rejected by the Football Association in May and they were instead placed in the Liverpool County Premier League. They chose to take up their option to appeal against the decision, particularly in light of the league being left with a vacancy following the resignation of Northwich Manchester Villa, and attended an appeal hearing at Wembley Stadium on 8 June 2016. The appeal was successful, allowing the club to join the First Division of the North West Counties Football League for the 2016–17 season.

=== 2016–2019: North West Counties years ===
The club played their first game away to Prestatyn Town of the Cymru Alliance on 9 July 2016 in a pre-season friendly, which resulted in a 3–2 win. An unbeaten start throughout August in the NWCFL inaugural season boded well for the season, until a 2–1 defeat at Daisy Hill in early September. However, a 2–1 win away to Whitchurch Alport in November saw the team reach the top of the league and they remained in the promotion race until late into the season. The club missed out on automatic promotion in the end, but secured a place in the playoffs after finishing fourth. In December 2016, the club secured a two and a half year sponsorship agreement with local social housing provider Regenda Homes.

The club reached two cup finals in their first campaign, defeating Widnes 4–0 on aggregate to reach the final of the NWCFL First Division Challenge Cup, and then overturning a two-goal deficit against Chadderton before eventually winning a penalty shoot-out to reach the final of the NWCFL League Challenge Cup. They faced Sandbach United in the First Division Challenge Cup final on 1 May 2017 in Runcorn; Jamie McDonald scored the only goal of the match, which led the club to win its first ever trophy. They defeated Whitchurch Alport 1–0 in the playoff semi-final and beat neighbours Litherland REMYCA 3–0 in the final, also facing Premier Division side Barnoldswick Town in the final of the League Challenge Cup and winning the game 3–2 on penalties, despite having two players sent off. The match finished 1–1 aet. City of Liverpool FC became second team in the history of the North West Counties League to win the Cup double after Cammell Laird did the same in season 2004–05.

At the NWCFL AGM held at the Imperial Hotel in Blackpool on 17 June 2017, Simon Burton was awarded the title of "1st Division Manager of the Year" and Stephen Longrigg was awarded the title of "1st Division Goalkeeper of the Year". On 10 May 2017, the club was awarded the title of "Non-League Team of the Season" by bookmaker Coral. The club held its first annual AGM in July 2017, at which the existing board of directors was voted to remain in place for a period of three years.

The 2017–18 season started with another trophy, beating Atherton Collieries 4–3 on penalties after a 3–3 draw in 90 minutes, in the annual Champions Cup game between the Premier Division Champions and Challenge Cup winners. On 5 August, the club travelled away to fellow Premier Division side Padiham for its first-ever game in the FA Cup, which City of Liverpool won. On 1 September, the first FA Cup run came to an end with a 95th-minute winner handing Nantwich Town a 2–1 victory in front of a record crowd of 1,022.

In the FA Vase, the club progressed to the third round before being beaten by Stockton Town of the Northern League, who themselves went all the way to the final at Wembley Stadium. The season concluded with a creditable fourth place finish in the Premier Division. In July 2018, the club announced that it had parted ways with manager Simon Burton by mutual consent after two years in charge. Two days later, the club announced that it had appointed veteran centre-half Craig Robinson as manager.

On 14 July, the club travelled to Merthyr Town of the Southern League to play for the prestigious Supporter's Direct Shield, losing 3–1 in what was new manager Craig Robinson's first full game in charge. After a debut season, Robinson led the team to its first title success, winning the North West Counties Football League Premier Division with 91 points. At various points of the season, the title seemed to be a formality, but with rivals (and landlords) Bootle FC going on an unprecedented 20-game winning run in the league, culminating in a 1–0 victory over COLFC in front of a record crowd of 1,344, the team dropped to second place in the table.

A 2–0 away victory at Irlam on the last day of the season, as Bootle drew 1–1 at home with Northwich Victoria, saw the lead change hands again and City of Liverpool crowned champions. In the FA Cup, the team reached the second qualifying round before losing to Chester FC of the Conference North in front of the club's record crowd of 1,834. In the FA Vase, a disappointing 0–4 away loss at Hebburn Town in front of yet another record crowd, this time 1,304, ended the club's hopes in the first round.

Having beaten Avro FC 6–2 on aggregate in the Macron Cup Semi Finals, City of Liverpool FC met 1874 Northwich in the final on 4 May at Altrincham FC. 1874 scored an 88th-minute winner.

At the NWCFL AGM on 15 June, Robinson was named as Premier Division Manager of the Year. On the same day, the club was officially accepted into the Northern Premier League for the 2019–20 season.

=== 2019–2025: Northern Premier League years ===
The club's inaugural season in the Northern Premier League saw the club adapting to life in Step 4 of the non-League Pyramid.

In the pre-season, the club once again won the NWCFL Champions Cup, beating 1874 Northwich with a 2–1 home win. In the FA Cup, the club's first qualifying round game at Warrington Town saw a 2–2 draw, sending the tie to a replay where, in front of a record home crowd of 1,099, City of Liverpool were defeated 4–0. The club fared better in the Liverpool Senior Cup with a 5–1 home win over divisional rivals Widnes and a 2–0 win over Everton U23's securing a home semi-final draw with landlords Bootle. In the league, a seven-match unbeaten run saw the club head the form table early in the season, but a series of heavy defeats were soon to follow as the club hovered around lower mid-table. A discrepancy in a loan signing subsequently saw the club deducted six points in February, just before the entire season was scrapped due to the COVID-19 pandemic and subsequently declared null and void.

Following a disappointing start to the 2020–21 season, Robinson departed as manager with the club bottom of the division, who was then replaced by Michael Ellison. However, due to the COVID-19 pandemic, the season was curtailed early by the FA. Prior to the end of the season, City of Liverpool defeated Buxton in the FA Trophy before being eliminated 2–0 by National League North side Darlington. The season was one of mid-table stability with club finishing in ninth position. The season was affected by a spate of season ending injuries to key players, culminating in the club signing 55 players throughout the season. The club achieved its best FA Cup run to date, reaching the third qualifying round before being eliminated by Buxton.

The 2022–23 season saw Michael Ellison was relieved of his duties after a defeat to Bootle. being replaced by Paul McNally. The club also brought in former Football League player Kevin Ellison.

In the 2023–24 season, the club reached the playoff final of the Northern Premier League West Division but were defeated 2-0 by Prescot Cables. The club reached the final of the Liverpool Senior Cup but were defeated by Marine.

In the 2024–25 season, the club finished on the bottom of the table and were relegated back to the North West Counties League.

=== 2025–2026: Return to, and exit from, the North West Counties League ===
The 2025-26 season saw the club return to the NWCFL Premier Division. The club finished bottom of the table, and with only four league wins and a -149 goal difference were relegated for a second successive season.

=== 2026 - Liverpool Premier League ===
Having failed to find a suitable groundshare for the 2026–27 season, the club was not included in the North West Counties first division structure.

== Ground ==
City of Liverpool originally intended to play within Liverpool itself from the start, but suitable facilities did not exist at the time the club was formed, so they were forced to explore other venues. In December 2015, the club agreed a deal with Bootle that saw them ground-share in neighbouring Sefton for the 2016–17 and 2017–18 seasons while they continued to search for a permanent home within the city.

In February 2018, the club was granted a period of exclusivity on a site in Fazakerley by Liverpool City Council, the owners of the site. The site at Fazakerley Playing Fields was in a state of disrepair, but the club believed that it could build a 3,000-seat community stadium on the site As part of the stadium announcement, the club also announced that they had signed a further three-year ground-share agreement with Bootle FC. that can take them to the end of the 2020–21 season.

In March 2021, an announcement from the club informed the supporters that the ground-share agreement with Bootle had expired and the club had entered into a two-year ground-share agreement with Vauxhall Motors in Ellesmere Port, Cheshire.

In June 2021, the club informed members that it was in the pre-planning process with Liverpool City Council to construct a ground in Fazakerley.

In March 2022, the club announced that they would play their home games for the 2022–23 season back at Bootle, after instigating the one year break clause with Vauxhall.

In February 2024, Bootle announced that they had terminated the agreement allowing City of Liverpool to be tenants at Bootle, citing breaches of contract on the part of City of Liverpool. The club disputed the allegations. For the remainder of 2023–24 season, the club played their games at DCBL Stadium, Widnes and the Van Eupen arena, Ellesmere Port.

In April 2024, the club reported that they had signed a two year ground-share agreement with DCBL Stadium, Widnes.

The two-year deal with Widnes was truncated, and in July 2025 the club announced a two-year groundshare deal with Burscough.

In August 2026, the club announced it had moved to the Heron Eccles Hub for the 2026/27 season.

== Ownership ==
The club was officially registered as a community benefit society in November 2015 and is owned completely by its supporters. Membership is obtained by paying an annual fee to the club (£10 for adults, £5 for concessions, and £1 for children) and entitles the owner to a single share. Members aged 16 and over also receive voting rights within the club.

Memberships had reached the 500 mark by February 2016, despite the club being without a manager or players and having not contested a single match at that point. As of May 2017, the club had 1,414 official paid up members. Club memberships are available anytime to anyone who wants to be part of the community-owned club.

According to the Mutuals Public Register, maintained by the Financial Conduct Authority, the club's registration as a community benefit society is currently being revoked. A Cancellation Notice has been issued against the registration City of Liverpool Football Club Limited (7231).

== Season-by-Season ==
Season	Division	Pos	Played	Won	Drew	Lost	GD	Points	FA Cup	FA Trophy	FA Vase
2016–17	North West Counties League Division One	4th	42	27	7	8	+74	88			First Qualifying Round, losing to Litherland REMYCA
2017–18	North West Counties League Premier Division	4th	44	25	9	10	+57	84	First Qualifying Round, losing to Nantwich Town		Third Round, losing to Stockton Town
2018–19	North West Counties League Premier Division	1st	38	29	4	5	+52	91	Second Qualifying Round, losing to Chester		First Round, losing to Hebburn Town
2019–20	Northern Premier League North West Division	†	27	9	5	13	−13	26	First Qualifying Round, losing to Warrington Town	Extra Preliminary Round, losing to Tadcaster Albion	
2020–21	Northern Premier League North West Division	†	9	3	1	5	−2	10	First Qualifying Round, losing to Morpeth Town	Second Round, losing to Darlington	
2021–22	Northern Premier League West Division	9th	38	14	11	13	-3	53	Third Qualifying Round, losing to Buxton	Second Qualifying Round, losing to Colne	
2022–23	Northern Premier League West Division	12th	38	13	7	18	−9	46	First Qualifying Round, losing to Dunston UTS	First Qualifying Round, losing to Sheffield	
2023–24	Northern Premier League West Division	5th	38	18	9	11	+22	63	Extra Preliminary Round, losing to Penistone Church	Third Round, losing to Hartlepool United	
2024–25	Northern Premier League West Division	22nd	42	3	6	33	-81	15	First Qualifying Round, losing to Witton Albion	Third Round Qualifying, losing to Macclesfield	

† Season curtailed due to coronavirus pandemic.

== Records ==
- Best FA Cup Performance: Third qualifying round, 2021–22
- Best FA Vase Performance: Third round, 2017–18
- Best FA Trophy Performance: Third Round, 2023–24
- Record home win: 8–0 vs Atherton Laburnum Rovers, 29 August 2016, NWCFL Division One
- Record away win: 0–10 vs Stockport Town, 31 December 2016, NWCFL Division One
- Record home attendance: 1,099 vs Warrington Town, 1 September 2019, FA Cup First qualifying round
- Record goalscorer: Tom Peterson (65)

== Honours ==
League

- North West Counties Football League Premier League
  - Champions: 2018–19
- North West Counties Football League First Division
  - Play-off winners: 2017

Cup

- North West Counties Football League First Division Challenge Cup
  - Winners: 2016–17
- North West Counties Football League League Challenge Cup
  - Winners: 2016–17
- Liverpool Senior Cup
  - Runners-up: 2023–24
