= Staffordshire County League =

Former association football competition

The Staffordshire County League was an English football competition based in the county of Staffordshire. It existed from at least 1957 until 2005, when it merged with the Midland League to form the new Staffordshire County Senior League, with the former County League teams forming Divisions One and Two of the new league.

== Champions ==
The champion clubs from 1989 until the league's discontinuation were as follows:

- 1989–90 – Stallington
- 1990–91 – Stallington
- 1991–92 – Foley
- 1992–93 – Cheadle Rovers
- 1993–94 – Florence
- 1994–95 – Wolstanton United
- 1995–96 – Foley
- 1996–97 – Alsager College
- 1997–98 – Abbey Hulton United
- 1998–99 – Vale Juniors
- 1999–2000 – Eccleshall
- 2000–01 – Chesterton
- 2001–02 – Stallington
- 2002–03 – Eccleshall
- 2003–04 – Holditch Miners
- 2004–05 – Fegg Hayes
