= West Didsbury & Chorlton A.F.C. =

Association football club in Greater Manchester, England

Coordinates: 53.433469°N 2.282594°W

West Didsbury & Chorlton
- Full name: West Didsbury & Chorlton Association Football Club
- Nickname: West
- Founded: 1908, as Christ Church
- Ground: Recreation Ground, Brookburn Road, Chorlton
- Capacity: 1,908
- Chairman: Steve Eckersley
- Manager: Lee Rick
- League: Midland League Premier Division
- 2025–26: North West Counties League Premier Division, 9th of 24 (transferred)
- Website: wdcfc.co.uk
Home colours	Away colours

West Didsbury & Chorlton Association Football Club is a semi-professional football club based in Chorlton-cum-Hardy, a suburb of Manchester, England. They are members of the Midland League Premier Division at Step 5 of the National League System, otherwise recognised as the ninth tier of English football.

They play home matches at The Recreation Ground, known as The Step Places Stadium for sponsorship reasons, but mostly referred to as Brookburn Road.

== History ==
The club was formed in West Didsbury in 1908 as Christ Church by a local Sunday School Superintendent. Christ Church joined the Manchester Alliance League, in which they played until 1914. For the 1920–21 season, the club changed its name to West Didsbury and joined the Lancashire and Cheshire League.

The club moved to Chorlton in 1997, changing its name to West Didsbury & Chorlton in 2003 to reflect its new location.

In 2006, they entered the Manchester League Division One, won two Murray Shields in three seasons, and were crowned champions in 2010–11, gaining promotion to the Premier Division. In the 2011–12 season, the club played in the FA Vase for the first time, and were knocked out in the Second Qualifying Round by Ashville F.C. For the 2012–13 season the club had its application to enter the North West Counties Football League Division One accepted. This was the first time the club has played at level 10 of the English football league system. The club finished 3rd in their first season at level 10 and, due to title winners Formby failing to meet required ground grading standards, West were promoted to level 9 for the 2013–14 season for the first time. They also won the NWCFL Division One Cup, defeating Abbey Hey 1–0 in the Final.

They were relegated to the NWCFL Division One South in the 2018–19 season, but won promotion back to the Premier Division in 2021–22, securing the title with a 2–1 win at Barnton in March 2022.

The FA's 2026-27 League Allocations saw West laterally transferred from the North West Counties Football League to the Midland Football League.

Since 2017/18 the club have operated a women's team, after Chorltonians Ladies became part of the club. They currently play in North West Women's Regional Football League Premier Division, having won the NWWRL Division One South title in 2017/18. There is also a women's reserve side who currently play in the Greater Manchester Women's Football League.

== Grounds ==
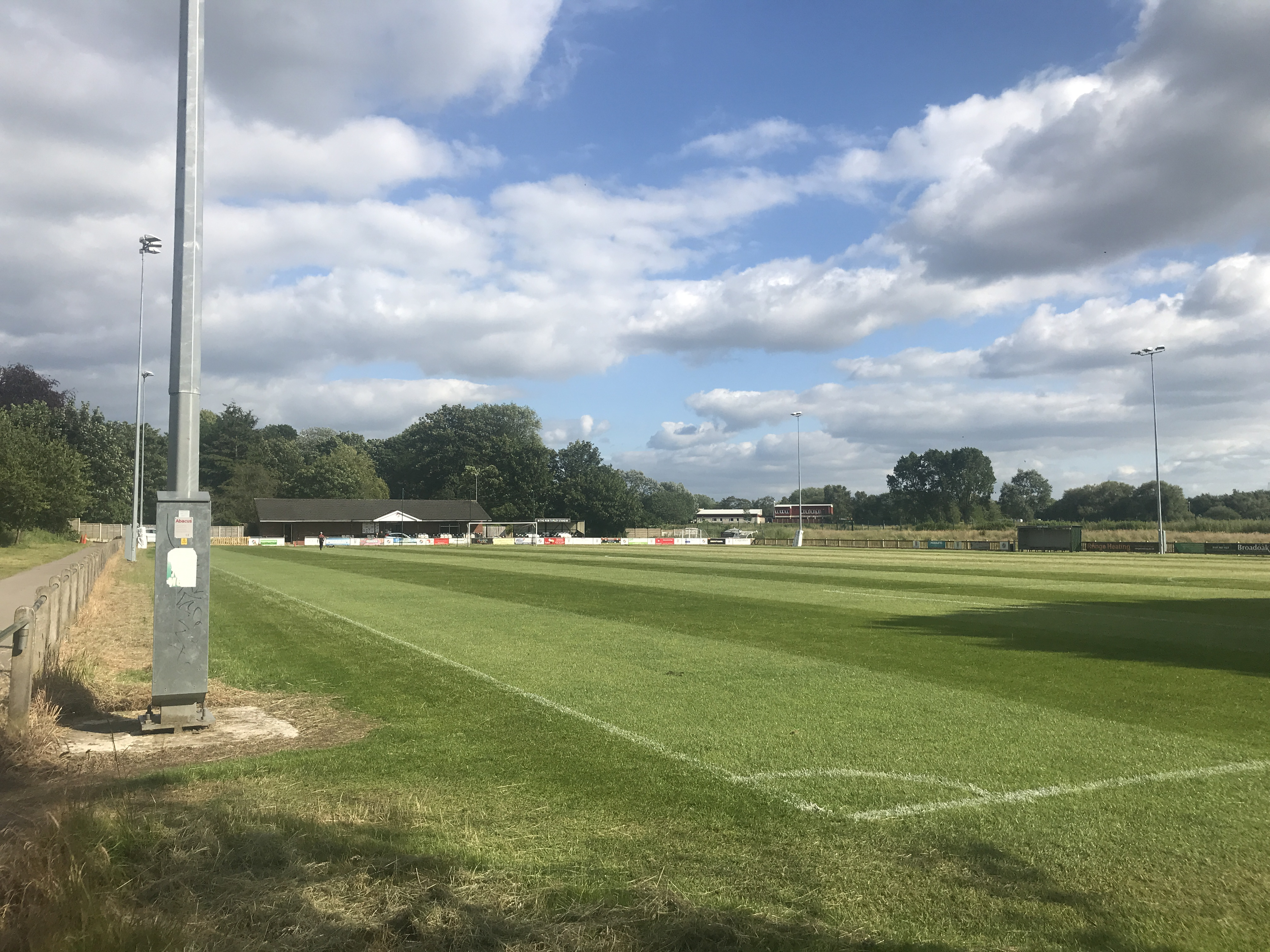
Brookburn Road during the off-season, July 2019

From 1908 until 1914, the club played at Shorts Farm on Wilmslow Road in what is now Rusholme, before moving to Christie Playing Fields. The club were evicted when this ground was sold for development in the late 1980s, with no fixed home until they moved to the then disused Recreation Ground on Brookburn Road in the Chorltonville area of Chorlton for the 1997–98 season. Since 2019, the ground has been officially known as The Step Places Stadium for sponsorship reasons.

There are two entrances to The Step Places Stadium: two pairs of turnstiles off the Brookburn Road cul-de-sac through which the majority of supporters enter, and an additional turnstile off the public footpath through Hardy Farm, which has on occasion been used as a de facto away supporter entrance.

The ground comprises standing areas around all sides of the pitch, with elevated viewing available from two stands, the clubhouse frontage and an embankment behind the dugouts. The stands are located at either end of the pitch: a 100 capacity covered seating area named the Rob Turley Stand - in honour of the club's former player and longstanding chair - and a covered standing area at the opposite end known as the Shed End. There are an additional 50 seats in front of the clubhouse, which adjoins the Rob Turley Stand.

Since 2022, the club has added further facilities to help manage larger crowds, with a purpose-built Tea Hut serving food and drink at the clubhouse end of the ground and a drinks bar at the Shed End. There is also a pop-up can bar next to the merchandise shop and a street food van, which are all open on most men's matchdays, as well as toilets at both ends of the ground.

The Step Places Stadium's capacity was 1,200 in 2022, before being lifted to 1,320 by the 2024/25 season and 1,908 for the 2025/26 season, with a new record attendance of 1,869 achieved against Wythenshawe F.C. on 26 December 2025.

The club also utilises the adjoining Hardy Farm pitches for youth team and reserve matches, and first team training.

== Colours ==
The club's home colours are white and black. As of the 2025–26 season the club's home kit feature a patterned shirt based on imagery from the West badge, black shorts, and black socks, which are manufactured by O'Neills.

The club have no set away colours, and their change kit has previously been blue, maroon, yellow, and red at different times. In 2021, a fan vote for a new away kit resulted in a pink and navy design featuring the names of supporters who donated to the club as part of the design as part of a campaign titled 'Fabric of West'. This beat variations including 'blue steel', 'purple rain', and orange, all of which would have been new away colours for the club.

The club continued with a similar colour scheme, salmon and light blue, following another vote in 2024. produced by SK Kits, with the design remaining for 2025-26 despite the change in home shirt manufacturer. The club again allowed supporters to vote for a new away kit in 2026, with a UC Sampdoria inspired design winning the poll.

West have used their kit to promote charitable causes, including Shelter at Christmas 2022,, in support of the documentary film, The Corinthians: We Were The Champions in April 2024, and for The Christie at Christmas 2024. The latter was designed in collaboration with Acid FC and fan group The SBU as part of "Piggo's Day" in honour of coach Stephen Piggott, with shirts auctioned after the game to raise funds.

== Club culture and supporters ==
The men's team crowds have rapidly increased since joining the NWCFL, growing from an average of 54 in their debut season of 2012–13 to 877 across the 2024–25 season. Average attendances had already climbed from 294 in the 2018-19 season, the final full campaign before the COVID-19 pandemic, to 697 by 2022-23. A club-record crowd of 1,869 attended a local derby against Wythenshawe F.C. on Boxing Day 2025, a figure FourFourTwo described as remarkable for a ninth-tier side.

West fans have been noted for their self-deprecating, creative & humorous chants, with songs about hummus, quinoa, vegetarianism,, and their love of Krombacher. The most vocal contingent are known as the "Krombacher Ultras", a name coined around 2013 by supporter Matthew Britton after the German beer sold at the ground, and one of several fan groups, alongside the Sensible Behaviour Unit 1908, that help organise matchday atmosphere. Terrace favourites include a reworking of Cyndi Lauper's "Girls Just Want to Have Fun", retitled "West Just Wanna Have Fun", and a version of Pulp's "Disco 2000" that marks the club's rising crowds with the line "let's all meet up when the crowd's 2,000". West fans are known for their left-wing political stance. Union chair Matthew Durrant has attributed this partly to the demographics of Chorlton-cum-Hardy, a relatively affluent, left-leaning suburb of south Manchester, noting that the fanbase skews younger than at most non-league clubs, with a gender split that is almost even. LGBT+ flags and pro-refugee flags are flown at games. EU flags and anti-fascist stickers have also featured among supporters, particularly visible around the 2016 Brexit referendum. The club promotes its inclusive outlook under the slogan "West for all", and an annual "non-league dog day" has drawn national media attention since 2017.

Indie pop band Dutch Uncles are fans of the club and have launched their albums O Shudder and True Entertainment at men's fixtures, as well as sponsoring a women's team kit.

Union 1908, an independent supporters' club with informal roots reaching back to the early 2010s, was formally established in 2020 with the aim of supporting the club on and off the field. The group have run food bank collections and fundraisers for local causes at games, including collections for the period poverty charity Every Month and funding for a young supporter's surgery. In 2020, they were responsible for the creation of a banner in solidarity with Marcus Rashford during his campaign to help feed children on free school meals, displayed during a local derby against Wythenshawe Amateurs before a further banner appeared on Jackson's Bridge in nearby Sale. and have been credited by The Athletic with spearheading the club's progressive values. Supporters have also embraced the club's women's team, formed in 2017 under a "One Club" policy that treats all sides equally, with a club-record crowd of 187 watching the side reach the first round proper of the FA Cup for the first time in 2023.

== Players ==
As of 26 July 2026.

Note: Flags indicate national team as defined under FIFA eligibility rules; some limited exceptions apply. Players may hold more than one non-FIFA nationality.

No.	Pos.	Nation	Player
—	GK	ENG	James Hodges
—	GK	ENG	Alexander Angell
—	DF	ENG	Aaron Fleming
—	DF	ENG	Markell Foulds
—	DF	GER	Joel Igwenwanne
—	DF	ENG	Johnson Opawole
—	DF	ENG	Scott Johnson
—	DF	ENG	Claudio Oliveira
—	DF	ENG	Latiq Roberts
—	DF	ENG	Chris Rowney

No.	Pos.	Nation	Player
—	MF	ENG	Joe Berks
—	MF	ENG	Brandon Dawson
—	MF	ENG	Billy Matthews
—	MF	ENG	Calum McGlynn
—	MF	ENG	Thomas Murray
—	MF	ENG	Samuel Oko
—	MF	ENG	Conal Gallager
—	MF	ENG	Kiefer Cole

No.	Pos.	Nation	Player
—	FW	ENG	Max Leonard
—	FW	ENG	Sam Dickov
—	FW	ENG	Victor Abadaki
—	FW	ENG	Lewis Billingsley
—	FW	CMR	Jacques Etia

== West Didsbury & Chorlton Women ==
West Didsbury & Chorlton announced that they would form a women's team in December 2016, taking over the registration of Chorltonians Ladies, who had previously announced their decision to fold, for the 2017/18 season. Under the stewardship of former Chorltonians manager Paul Caddick, they finished second in their debut season in the NWWRFL Division One South, whilst also reaching the semi-finals of the Manchester Women's FA Cup, and the first round proper of the Women's FA Cup. In 2018/19, they completed an unbeaten league campaign to finish first and earn promotion. The same season saw the addition of a development squad, who won the Greater Manchester Women's Football League Division 2 in their inaugural campaign. For the 2026/27 season, they were promoted to the North West Regional Football League Division 1 South.

Following Caddick's resignation in 2020, Nathan Soulby was appointed, before being replaced by Ieuan Evans in 2022, who led them to the Lancashire FA Women's Challenge Cup final in 2024, losing against Burnley F.C. Women.

The club's highest league position since promotion has been fifth in 2023/24, but they have the stated aim of reaching the FA Women's National League in the 'not too distant future'.

In 2022, the team was featured on BBC Radio 4's You and Yours as part of an investigation into injuries experienced by female footballers

== Honours ==
=== Men ===
- Manchester League Division One
  - Winners 2010–11
  - Runners-up 2009–10
- North West Counties Football League Division One South
  - Winners 2021–22
- North West Counties Football League Division One Cup
  - Winners 2013–14
- Lancashire FA Trophy
  - Runners-up 2021–22
- Lancashire and Cheshire League Division One
  - Runners-up 1922–23, 1931–32
- Lancashire and Cheshire League Division Two
  - Winners 1988–89
  - Runners-up 1952–53, 1965–66, 1970–71
- Lancashire and Cheshire League Division Two
  - Winners 1987–88
- Murray Shield
  - Winners 2007–08, 2009–10
  - Runners-up 2008–09
- Rhodes Cup
  - Winners 1926–27, 1969–70
  - Runners-up 1922–23, 1931–32
- Whitehead Cup
  - Winners 1976–77

=== Women ===
- North West Women's Regional Football League Division One South
  - Winners 2018/19

== Club records ==
- FA Cup
  - Second Qualifying Round 2024–25
- FA Vase
  - Quarter-finals 2022–23, 2025–26
- Women's FA Cup
  - First Round 2023-24

== Notable players ==
Players in this list have either played professionally, internationally or are otherwise of note before, during or after their time at West Didsbury & Chorlton.

- (England) Jeff Tate
- (Gibraltar) Jamie Coombes
- (Guinea-Bissau) Carlos Mendes Gomes
- (England) Paul Heaton
- (England) James Hooper
- (England) Remy Longdon
- (England) John Pritchard
- (Gibraltar) Jack Sergeant
- (Northern Ireland) Avilla Bergin
