= 2025–26 North West Counties Football League =

The 2025–26 North West Counties Football League season was the 44th in the history of the North West Counties Football League, a regional football competition in England.

The league comprised three divisions: the Premier Division (at level 9 of the English football league system, Step 5 National League System) and two regional divisions at level 10 or Step 6; the latter were designated the First Division North and First Division South, with the champions of each division competing in a single match for the First Division Champions Cup. Additionally, there were two cup competitions: the League Challenge Cup (known as the Macron Challenge Cup for sponsorship reasons), a knockout competition open to all the league's clubs; and the First Division Trophy (known as the Edward Case Cup, named after the trophy), a knockout trophy competition for First Division clubs only.

== Premier Division ==
North West Counties Football League Premier Division
- Season: 2025–26
- Teams: 24
- Champions: Wythenshawe
- Promoted: Wythenshawe; Padiham
- Relegated: City of Liverpool; Litherland REMYCA
- Matches: 551
- Goals: 1,996 (3.62 per match)
- Top goalscorer: (England) Lewis-Simon Byrne (Chadderton) (57 goals)
- Average attendance: 218
- All statistics correct as of 18 April 2026.

Four clubs had left the division after the previous season:

- Bury, promoted as champions to the Northern Premier League Division One West
- Colne, relegated to the First Division North
- Lower Breck, promoted as promotion play-off winners to the Northern Premier League Division One West
- Squires Gate, relegated to the First Division North

The 2025–26 Premier Division club allocations from the FA Leagues Committee (subject to appeal) were announced on 15 May 2025 and was adopted at the league's AGM on 21 June 2025. The division comprised twenty-four clubs, twenty had been members the previous season and they were joined by four additional clubs:

- Atherton Laburnum Rovers, promoted as champions of the First Division North
- City of Liverpool, relegated from Northern Premier League Division One West
- Euxton Villa, the promotion play-off winners from the First Division North
- Wythenshawe, relegated from the Northern Premier League Division One West

At the end of the season champions Wythenshawe who had been relegated into the division won immediate promotion back to the Northern Premier League Division One West where they were joined by promotion play-off winners (who had finished fourth in the division) Padiham.

After the season three clubs resigned from the league: Stockport Town (citing sustainability considerations), Pilkington (who discontinued their first team) and City of Liverpool (unable to secure a ground). The latter club who had been relegated into the division at the start of the season and occupied a relegation position at its end. They had conceded more goals (187) than any previous Premier Division club (the previous high was 171 by Barnton in the 2017–18 season) and had the division all-time highest negative goal difference (−149). Owing to the resignation of Pilkington, Litherland REMYCA were reprieved from relegation. Also leaving the division, in a lateral transfer directed by the FA Leagues Committee in the 2026–27 club allocations to the Midland League Premier Division, were Cheadle Town and West Didsbury & Chorlton.

=== League table ===
Pos	Team	Pld	W	D	L	GF	GA	GD	Pts	Promotion, qualification, or relegation
1	Wythenshawe (C, P)	46	34	4	8	128	52	+76	106	Promotion to the Northern Premier; League Division One West
2	Ramsbottom United	46	29	11	6	105	46	+59	98	Qualification for the play-offs
3	Atherton Laburnum Rovers	46	30	4	12	97	45	+52	94	Qualification for the play-offs
4	Padiham (O, P)	46	29	4	13	105	62	+43	91	Qualification for the play-offs
5	Chadderton	46	28	5	13	126	66	+60	89	Qualification for the play-offs
6	Irlam	46	26	7	13	108	69	+39	85	
7	Prestwich Heys (Note: FC Isle of Man v Prestwich Heys (25 April 2026): Prestwich Heys declined to play re-arranged match, FC Isle of Man awarded a win and three points)	46	24	10	12	84	45	+39	82	
8	FC St Helens	46	22	12	12	84	55	+29	78	
9	West Didsbury & Chorlton	46	25	3	18	94	70	+24	78	Transferred to the Midland League Premier Division
10	Burscough	46	22	5	19	79	62	+17	71	
11	AFC Liverpool	46	21	8	17	90	79	+11	71	
12	Stockport Town	46	20	10	16	77	63	+14	70	Resigned from the league
13	Charnock Richard	46	19	9	18	108	83	+25	66	
14	Glossop North End	46	18	9	19	76	70	+6	63	
15	Longridge Town	46	16	9	21	86	99	−13	57	
16	South Liverpool	46	16	8	22	70	88	−18	56	
17	Euxton Villa	46	13	15	18	67	79	−12	54	
18	Cheadle Town	46	13	11	22	60	81	−21	50	Transferred to the Midland League Premier Division
19	Barnoldswick Town	46	14	8	24	70	111	−41	50	
20	FC Isle of Man	46	12	8	26	72	117	−45	44	
21	Abbey Hey	46	10	8	28	68	110	−42	38	
22	Pilkington (R)	46	9	3	34	54	148	−94	30	Resigned to the Cheshire League League Two
23	Litherland REMYCA	46	7	6	33	50	109	−59	27	Reprieved from relegation
24	City of Liverpool (R)	46	4	5	37	38	187	−149	17	Relegation to the Liverpool Premier League Premier Division

Source: NWCFL Tables, Non League Matters
Rules for classification: 1) points; 2) goal difference; 3) number of goals scored; 4) number of matches won; 5) head-to-head results
(C) Champions; (O) Play-off winners; (P) Promoted; (R) Relegated

=== Results Table ===
Home \ Away	ABB	ALV	ALR	BAR	BUR	CHA	CHR	CHT	CLV	EUX	FSH	GNE	IOM	IRL	LIT	LON	PAD	PIL	PRE	RAM	SLV	STO	WDC	WYT
Abbey Hey		0–1	1–2	1–1	0–2	2–2	1–7	1–1	4–0	1–2	0–3	2–0	1–2	1–3	6–2	1–2	1–2	3–1	2–1	0–1	2–3	0–3	1–2	1–2
AFC Liverpool	3–0		1–3	3–1	2–1	4–1	1–2	2–2	3–4	2–0	1–5	2–2	5–1	2–3	3–1	2–0	0–2	4–1	1–1	0–2	1–1	4–0	4–1	1–5
Atherton Laburnum Rovers	0–1	3–0		2–0	1–0	0–1	1–2	1–0	3–0	2–0	2–1	2–3	3–1	1–4	3–1	3–2	2–1	4–0	2–1	0–0	1–3	5–0	0–1	0–1
Barnoldswick Town	2–0	0–7	1–3		1–2	0–6	0–5	3–1	7–0	0–6	1–1	3–1	3–0	0–3	2–2	2–5	2–1	6–1	2–2	1–3	0–0	3–3	0–1	1–6
Burscough	1–1	1–1	0–2	4–2		0–3	3–1	0–1	2–1	3–0	1–2	1–2	5–0	3–0	3–0	2–1	0–2	3–1	1–1	1–0	5–2	0–3	1–0	1–4
Chadderton	5–1	0–1	0–3	3–1	1–0		1–0	3–0	8–0	2–2	4–1	3–6	6–2	1–2	2–0	1–2	2–3	6–1	1–2	3–3	7–2	2–0	1–3	3–2
Charnock Richard	1–1	2–2	2–2	3–1	2–1	2–4		5–1	4–2	2–2	2–2	1–0	5–4	3–5	3–0	3–1	2–2	4–0	1–2	1–1	4–0	1–2	0–1	2–4
Cheadle Town	3–1	2–0	1–3	2–0	0–0	1–2	1–0		2–2	1–1	0–3	0–1	3–1	1–2	0–3	2–2	2–3	2–0	0–3	1–2	4–2	1–2	0–1	0–1
City of Liverpool	2–3	1–3	0–6	0–3	1–7	0–9	0–8	2–2		0–0	1–2	0–10	1–2	0–6	0–4	2–2	0–3	3–4	0–7	0–8	1–2	0–5	1–4	1–2
Euxton Villa	5–4	0–3	0–5	2–3	0–1	0–1	2–1	1–1	4–0		1–2	3–2	3–3	2–1	3–2	1–1	2–1	1–1	1–1	0–4	3–0	1–4	1–2	0–3
FC St Helens	3–0	0–2	1–3	5–0	1–0	1–0	6–2	1–1	1–0	0–0		0–0	2–0	2–2	1–0	2–1	1–1	3–2	0–2	1–2	3–1	1–1	3–0	0–1
Glossop North End	0–1	1–1	0–2	1–1	2–2	0–3	2–0	3–1	2–2	1–1	1–3		2–3	2–1	4–1	2–1	3–1	0–4	1–2	1–2	0–1	1–2	1–2	2–2
FC Isle of Man	2–2	5–0	1–5	1–2	0–1	1–2	3–2	1–2	3–1	1–0	2–2	2–3		2–2	0–0	2–2	2–3	1–2	H/W (Note: FC Isle of Man v Prestwich Heys (25 April 2026): Prestwich Heys declined to play re-arranged match, FC Isle of Man awarded a win and three points)	4–4	3–2	0–4	1–3	2–1
Irlam	3–2	1–0	3–0	1–2	2–1	2–4	2–2	6–0	4–1	1–1	4–1	0–1	4–0		4–0	4–1	2–0	1–2	2–1	3–2	0–2	0–0	2–4	0–2
Litherland REMYCA	2–2	1–3	0–4	1–3	1–2	1–2	2–5	4–2	2–0	1–3	2–2	1–2	1–3	0–3		0–2	2–3	4–1	0–2	2–1	0–3	0–6	1–1	1–2
Longridge Town	4–5	2–3	1–0	1–2	4–2	1–7	3–1	2–0	5–0	4–3	2–1	2–1	2–5	5–1	3–0		0–2	4–0	1–1	2–2	1–1	1–2	0–4	0–1
Padiham	4–1	4–0	2–3	3–1	3–0	3–3	2–0	1–4	0–2	2–0	2–1	3–1	4–2	3–3	4–0	4–1		4–1	0–2	3–1	1–0	1–0	1–2	3–0
Pilkington	2–4	0–4	0–1	3–3	2–6	0–2	0–3	1–2	1–3	0–3	3–2	2–0	0–0	1–2	1–0	5–3	1–10		0–1	0–5	1–6	1–2	0–5	1–8
Prestwich Heys	6–0	4–0	0–0	0–2	0–2	1–0	3–3	1–1	7–0	3–1	1–0	0–2	5–0	2–0	2–1	2–0	0–2	2–0		0–3	3–0	1–0	2–1	1–2
Ramsbottom United	4–0	4–1	2–1	4–1	2–0	2–1	3–2	2–1	1–0	0–1	1–1	1–0	4–1	2–2	1–1	2–2	1–0	3–0	3–0		2–0	3–3	3–1	3–0
South Liverpool	5–3	1–1	2–1	3–1	0–3	2–3	3–0	2–2	5–0	1–1	1–2	0–2	3–1	0–3	2–1	2–2	1–0	3–1	0–2	0–2		0–3	0–1	1–3
Stockport Town	2–2	1–2	1–3	2–0	1–3	1–1	0–3	2–1	0–2	1–1	0–4	1–2	3–0	0–3	1–0	1–2	1–2	4–0	1–1	1–1	1–1		1–0	2–0
West Didsbury & Chorlton	3–1	4–3	0–1	4–0	3–1	2–3	1–4	1–2	6–1	3–3	1–1	1–2	3–2	2–5	3–0	3–0	1–2	2–5	5–2	1–3	4–0	1–3		0–1
Wythenshawe	3–1	3–1	3–3	3–0	3–1	3–1	3–0	1–3	11–1	2–0	1–4	1–1	4–0	5–1	1–2	7–1	6–2	6–1	1–1	2–0	3–1	2–1	1–0	

Source: NWCFL Premier Division Results
Legend: Blue = home team win; Yellow = draw; Red = away team win.

=== Promotion play-offs ===
The 2025–26 Premier Division promotion play-offs, contested by the clubs that finished second to fifth position in the league table, were won by Padiham who had occupied fourth position in the division.

Semi-finals
2	Ramsbottom United	0
5	Chadderton	1
3	Atherton Laburnum Rovers	0
4	Padiham	2

Final
4	Padiham	0 (Note: After extra time played)	(3 p) (Note: Penalty shoot-out)
5	Chadderton	0	(2 p)

==== Semifinals ====
25 April 2026	Ramsbottom United	0–1	Chadderton	Ramsbottom
15:00 BST		Report	Byrne 88'	Stadium: Harry Williams Riverside Stadium; Attendance: 714; Referee: Hadley Warhurst

25 April 2026	Atherton Laburnum Rovers	0–2	Padiham	Atherton
15:00 BST		Report	Brownhill 9'; Machell 39'	Stadium: Crilly Park; Attendance: 516; Referee: Daniel Seddik

==== Final ====
2 May 2026	Padiham	0–0 (a.e.t.) (3–2 p)	Chadderton	Padiham
15:00 BST		Report		Stadium: Arbories Memorial Sports Ground; Attendance: 1,210; Referee: Dylan Costello
	Penalties
	Brownhill (penalty missed); Davies (penalty missed); L Ayres (penalty scored); Roberts (penalty scored); Boyd (penalty missed); Machell (penalty scored)		Byrne (penalty scored); Barlow (penalty scored); Flynn (penalty missed); Turner (penalty missed); Lowe (penalty missed)

=== Stadia and locations ===
2025–26 Premier Division: Location of clubs Isle of Man

2025–26 Premier Division: Location of clubs (excludes FC Isle of Man)

2025–26 Premier Division: Location of clubs (Lancashire)

2025–26 Premier Division: Location of clubs (Merseyside)

2025–26 Premier Division: Location of clubs (Greater Manchester)

Team	Stadium	Location
Abbey Hey	The Abbey Stadium	Manchester (Gorton)
AFC Liverpool	Rossett Park (groundshare with Marine)	Crosby
Atherton Laburnum Rovers	Crilly Park	Atherton
Barnoldswick Town	Greenberfield Lane	Barnoldswick
Burscough	The Community Stadium	Burscough
Chadderton	MCA Stadium	Chadderton
Charnock Richard	Mossie Park	Charnock Richard
Cheadle Town	Park Road Stadium	Cheadle
City of Liverpool	The Community Stadium	Burscough
Euxton Villa	Jim Fowler Memorial Ground	Euxton
FC Isle of Man	The Bowl	Douglas
FC St Helens	Windleshaw Sports	St Helens
Glossop North End	Surrey Street	Glossop
Irlam	Silver Street	Salford (Irlam)
Litherland REMYCA	Litherland Sports Park	Litherland
Longridge Town	Mike Riding Ground	Longridge
Padiham	Arbories Memorial Sports Ground	Padiham
Pilkington	Ruskin Drive Sportsground	St Helens
Prestwich Heys	Adie Moran Park	Whitefield
Ramsbottom United	Harry Williams Riverside Stadium	Ramsbottom
South Liverpool	Jericho Lane	Liverpool (Otterspool)
Stockport Town	Stockport Sports Village	Stockport (Woodley)
West Didsbury & Chorlton	Brookburn Road	Manchester (Chorlton-cum-Hardy)
Wythenshawe	Hollyhedge Park	Manchester (Sharston)

== First Division North ==
North West Counties Football League First Division North
- Season: 2025–26
- Teams: 18
- Champions: Nelson
- Promoted: Nelson; Droylsden
- Matches: 306
- Goals: 1,096 (3.58 per match)
- Average attendance: 169

Four clubs had left the division after the previous season:

- Atherton Laburnum Rovers, promoted as champions to the Premier Division
- Euxton Villa, promoted as promotion play-off winners to the Premier Division
- Route One Rovers, reprieved from relegation, then transferred laterally to the Northern Counties East League Division One
- Skelmersdale United, relegated to the Liverpool County Premier League

The 2025–26 First Division North club allocations from the FA Leagues Committee (subject to appeal) were announced on 15 May 2025 and was adopted at the league's AGM on 21 June 2025. The division comprised eighteen clubs, fourteen had been members the previous season and they joined by four additional clubs:

- Colne, relegated from Premier Division
- Fulwood Amateurs, promoted from fourth in the West Lancashire League
- MSB Woolton, promoted as champions of the Liverpool County Premier League
- Squires Gate, relegated from Premier Division

At the end of the season champions Nelson and promotion play-off winners Droylsden (who had finished second in the division) were promoted to the Premier Division. All three clubs in the relegation positions in the table, Ashton Athletic, Garstang (for the third successive season) and Maine Road, were reprieved from relegation; the former two as their points per game ratio were better than other Step 6 relegation candidates, and the latter (Maine Road), who were initially selected for relegation, were reprieved as an indirect consequence of Pilkington resigning from the Premier Division.

=== League table ===
Pos	Team	Pld	W	D	L	GF	GA	GD	Pts	Promotion, qualification, or relegation
1	Nelson (C, P)	34	23	6	5	78	43	+35	75	Promotion to the Premier Division
2	Droylsden (O, P)	34	20	6	8	77	44	+33	66	Qualification for the play-offs
3	MSB Woolton	34	17	9	8	66	51	+15	60	Qualification for the play-offs
4	Maghull	34	16	9	9	74	55	+19	57	Qualification for the play-offs
5	Squires Gate	34	15	8	11	61	54	+7	53	Qualification for the play-offs
6	Darwen	34	14	10	10	59	50	+9	52	
7	Thornton Cleveleys	34	15	6	13	70	63	+7	51	
8	Ashton Town	34	15	6	13	47	48	−1	51	
9	Holker Old Boys	34	14	8	12	67	57	+10	50	
10	Bacup Borough	34	13	11	10	59	58	+1	50	
11	Daisy Hill	34	12	10	12	66	69	−3	46	
12	Fulwood Amateurs	34	12	9	13	70	65	+5	45	
13	Steeton	34	11	8	15	55	60	−5	41	
14	AFC Blackpool	34	11	5	18	43	59	−16	38	
15	Colne	34	8	12	14	63	74	−11	36	
16	Ashton Athletic	34	8	4	22	44	75	−31	28	Reprieved from relegation
17	Garstang	34	6	10	18	46	87	−41	28	Reprieved from relegation
18	Maine Road	34	6	3	25	51	84	−33	21	Reprieved from relegation

Source: NWCFL Tables, Non League Matters
Rules for classification: 1) points; 2) goal difference; 3) number of goals scored; 4) number of matches won; 5) head-to-head results
(C) Champions; (O) Play-off winners; (P) Promoted

=== Results Table ===
Home \ Away	ABL	ASA	AST	BAC	COL	DAI	DAR	DRO	FUL	GAR	HOL	MAG	MAI	MSB	NEL	SQU	STE	THO
AFC Blackpool		2–0	3–0	2–0	2–2	2–4	1–2	0–2	1–0	1–1	3–0	1–2	2–0	2–1	0–2	0–1	1–0	2–2
Ashton Athletic	1–2		2–3	4–0	1–3	0–2	2–2	1–4	2–2	3–0	1–2	0–2	2–1	1–4	0–2	0–2	3–2	3–1
Ashton Town	1–0	1–3		0–1	2–2	2–1	2–0	0–0	2–0	1–0	1–0	2–1	3–1	0–3	2–2	3–1	2–1	4–2
Bacup Borough	0–1	2–4	3–1		2–1	3–0	1–1	1–2	5–2	4–2	1–1	2–2	2–0	4–0	0–2	2–2	1–1	1–2
Colne	5–1	2–0	1–1	1–2		2–4	4–1	0–3	2–5	2–0	5–3	0–3	3–2	3–3	0–2	2–2	1–0	2–4
Daisy Hill	4–1	0–1	2–1	1–1	3–1		3–2	2–3	2–2	2–2	3–3	2–5	2–2	0–3	0–1	2–1	2–0	3–5
Darwen	0–2	3–1	1–0	1–1	0–0	3–2		2–3	1–1	4–0	3–3	5–2	2–1	2–1	0–2	2–1	2–0	0–0
Droylsden	2–0	3–1	2–3	6–1	2–1	2–0	2–2		1–0	2–0	0–1	2–1	2–1	0–0	3–0	2–0	1–3	0–2
Fulwood Amateurs	4–0	3–0	3–1	2–3	4–4	2–2	2–2	4–3		2–2	1–4	3–0	4–2	2–1	1–4	5–2	0–2	0–0
Garstang	3–0	2–1	2–2	1–1	3–1	1–1	2–1	2–1	1–7		3–3	2–2	6–1	2–2	1–4	0–4	0–4	1–7
Holker Old Boys	2–2	2–0	0–1	3–0	3–2	2–2	1–2	1–4	2–3	3–0		3–1	3–2	2–2	5–0	0–1	1–2	3–1
Maghull	2–2	2–2	2–1	2–2	3–1	3–0	1–1	4–3	0–3	4–0	2–1		1–0	0–0	5–1	2–2	7–0	2–0
Maine Road	2–1	4–0	1–3	0–1	3–3	2–4	0–1	0–4	3–1	1–0	1–2	1–2		5–0	4–5	1–4	1–1	3–0
MSB Woolton	3–1	2–0	2–1	4–3	3–3	2–2	2–1	4–1	3–1	3–1	0–0	4–2	5–2		1–1	3–1	0–1	2–1
Nelson	2–1	5–0	2–0	1–2	0–0	4–2	1–0	2–2	4–1	2–1	3–1	1–1	4–0	4–0		2–3	1–1	2–1
Squires Gate	3–1	2–2	1–0	1–1	1–1	2–3	2–1	1–1	3–0	5–3	0–1	2–1	1–0	1–2	3–5		2–1	0–2
Steeton	3–1	3–1	2–0	4–4	5–2	1–1	1–2	1–6	0–0	2–2	2–4	1–3	5–2	0–1	1–2	2–2		1–2
Thornton Cleveleys	3–2	3–2	1–1	1–2	1–1	2–3	3–7	3–3	1–0	4–0	3–2	5–2	5–2	1–0	1–3	1–2	0–2	

Source: NWCFL First Division North Results
Legend: Blue = home team win; Yellow = draw; Red = away team win.

=== Promotion play-offs ===
The 2025–26 First Division North promotion play-offs, contested by the clubs that finished second to fifth position in the league table, were won by Droylsden who had been runners-up of the division.

Semi-finals
2	Droylsden	2
5	Squires Gate	1
3	MSB Woolton	2
4	Maghull	4

Final
2	Droylsden	3 (Note: After extra time played, score at 90 minutes: 3–3)	(4 p) (Note: Penalty shoot-out)
4	Maghull	3	(3 p)

==== Semifinals ====
25 April 2026	Droylsden	2–1	Squires Gate	Droylsden
15:00 BST	Talbot 59'; Barnett 89'	Report	Harries 61'	Stadium: Butcher's Arms Ground; Attendance: 964; Referee: Oliver Hamilton

25 April 2026	MSB Woolton	2–4	Maghull	Woolton
15:00 BST	Smallwood 67'; Harvey 86'	Report	Moffitt 4'; Rankin 55'; Clark 78' (pen.); Smith 89'	Stadium: Simpsons Football Ground; Attendance: 295; Referee: Anthony Ross

==== Final ====
2 May 2026	Droylsden	3–3 (a.e.t.) (4–3 p)	Maghull	Droylsden
15:00 BST	Artwell 12', 80'; Cantello 68'	Report	Smith 29'; Clark 50' (pen.), 90+7'	Stadium: Butcher's Arms Ground; Attendance: 1,940; Referee: Sam Fletcher
	Penalties
	Penalty scored Penalty missed		Penalty missed Penalty scored

=== Stadia and locations ===
2025–26 First Division North: Location of clubs

2025–26 First Division North: Location of clubs (Lancashire)

2025–26 First Division North: Location of clubs (Merseyside)

2025–26 First Division North: Location of clubs (Greater Manchester)

Team	Stadium	Location
AFC Blackpool	The Mechanics	Blackpool
Ashton Athletic	Brockstedes Park	Wigan (Ashton-in-Makerfield)
Ashton Town	Edge Green Street	Wigan (Ashton-in-Makerfield)
Bacup Borough	West View	Bacup
Colne	Holt House	Colne
Daisy Hill	New Sirs	Westhoughton
Darwen	The Anchor Ground	Darwen
Droylsden	Butcher's Arms Ground	Droylsden
Fulwood Amateurs	Lightfoot Green	Preston (Fulwood)
Garstang	The Riverside	Garstang
Holker Old Boys	Rakesmoor Lane	Barrow-in-Furness
Maghull	Old Hall Field	Liverpool
Maine Road	Brantingham Road	Manchester
MSB Woolton	Jericho Lane	Liverpool
Nelson	Victoria Park	Nelson
Squires Gate	Brian Addison Stadium	Blackpool
Steeton	Marley Stadium	Keighley
Thornton Cleveleys	Gamble Road	Thornton-Cleveleys

== First Division South ==
North West Counties Football League First Division South
- Season: 2025–26
- Teams: 18
- Champions: Runcorn Town
- Promoted: Runcorn Town; Stockport Georgians
- Matches: 306
- Goals: 1,078 (3.52 per match)
- Average attendance: 109

Two clubs had left the division after the previous season:

- Abbey Hulton United, promotion play-off winners, transferred laterally to the Midland League Premier Division
- Winsford United, promoted as champions, transferred laterally to the Midland League Premier Division

The 2025–26 First Division South club allocations from the FA Leagues Committee (subject to appeal) were announced on 15 May 2025 and was adopted at the league's AGM on 21 June 2025. The division initially comprised nineteen clubs, sixteen had been members the previous season and they were joined by three additional clubs:

- Haughmond, promoted from third in the Shropshire County League
- Telford Town, promoted as champions of the West Midlands League
- Wolverhampton Casuals, relegated and transferred laterally from the Midland League Premier Division

The division lost one of its members mid-season with the resignation, effective on 3 February 2026, of Wolverhampton Sporting; their playing record (P24 W1 D2 L21 GF23 GA90) was expunged shortly afterwards.

At the end of the season champions Runcorn Town and promotion play-off winners Stockport Georgians (who had finished fourth in the division) were promoted and as decided by the FA League Committee's 2026-27 league allocations were transferred laterally to the Midland League Premier Division. After one season in the division Haughmond were the only club relegated and sent back to the Shropshire County League; Market Drayton Town who finished in a prospective relegation spot were reprieved as their points per game ratio was better than other Step 6 relegation candidates.

=== League table ===
Pos	Team	Pld	W	D	L	GF	GA	GD	Pts	Promotion, qualification, or relegation
1	Runcorn Town (C, P)	34	28	5	1	118	24	+94	89	Promotion to the Midland League Premier Division
2	Eccleshall	34	23	5	6	78	33	+45	74	Qualification for the promotion play-offs
3	New Mills	34	18	9	7	73	36	+37	63	Qualification for the promotion play-offs
4	Stockport Georgians (O, P)	34	17	12	5	73	42	+31	63	Qualification for the promotion play-offs
5	Stafford Town	34	16	9	9	77	54	+23	57	Qualification for the promotion play-offs
6	Sandbach United	34	17	5	12	57	41	+16	56	
7	Ashville	34	15	9	10	54	41	+13	54	Transferred to the First Division North
8	Telford Town	34	15	6	13	54	64	−10	51	
9	Cheadle Heath Nomads	34	13	7	14	53	57	−4	46	
10	Barnton	34	11	9	14	52	55	−3	42	
11	Foley Meir	34	11	7	16	58	66	−8	40	
12	Cammell Laird 1907	34	11	7	16	48	64	−16	40	Transferred to the First Division North
13	Allscott Heath	34	9	12	13	60	65	−5	39	
14	Wolverhampton Casuals	34	11	5	18	53	72	−19	38	
15	Shawbury United	34	9	4	21	42	93	−51	31	
16	Alsager Town	34	8	5	21	40	66	−26	29	Reprieved from relegation
17	Market Drayton Town	34	6	9	19	39	75	−36	27	Reprieved from relegation
18	Haughmond (R)	34	4	3	27	49	130	−81	15	Relegated to the Shropshire County League Premier Division
19	Wolverhampton Sporting	0	0	0	0	0	0	0	0	Resigned to the West Midlands (Regional) League Division One (Note: On 3 February 2026, Wolverhampton Sporting Community resigned from the league; their record (P24 W1 D2 L21 GF23 GA90) was expunged.)

Source: NWCFL Tables, Non League Matters
Rules for classification: 1) points; 2) goal difference; 3) number of goals scored; 4) number of matches won; 5) head-to-head results
(C) Champions; (O) Play-off winners; (P) Promoted; (R) Relegated

=== Results Table ===
Home \ Away	ALL	ALS	ASH	BAR	CAM	CHN	ECC	FOL	HAU	MDR	NEW	RUN	SAN	SHA	STA	STG	TEL	WLC
Allscott Heath		3–3	3–1	1–2	2–2	1–1	1–6	1–3	2–1	2–2	0–3	0–4	1–1	3–3	0–1	0–1	1–1	1–1
Alsager Town	2–2		1–1	0–1	1–2	2–3	0–1	0–3	4–3	1–0	1–2	0–4	0–1	2–0	0–4	0–2	0–1	0–1
Ashville	3–0	2–1		2–2	0–0	3–0	1–0	2–0	3–2	2–0	1–0	0–2	1–1	4–1	1–1	0–1	1–2	1–1
Barnton	1–1	1–1	3–1		2–2	0–0	0–3	2–1	2–1	1–2	1–2	0–2	3–1	1–2	2–2	0–0	1–2	4–2
Cammell Laird 1907	2–0	1–3	2–1	0–5		3–3	0–2	3–2	2–3	2–0	1–3	0–3	2–5	1–0	1–4	0–1	1–1	4–1
Cheadle Heath Nomads	1–4	0–2	0–1	0–2	3–1		1–2	3–0	7–0	2–3	2–1	0–1	2–0	3–2	3–2	1–0	3–1	2–1
Eccleshall	1–0	3–1	1–0	3–1	2–3	4–1		2–1	6–2	2–0	1–1	2–2	2–0	3–0	1–2	2–0	1–0	5–0
Foley Meir	2–3	2–1	2–4	1–2	2–2	1–4	2–3		4–0	2–0	1–1	1–5	1–1	2–1	1–1	1–1	2–2	2–3
Haughmond	0–5	0–3	2–2	4–3	1–2	5–0	3–3	1–4		1–5	3–5	2–4	1–9	1–2	1–2	1–6	1–4	2–3
Market Drayton Town	1–3	1–4	0–3	2–1	0–1	0–0	0–0	0–3	5–2		0–4	0–7	0–4	3–3	3–3	3–1	2–2	2–2
New Mills	1–3	1–1	2–2	4–2	1–1	1–1	2–0	1–3	8–0	3–1		0–1	1–0	7–0	0–0	0–1	5–1	3–2
Runcorn Town	3–2	6–0	0–0	3–1	2–1	1–1	4–3	5–1	8–0	4–0	2–2		1–2	6–0	6–1	3–1	12–0	4–0
Sandbach United	4–1	1–0	2–0	1–0	1–0	1–0	0–2	1–1	3–1	2–1	0–1	0–2		2–1	2–1	2–3	6–0	0–1
Shawbury United	0–6	2–3	0–3	0–3	2–1	1–1	0–5	1–3	1–3	3–2	2–0	0–2	1–0		2–6	1–1	1–3	2–5
Stafford Town	2–2	3–0	2–3	4–1	3–0	1–3	2–0	3–2	2–2	3–0	1–2	1–3	2–2	5–0		4–6	1–3	2–1
Stockport Georgians	3–3	3–1	4–1	0–0	2–1	4–1	2–2	5–1	5–0	1–1	1–1	2–2	4–0	1–2	1–1		2–2	4–4
Telford Town	2–1	2–1	0–3	2–2	3–2	4–1	0–2	0–1	3–0	1–0	0–2	0–1	3–0	1–2	0–2	0–2		3–2
Wolverhampton Casuals	1–2	4–1	3–1	3–0	0–2	2–0	1–3	2–0	3–0	0–0	0–3	1–3	1–2	1–4	0–3	1–2	0–5	

Source: NWCFL First Division South Results
Legend: Blue = home team win; Yellow = draw; Red = away team win.

=== Promotion play-offs ===
The 2025–26 First Division South promotion play-offs, contested by the clubs that finished second to fifth position in the league table, were won by Stockport Georgians who had occupied fourth position in the division.

Semi-finals
2	Eccleshall	5
5	Stafford Town	1
3	New Mills	0
4	Stockport Georgians	1

Final
2	Eccleshall	1 (Note: After extra time played, score at 90 minutes: 1–1)	(4 p) (Note: Penalty shoot-out)
4	Stockport Georgians	1	(5 p)

==== Semifinals ====
25 April 2026	Eccleshall	5–1	Stafford Town	Eccleshall
15:00 BST	Fishman 7'; Parker 10', 87'; Warren 42'; Lazenby 51'	Report	Dunkley 50'	Stadium: Pershall Park; Attendance: 323; Referee: Shaun Currall

25 April 2026	New Mills	0–1	Stockport Georgians	New Mills
15:00 BST		Report	Kyobe 23'	Stadium: Church Lane; Attendance: 465; Referee: James Gerring

==== Final ====
2 May 2026	Eccleshall	1–1 (a.e.t.) (4–5 p)	Stockport Georgians	Eccleshall
15:00 BST	Glover 10'	Report	Winthrop 90+3'	Stadium: Pershall Park; Attendance: 560; Referee: Kyle Rowlands
	Penalties
	Penalty scored Penalty missed		Penalty scored Penalty missed

=== Stadia and locations ===
2025–26 First Division South: Location of clubs

2025–26 First Division South: Location of clubs (Cheshire)

2025–26 First Division South: Location of clubs (Shropshire)

2025–26 First Division South: Location of clubs (Staffordshire)

Team	Stadium	Location
Allscott Heath	Allscott Sports & Social Club	Allscott
Alsager Town	Wood Park Stadium	Alsager
Ashville	Villa Park	Wallasey
Barnton	Townfield	Barnton
Cammell Laird 1907	Kirklands	Birkenhead
Cheadle Heath Nomads	The Heath	Cheadle
Eccleshall	Pershall Park	Stafford
Foley Meir	Whitcombe Road	Stoke-on-Trent (Meir)
Haughmond	Shrewsbury Sports Village	Shrewsbury
Market Drayton Town	Greenfields Sports Ground	Market Drayton
New Mills	Church Lane	High Peak
Runcorn Town	Viridor Community Stadium	Runcorn
Sandbach United	Sandbach Community Football Centre	Sandbach
Shawbury United	New Meadow Community 3G	Shawbury
Stafford Town	Evans Park	Stafford
Stockport Georgians	Cromley Road	Stockport (Woodsmoor)
Telford Town	DRM Aggregates Arena	Telford
Wolverhampton Casuals	Brinsford Lane	Wolverhampton
Wolverhampton Sporting	Pride Park	Great Wyrley

== League Challenge Cup ==
The 2025–26 NWCFL League Challenge Cup (known for sponsorship reasons as The Macron Cup) was open to all 61 clubs from the Premier and First Divisions North & South (indicated in the results listings below by '(PD)', '(FDN)' and '(FDS)' respectively). The final, played at Accrington Stanley F.C. and contested by Premier Division clubs, was won 3–1 by AFC Liverpool who defeated West Didsbury & Chorlton.

The cup holders, Charnock Richard, together with the two highest-ranked clubs in the 2024–25 Premier Division that didn't achieve promotion, Ramsbottom United and Padiham, were allocated byes to the second round. For the first two rounds clubs were drawn into four regional groupings: Group 1 comprised sixteen all First Division South clubs; Group 2 included fifteen clubs one of whom, Padiham, were in receipt of a first round bye; Group 3 originally comprised fifteen clubs including cup holders Charnock Richard with a first round bye however, owing to the non-participation of FC Isle of Man in the competition Maghull also passed directly to the second round; Group 4 comprised fifteen clubs including Ramsbottom United with a bye to the second round.

=== First round ===
Tie	Home team (division)	Score	Away team (division)
Group One
1	Allscott Heath (FDS)	2–1	Alsager Town (FDS)
2	Ashville (FDS)	0–1	Foley Meir (FDS)
3	Eccleshall (FDS)	3–1	Market Drayton Town (FDS)
4	Runcorn Town (FDS)	1–0	Barnton (FDS)
5	Sandbach United (FDS)	4–0	Haughmond (FDS)
6	Shawbury United (FDS)	0–2	Wolverhampton Casuals (FDS)
7	Stafford Town (FDS)	1–1 (4–5 p)	Cammell Laird 1907 (FDS)
8	Telford Town (FDS)	7–1	Wolverhampton Sporting (FDS)
Group Two
9	Bacup Borough (FDN)	0–0 (3–5 p)	AFC Blackpool (FDN)
10	Darwen (FDN)	0–0 (3–4 p)	Garstang (FDN)
11	Euxton Villa (PD)	5–0	Holker Old Boys (FDN)
12	Fulwood Amateurs (FDN)	1–1 (3–4 p)	Nelson (FDN)
13	Longridge Town (PD)	1–3	Barnoldswick Town (PD)
14	Squires Gate (FDN)	2–4	Colne (FDN)
15	Thornton Cleveleys (FDN)	4–0	Steeton (FDN)
Group Three
16	AFC Liverpool (PD)	3–1	South Liverpool (PD)
17	Ashton Athletic (FDN)	2–3	FC St Helens (PD)
18	Ashton Town (FDN)	3–4	City of Liverpool (PD)
19	Daisy Hill (FDN)	0–0 (2–4 p)	Burscough (PD)
20	Litherland REMYCA (PD)	2–2 (2–4 p)	MSB Woolton (FDN)
21	Pilkington (PD)	0–1	Atherton Laburnum Rovers (PD)
Group Four
22	Abbey Hey (PD)	2–1	Stockport Georgians (FDS)
23	Cheadle Town (PD)	3–2	Glossop North End (PD)
24	Droylsden (FDN)	1–2	Maine Road (FDN)
25	Irlam (PD)	0–3	Chadderton (PD)
26	Stockport Town (PD)	2–3	Prestwich Heys (PD)
27	West Didsbury & Chorlton (PD)	4–0	Cheadle Heath Nomads (FDS)
28	Wythenshawe (PD)	1–2	New Mills (FDS)

=== Second round ===
Tie	Home team (division)	Score	Away team (division)
Group One
1	Cammell Laird 1907 (FDS)	3–2	Wolverhampton Casuals (FDS)
2	Eccleshall (FDS)	1–3	Telford Town (FDS)
3	Foley Meir (FDS)	0–5	Sandbach United (FDS)
4	Runcorn Town (FDS)	1–0	Allscott Heath (FDS)
Group Two
5	AFC Blackpool (FDN)	3–0	Barnoldswick Town (PD)
6	Colne (FDN)	1–3	Euxton Villa (PD)
7	Garstang (FDN)	2–3	Thornton Cleveleys (FDN)
8	Padiham (PD)	0–6	Nelson (FDN)
Group Three
9	AFC Liverpool (PD)	3–1	Maghull (FDN)
10	Atherton Laburnum Rovers (PD)	1–1 (3–5 p)	Burscough (PD)
11	City of Liverpool (PD)	2–2 (1–3 p)	Charnock Richard (PD)
12	FC St Helens (PD)	0–2	MSB Woolton (FDN)
Group Four
13	New Mills (FDS)	0–1	Chadderton (PD)
14	Maine Road (FDN)	1–2	Cheadle Town (PD)
15	Ramsbottom United (PD)	3–2	Prestwich Heys (PD)
16	West Didsbury & Chorlton (PD)	4–0	Abbey Hey (PD)

=== Third round ===
From this round onwards the competition was no longer organised in regional groups. The draw comprised 8 (from an initial 23 participating) Premier Division, 4 (from 18) First Division North and 4 (from 19) First Division South clubs.

Tie	Home team (division)	Score	Away team (division)
1	Burscough (PD)	3–1	AFC Blackpool (FDN)
2	Cammell Laird 1907 (FDS)	1–3	AFC Liverpool (PD)
3	Cheadle Town (PD)	2–1	Chadderton (PD)
4	Euxton Villa (PD)	3–3 (4–3 p)	Charnock Richard (PD)
5	MSB Woolton (FDN)	0–5	Thornton Cleveleys (FDN)
6	Ramsbottom United (PD)	1–2	West Didsbury & Chorlton (PD)
7	Sandbach United (FDS)	1–3	Nelson (FDN)
8	Telford Town (FDS)	4–0	Runcorn Town (FDS)

=== Quarter-finals ===
The quarter-final draw comprised 5 Premier Division, 2 First Division North and 1 First Division South clubs. In the only all First Division level tie Nelson heavily defeated Telford Town 10–1.

Tie	Home team (division)	Score	Away team (division)
1	AFC Liverpool (PD)	3–0	Euxton Villa (PD)
2	Burscough (PD)	4–0	Cheadle Town (PD)
3	Nelson (FDN)	10–1	Telford Town (FDS)
4	West Didsbury & Chorlton (PD)	void	Thornton Cleveleys (FDN)
Original match declared void after player eligibility dispute (original result 1–1 (4–2 p) )
Replay
4	West Didsbury & Chorlton (PD)	4–1	Thornton Cleveleys (FDN)

=== Semi-finals ===
The semi-final draw comprised 3 Premier Division and 1 First Division North clubs; two Premier Division clubs progressed to the final.

Tie	Home team (division)	Score	Away team (division)
1	AFC Liverpool (PD)	3–1	Nelson (FDN)
2	Burscough (PD)	0–0 (4–5 p)	West Didsbury & Chorlton (PD)

=== Final ===
4 May 2026	AFC Liverpool (PD)	3–1	West Didsbury & Chorlton (PD)	Accrington
15:00 BST	Taylor 48', 61'; Jones 85'	Report	Elliot 66'	Stadium: Accrington Stanley F.C., Wham Stadium (Crown Ground); Attendance: 1,648

== First Division Cup ==
The 2025–26 NWCFL First Division Cup (known as The Edward Case Cup, the name of the trophy) was open to all 37 clubs from the First Divisions North and South. The final, played at Euxton Villa F.C., was won 3–2 by Runcorn Town from the First Division South who defeated Darwen from the North division.

Until the quarter-finals the competition was organised in North and South sections (per the divisions). It commenced with a preliminary round for ten clubs (4 North and 6 South First Division clubs) which comprised the four newly promoted and those with lowest league positions from the 2024–25 season.

=== Preliminary round ===
Tie	Home team	Score	Away team
North Group
1	Steeton	0–3	Fulwood Amateurs
2	MSB Woolton	5–1	Garstang
South Group
3	Shawbury United	1–3	Wolverhampton Sporting
4	Foley Meir	3–2	Allscott Heath
5	Telford Town	6–0	Haughmond

=== First round ===
Tie	Home team	Score	Away team
North Group
1	Ashton Town	4–1	Fulwood Amateurs
2	Bacup Borough	1–0	Holker Old Boys
3	Daisy Hill	2–0	Ashton Athletic
4	Darwen	4–0	Colne
5	Droylsden	1–3	AFC Blackpool
6	Nelson	2–1	MSB Woolton
7	Squires Gate	0–2	Maghull
8	Thornton Cleveleys	1–2	Maine Road
South Group
9	Alsager Town	2–4	Sandbach United
10	Ashville	2–1	Wolverhampton Casuals
11	Foley Meir	1–4	Stockport Georgians
12	New Mills	2–3	Cheadle Heath Nomads
13	Runcorn Town	1–1 (4–3 p)	Cammell Laird 1907
14	Stafford Town	5–2	Market Drayton Town
15	Telford Town	1–1 (4–3 p)	Eccleshall
16	Wolverhampton Sporting	1–1 (2–4 p)	Barnton

=== Second round ===
Tie	Home team	Score	Away team
North Group
1	Ashton Town	2–3	Darwen
2	Daisy Hill	x–W	Nelson
2	Match awarded to Nelson (original result 3–2 to Daisy Hill)		
3	Maghull	2–2 (5–4 p)	Bacup Borough
4	Maine Road	0–0 (4–2 p)	AFC Blackpool
South Group
5	Barnton	2–0	Ashville
6	Runcorn Town	2–1	Stafford Town
7	Sandbach United	2–1	Cheadle Heath Nomads
8	Telford Town	x–W	Stockport Georgians
8	Match awarded to Stockport Georgians (original result 3–0 to Telford Town)		

=== Quarter-finals ===
This round saw the end of the separation of clubs into North and South groups. Clubs from First Divisions North and South are indicated by '(N)' and '(S)' respectively in the results listings below.

Tie	Home team (division)	Score	Away team (division)
1	Barnton (S)	2–2 (2–4 p)	Darwen (N)
2	Maghull (N)	4–5	Stockport Georgians (S)
3	Nelson (N)	1–1 (4–2 p)	Maine Road (N)
4	Sandbach United (S)	1–2	Runcorn Town (S)

=== Semi-finals ===
Both ties featured clubs from each of the North and South Divisions.

Tie	Home team (division)	Score	Away team (division)
1	Darwen (N)	1–0	Stockport Georgians (S)
2	Nelson (N)	0–2	Runcorn Town (S)

=== Final ===
30 April 2026	Darwen (N)	2 – 3	Runcorn Town (S)	Euxton
19:45 BST	Bruno De Almeida Severino 51'; Joshua Abbott 76'	Report	Edward Burthem 54'; Connor Spiers 56'; Matthew Vickers 79'	Stadium: Euxton Villa F.C. (Jim Fowler Memorial Ground); Attendance: 414; Referee: Anthony Ross

== First Division Champions Cup ==
The cup is contested as a single match between the winners of the First Division North and the First Division South and played at the ground of the club with the highest points from the season. The 2025–26 First Division Champions Cup winners were the First Division South champions Runcorn Town.

25 April 2026	Runcorn Town (S)	3 – 1	Nelson (N)	Runcorn
15:00 BST	Edward Burthem 6'; Kieran Alley 37'; Liam Kennington 90+5' (pen.)	Report	Max Cane 58'	Stadium: Runcorn Town F.C. (Viridor Community Stadium); Attendance: 133; Referee: Matthew Pointer
