= Steeton A.F.C. =

Association football club in England

Coordinates: 53.897289°N 1.944670°W

Steeton AFC
- Full name: Steeton Association Football Club
- Nickname: The Chevrons
- Founded: 1905
- Stadium: Marley Stadium
- League: North West Counties Football League - Division One North
- 2025–26: North West Counties League Division One North, 13th of 18
- Website: www.steetonafc.co.uk
Home colours	Away colours

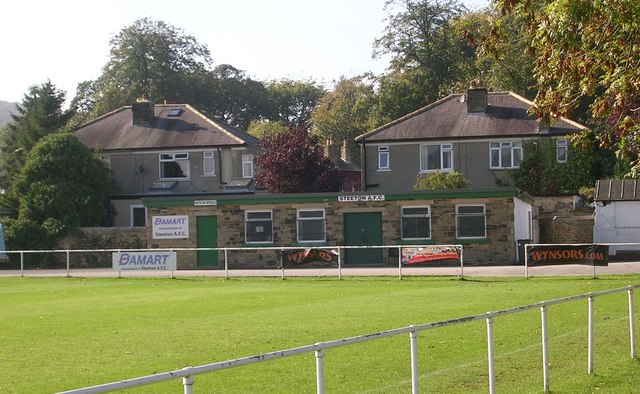
Clubhouse in Summerhill Lane

Steeton Association Football Club is an English football club based in Steeton, West Yorkshire. They are currently members of the North West Counties League Division One North and play at Marley Stadium, Keighley.

== History ==
One of the earliest iterations of a Steeton team playing organised football was in 1905, when a team called "Steeton FC" beat local side Haworth 5–0, but it was not until the 1908–09 season that league football was played in the village, with "Steeton Church Lads Brigade" entering the Keighley & District League.

The following season saw another "Steeton FC" emerge, this side playing in the 2nd division, but by 1910–11 only one Steeton FC existed, with a merger believed to have taken place between the two sides. The club continued to compete in the Keighley & District league until the 1960s when a move to the Craven League took place, and not long after this, the club moved from its ground at The Oaks to Summerhill Lane.

By the 1990s Steeton AFC were competing in the West Riding County Amateur Football League, earning promotion from the 3rd division to the 1st division (which was renamed the Premier Division around this time) between the 1999–2000 and 2002–03 seasons, and picking up the West Riding FA County Trophy in 2001–02. Relegation followed in 2004–05, but in 2009–10 (by this time under the management of current first-team manager Roy Mason) Steeton won the 1st Division title to regain promotion, and in 2012–13 finished Runners-up in the Premier Division. 2013–14 saw Steeton reach the final of the West Riding County Cup at Elland Road, Leeds, losing out to Bradford-based side Field FC. In the club's final season as an amateur outfit, Steeton finished 3rd in the league and won the League Cup and the Keighley Cup.

The 2018–19 season saw the beginning of a new era at Steeton AFC. After applying for and being accepted for promotion to the North West Counties Football League, "The Chevrons" moved first-team action to Cougar Park in Keighley, in order to meet the ground requirements for the league, and also entered the FA Vase for the first time, winning their first ever game 2–1 away at Northallerton. The 2020–21 season saw another ground move, this time to the football-only facility at Marley, Keighley.

== Honours ==
West Riding County Amateur Football League;

WRCFA Trophy: Winners - 2011–02

WRCFA Challenge Cup: Runners-up - 2016–17

Premier Division: Runners-up - 2012–13. Premier Division Cup: Runners-up - 2012–13

First Division: Winners - 2009–10. First Division Cup: Winners - 2002–03, 2005–06.

Second Division: Winners - 1988–89. 2000–01. Second Division Cup: Winners - 1988–89

Keighley & District League: Winners - 1937–38, 1938–39, 1954–55.

Keighley & District FA Challenge Cup: Winners - 1988–89, 1992–93, 2010–11, 2012–13, 2017–18

Craven District League: Winners - 1959–60
