= MSB Woolton F.C. =

Association football club in England

MSB Woolton
- Full name: MSB Woolton Football Club
- Founded: 1994
- Ground: Simpsons Football Ground
- League: North West Counties League Division One North
- 2025–26: North West Counties League Division One North, 3rd of 18

MSB Woolton F.C. is a football club based in Woolton, Liverpool, England. They are currently members of the North West Counties League Division One North. They describe themselves as the largest grassroots football club in the UK, with over 200 teams across men's and women's junior and senior football.

== History ==
Founded in 1994, MSB Woolton trace their heritage back to the Woolton Boys Club youth team that formed in the 1930s. They operated under the name Woolton Youth Centre FC and consisted of various loosely connected teams, before a restructuring in the early 2000s brought the club into a tighter organisation, under the name MSB Woolton. They were awarded Charter Standard Community Club status by the FA in 2010, and developed the goal of taking the men's senior team to the North West Counties league to provide a pathway for their youth players.

The senior team joined the Liverpool County Premier Second Division in 2014–15 simply as 'Woolton', taking the name MSB Woolton in 2016 having won successive promotions to reach the Premier Division. Attempts at further promotion were denied by the interruption of football during COVID-19 and then ground-grading issues. In 2025 they were promoted to the North-West Counties League after winning the Liverpool County Division for a second time.

== Ground ==
MSB Woolton's senior men's team play at Jericho Lane.

== Honours ==
- Liverpool County Premier Premier Division
  - Winners 2022–23, 2024–25

== Records ==
- FA Vase
  - Third round 2026-27
