= Staffordshire County Senior League =

Association football league in England

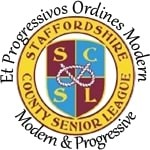
- Founded: 2005
- Divisions: Premier Division; Division One East; Division One West; Division Two North; Division Two South
- No. of teams: 60
- Feeder to: North West Counties League Division One; Midland Football League Division One (not automatic)
- Level on pyramid: Level 11 (Premier Division)
- Website: Official website

The Staffordshire County Senior League is a football competition based in Staffordshire, England. It was formed in 2005 as a merger of the Midland League (formerly known as the Staffordshire Senior League) and the Staffordshire County League.

The former Midland League clubs formed the new Premier Division which sits at step 7 of non-league football (or level 11 of the English football league system), a feeder league to the National League System. The former Staffordshire County League sides formed Division One and Division Two, which are at levels 12 and 13 of English football. Division Two has at times been regionalised, which is currently the case.

In 2024-25 the league operates five divisions across three tiers, the Premier Division (step 7), Division One East and Division One West (step 8), Division Two North and Division Two South (both step 9).

Tunstall Town received national and even international attention in the 2010–11 season, after losing all of their games, and conceding an average of close to ten goals a game; however the team's first eleven did consist of players as old as 75. On 22 February 2014, they ended a 171-game winless run with a 3–2 victory over Betley Reserves.

== Past winners ==
=== Premier Division ===
Season	Winner	Runner-up	Promoted
2005–06	Hanley Town	Ball Haye Green	
2006–07	Wolstanton United	Hanley Town	
2007–08	Wolstanton United	Newcastle Town Reserves	
2008–09	Foley	Wolstanton United	
2009–10	Stretton Eagles	Kidsgrove Athletic Reserves	
2010–11	Ball Haye Green	Hanley Town	
2011–12	Hanley Town	Redgate Clayton	
2012–13	Hanley Town	Redgate Clayton	Hanley Town
2013–14	Wolstanton United	Uttoxeter Town	
2014–15	Wolstanton United	Redgate Clayton	
2015–16	Leek CSOB	Wolstanton United	
2016–17	Abbey Hulton United	Wolstanton United	Abbey Hulton United
2017–18	Wolstanton United	Foley Meir	
2018–19	Silverdale Athletic	Leek County School Old Boys	
2019-20	COVID-19 pandemic		
2020–21	Foley Meir	AFC Alsager	Foley Meir
2021–22	AFC Alsager	Brereton Social	
2022–23	Wolstanton United	Redgate Clayton	
2023–24	Redgate Clayton	AFC Alsager	Foley Meir
2024-25	Ball Haye Green	Brereton Social	
2025–26	Brereton Social	Ball Haye Green	Brereton Social

=== Division One ===
Season	Winner	Runner-up
2005–06	Stafford Rangers Stripes	Congleton Vale
2006–07	Congleton Vale	Barlaston
2007–08	Stretton Eagles	Sandbach United
2008–09	Manor Inne	Holt JCB
2009–10	Barton United	Stone Dominoes Reserves
2010–11	Audley	Barton United
2011–12	Hanley Town Reserves	Cheadle Town
2012–13	Uttoxeter Town	Hilton Harriers
2013–14	Manchester Metropolitan University	Stapenhill Reserves
2014–15	Leek County School Old Boys	Cheadle South Moorlands United
2015–16	Redgate Clayton Reserves	Ashbourne
2016–17	Foley Meir	Stone Dominoes
2017–18	Ossama Blurton	Brereton Social
2018–19	Audley	Abbey Hulton United Reserves
2019-20	COVID-19 pandemic	
2020–21	Shenstone Pathfinder	City of Stoke
2021-22	Milton United FC	Wolstanton United Reserves
2022-23	Kidsgrove Athletic Reserves	Madeley White Star
2023-24	AFC Crewe	Leek Town Development
2024–	Regionalised	

=== Division One (Regions) ===
Season	Division One North		Division One South & Central	
Season	Winner	Runner-up	Winner	Runner-up
2024–25	FC Hanley	AFC Norton	Cannock Dynamos	Cresswell Wanderers

Season	Division One West		Division One East	
Season	Winner	Runner-up	Winner	Runner-up
2025–26	Eccleshall Reserves	Keele University	Warstones Wanderers	Cresswell Wanderers

=== Division Two ===
Season	Winner	Runner-up
2008–09	Talbot Athletic	Wolstanton United Reserves
2009–10	Stretton Eagles Reserves	Audley
2010–11	MMU Cheshire	Lea Hall
2011–12	Audley Reserves	Vodafone Stoke
2012–13	Silverdale Athletic	Hall Heath
2013–14	Featherstone Prison	Uttoxeter Town Reserves
2014–17	Regionalised	
2017–18	Whittington	Goldenhill Wanderers
2018–19	AFC Alsager	AFC Hawkins Sports
2019–20	COVID-19 pandemic	
2020–21	Foley Meir Reserves	FC 41
2021–22	Pelsall Villa Colts	Uttoxeter Town
2022–	Regionalised	

=== Division Two (North and South) ===
Season	Division Two North		Division Two South		Division Two Play-off winner
Season	Winner	Runner-up	Winner	Runner-up	Division Two Play-off winner
2014–15	Market Drayton Tigers	Longton Area	Whittington FC	Wolverhampton SC U21	Whittington FC
2015–16	Eastwood Hanley	Audley Reserves	Penkridge	Shenstone Pathfinder Reserves	Eastwood Hanley
2016–17	Tunstall Town	Foley Meir Reserves	Pathfinder FC	Brereton Social	N/A
2017–22	Not regionalised				
2022-23	Florence Reserves	Stone Old Alleynians A	Brereton Social Reserves	Warstones Wanderers	N/A
2023-24	FC Hanley Reserves	Milton United Reserves	Cannock Dynamos	Newhall United	N/A
2024-25	Eastwood Hanley Reserves	Leek CSOB Reserves	Cannock Dynamos Reserves	Ashbourne Reserves	N/A
2025-26	City of Stoke	FC Hanley Reserves	Willington	Pelsall Villa Colts Development	N/A

== Member clubs (2026–27 season) ==
=== Premier Division ===
- AFC Alsager
- AFC Crewe
- AFC Norton
- Ashbourne
- Audley & District
- Ball Haye Green
- Cannock Town
- Cresswell Wanderers
- Eccleshall
- FC Hanley
- Leek C.S.O.B.
- Leek Town Reserves
- Madeley White Star
- Milton United
- Newcastle Town
- Redgate Clayton
- Rocester
- Silverdale Athletic
- Stafford Town
- Wolstanton United

=== Division One ===
- AFC Alsager Reserves
- Ashbourne Reserves
- Audley & District Reserves
- City of Stoke
- Dove Holes
- FC41
- Foley Meir Reserves
- Hanley Town
- Keele University
- Market Drayton Town
- Newhall United
- Redgate Clayton Reserves
- Stapenhill
- Stone Old Alleynians
- Willington

=== Division Two North ===
- Albrighton
- Ball Haye Green Reserves
- Cheadle Town (Staffs)
- Congleton Vale
- Eastwood Hanley
- FC Hanley Reserves
- Florence Colliery
- Leek C.S.O.B. Reserves
- Ruskin Park
- Silverdale Athletic Development
- Staffordshire Victoria
- Willaston White Star

=== Division Two South ===
- A.F.C. Bradley
- Audrey & District Development
- Hawkins Sports
- Hednesford Forest
- ISSA
- Keele University 2nd
- Lea Hall
- Longton Area Potters
- Pelsall Villa Colts
- Total Football C.F.
- Warstones Wanderers
- Wednesbury Town
- Whittington

=== Division Three ===
- Audley Development
- City of Stoke Development
- Congleton Vale Reds
- FC Hanley Development
- Hanley Town Development
- Madeley White Star Reserves
- Milton Utd Development
- Willaston White Star Reserves
- Wheelock Albion
