= Stockport Georgians A.F.C. =

Association football club in Greater Manchester, England

Coordinates: 53°22′53″N 2°8′55″W

Stockport Georgians
- Full name: Stockport Georgians Association Football Club
- Founded: 1908; 118 years ago
- Ground: Cromley Road, Stockport
- Manager: Andy Jenkins
- League: Midland League Premier Division
- 2025–26: North West Counties League Division One South, 4th of 18 (promoted via play-offs)
Home colours

Stockport Georgians Association Football Club is a football club based in Stockport, Greater Manchester, England. They are currently members of the Midland League Premier Division and play at Cromley Road, Stockport.

== History ==
Stockport Georgians were founded in 1908, competing in the Stockport Sunday League. In 1923, the club was renamed St. George's, after the church of the same name in the Heaviley area of Stockport, joining the Stockport League in the same decade, winning the league in 1926 and 1927. In 1931, Stockport Georgians joined the Lancashire & Cheshire Amateur League. In 1987, the club absorbed Adswood Amateurs, taking their place in the Manchester League, winning the title in their first season in the league. In 2002, the club won the Manchester League for the second time, adding a third title in 2015.

In 2022, the club was admitted into the North West Counties League Division One South.

In 2026, the club managed to obtain promotion to step 5 of the English non league system for the first time, defeating Eccleshall in the playoff final to obtain promotion to the Midlands League for the 2026/27 season.

== Ground ==
Stockport Georgians originally played at Nangreave Road, Heaviley. In 1925, the club moved to their current site in Cromley Road. Between 1970 and 1973, due to the state of the playing surface at Cromley Road, Stockport Georgians played at Woodbank Park and Davenport School.

== Honours ==
- Manchester Football League Premier Division
  - Champions 1987–88, 2001–02, 2014–15

=== As Adswood Amateurs ===
- Manchester Football League Premier Division
  - Champions 1986–87
- Manchester Football League Division One
  - Champions 1985–86

== Records ==
- FA Cup best performance: Extra preliminary round, 2026–27
- FA Vase best performance: Second round, 2024–25
