= Foley Meir F.C. =

Coordinates: 52°59′3.87″N 2°6′13.81″W

Foley Meir
- Full name: Foley Meir Football Club
- Founded: 1947; 79 years ago
- Ground: Trentham Foods Stadium, Whitcombe Road, Stoke-on-Trent
- Chairman: Andy Mapperson
- Manager: Mark Lawton
- League: North West Counties League Division One South
- 2025–26: North West Counties League Division One South, 11th of 18
Home colours

Foley Meir Football Club is based in Stoke-on-Trent, England. They are currently members of the North West Counties League Division One South and play at The Trentham Foods Stadium, Whitcombe Road, Stoke-on-Trent.

== History ==
Founded as Foley in 1947 by ex-servicemen, the club initially joined the Longton League Division Two. In 1996, the club joined the Midland League Division Two, winning the league at the first attempt. In 2005, following the Midland League's merger with the Staffordshire County League, the club became founder members of the Staffordshire County Senior League. In 2022, the club was admitted into the North West Counties League Division One South.

== Ground ==
The club's first ground was The Open Holes in Fenton. In 1982, the club moved to their current ground, The Trentham Foods Stadium, which is located at the end of Whitcombe Road, Stoke-on-Trent ST3 6AU .

== Records ==
- Best FA Vase performance: First round, 2024–25, 2026–27
