= Euxton Villa F.C. =

Coordinates: 53°40′32.74″N 2°41′41.78″W

Euxton Villa
- Full name: Euxton Villa Football Club
- Founded: 1907; 119 years ago
- Ground: Jim Fowler Memorial Ground, Euxton
- Chairman: Graham Keyte
- Manager: Matt Atherton
- League: North West Counties League Premier Division
- 2024–25: North West Counties League Division One North, 5th of 18 (promoted via play-offs)
Home colours

Euxton Villa Football Club is a football club based in Euxton, England. They are currently members of the North West Counties League Premier Division and play at the Jim Fowler Memorial Ground, Euxton.

== History ==
Formed in 1907, as Euxton, the club joined the West Lancashire League. In 1963, the club renamed to Euxton Villa. In 2022, the club was admitted into the North West Counties League Division One North.

== Ground ==
The club currently play at Jim Fowler Memorial Ground, Euxton, named after the founder of the present day Euxton Villa.

== Records ==
- Best FA Cup performance: Extra preliminary round, 2025–26
- Best FA Vase performance: First round, 2024–25
- Record attendance: 618 vs Darwen, North West Counties League Division One North, 3 March 2024
