= Sandbach United F.C. =

Association football club in England

Coordinates: 53.1383°N 2.3872°W

Sandbach United
- Nickname: The Ramblers
- Founded: 2004
- Ground: Sandbach Community Football Centre, Sandbach
- Chairman: Simon Tillott
- Manager: Declan Swan
- League: North West Counties League Division One South
- 2025–26: North West Counties League Division One South, 6th of 18
Home colours	Away colours

Sandbach United Football Club is an English football club based in Sandbach, Cheshire. They play in the North West Counties League Division One South, at level 10 of the English football league system. The club is a FA Charter Standard Club affiliated to the Cheshire Football Association.

The 2023–24 season saw the team have a relatively poor start in a very busy August and it was catch up all the way from that month onwards after Brocton set the early standard. It was to prove a task too far as Brocton were promoted as champions and Sandbach once again equalled their best ever finish with 3rd place for the second season running, but it was the play-offs again and a home tie in the semi final against a strong Abbey Hey side. It was not to be though as Abbey Hey put the tie to bed early with 3 goals in the first half leaving the Ramblers an impossible task. A bright start to the second half saw Sandbach miss an early opportunity to get back in the game and it was thanks to Harry Cain that Sandbach got a goal back making it an exciting finish but ultimately a 1–3 loss to the eventual play off winners.

Another slow start to the 2024-25 campaign again saw Sandbach United fall behind runaway leaders Winsford Utd and Stafford Town but an excellent run of 16 games without defeat once again confirmed a play off spot with 3 games to spare. It was also a good season in the cups with the team making the second round proper of the FA Vase and Cheshire Senior Cup Quarter Finals (the highest ever Cheshire Cup run), a run that included a 3-2 over National League North team Chester FC.

Play off's for the third successive season and once again it wasn't to be as The Ramblers lost 5-4 in an entertaining Semi Final versus Stafford Town.

== Ground ==
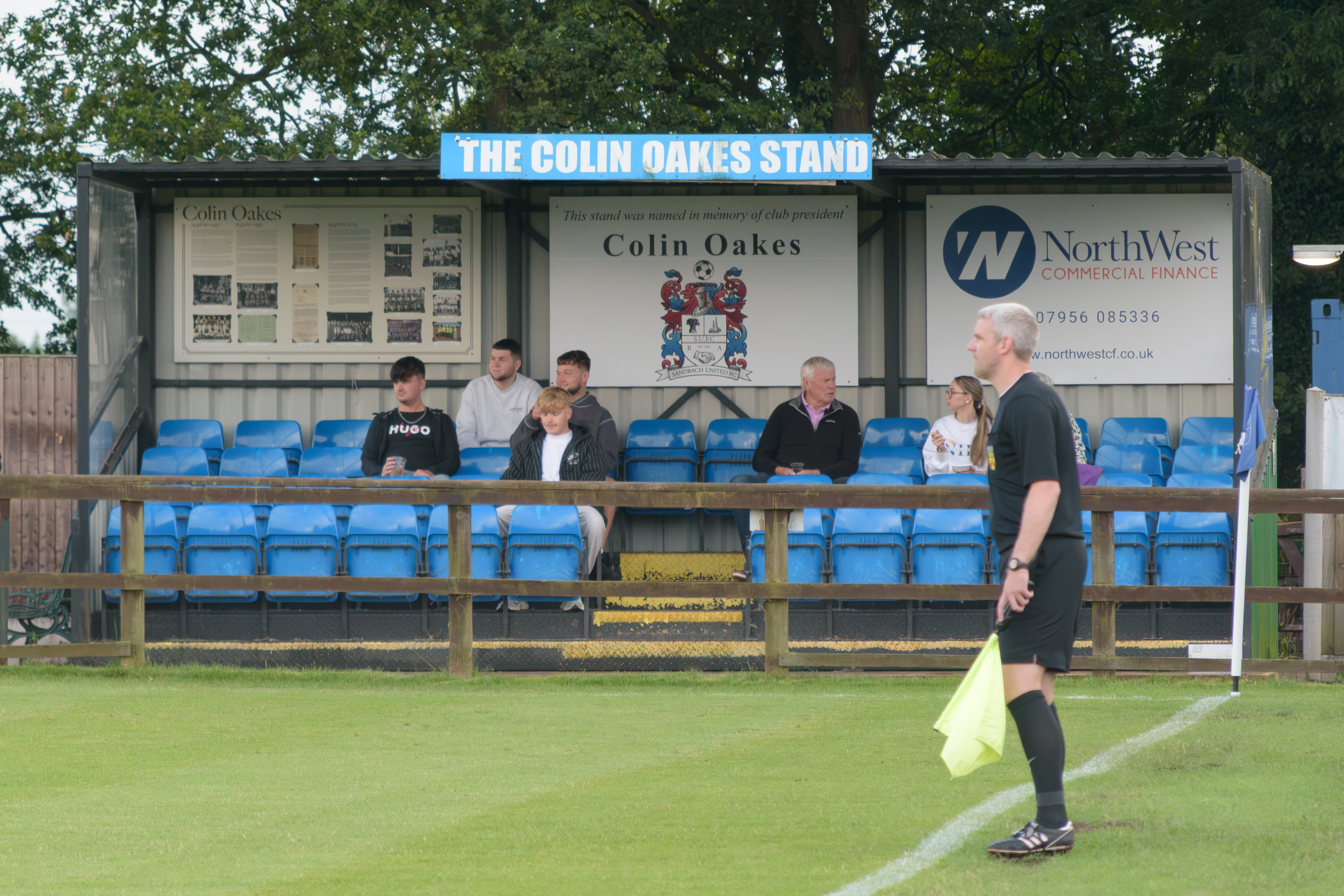
Colin Oakes Stand

The club play their home games at the Sandbach Community Football Centre. The ground is equipped with six floodlights. On promotion to the league a 50-seat covered prefabricated seated stand was erected in memory of Colin Oakes the former club president. A standing area was also erected. with two small covered standing areas nicknamed the "Shed End", the club has an indoor and outside licensed bar area with hospitality suite known as "The Crossbar". in 2020 an electronic scoreboard was added to the ground, the dugouts replaced and moved to the opposite side of the pitch to facilitate the placement of the second 50-seater stand (The Andrew Kimber Stand) which was opened for the 2022/23 season.

== Honours ==
- North West Counties League
  - Division One Challenge Cup winners 2018–19, 2019–20
- Crewe and District Cup
  - Winners 2015–16
