= Ashville F.C. =

Football club in Wallasey, Merseyside, England

Coordinates: 53°25′9.57″N 3°4′17.24″W

Ashville
- Full name: Ashville Football Club
- Nickname: The Villa
- Founded: 1949; 77 years ago
- Ground: Villa Park (Ray Parker Stadium), Wallasey
- Manager: Vacant
- League: North West Counties League Division One North
- 2025–26: North West Counties League Division One South, 7th of 18 (transferred)
Home colours

Ashville Football Club is a football club based in Wallasey, England. They are currently members of the North West Counties League Division One North and play at Villa Park, Wallasey. In 2022 the clubs home ground, Villa Park, was renamed The Ray Parker Stadium after the club sold the naming rights to the ground.

== History ==
Founded in 1949 by D-Day veteran John Dennett, Ashville initially entered the Wallasey Youth League, joining the Bebington League in 1951. After winning the Bebington League, Ashville joined the Wirral Combination, winning the league all three seasons they competed in it. In 1955, Ashville entered the West Cheshire League, winning Division Two at the first attempt. In the 1990–91 season, Ashville entered the FA Vase for the first time. In 2005–06, Ashville reached the fourth round of the competition, before losing 1–0 away at Buxton. In 2022, the club was admitted into the North West Counties League Division One South.

== Ground ==
In 1962, Ashville moved into their current ground at Villa Park, Wallasey. The club sold the naming rights to Villa Park ahead of the 2022/2023 season, the naming rights were sold to local businessman and supporter of the club, Ray Parker. Subsequently, Villa Park was renamed The Ray Parker Stadium.

== Records ==
- Best FA Vase performance: Fourth round, 2005–06
