= Thornton Cleveleys F.C. =

Association football club in England

Coordinates: 53°53′11.89″N 3°0′31.08″W

Thornton Cleveleys
- Full name: Thornton Cleveleys Football Club
- Founded: 1987 (39 years ago)
- Ground: Fox Group Sports Arena Thornton-Cleveleys
- Chairman: Steve Abbott
- Manager: Paul Gregory
- League: North West Counties League Division One North
- 2025–26: North West Counties League Division One North, 7th of 18
Home colours

Thornton Cleveleys Football Club is a football club based in Thornton-Cleveleys, Lancashire, England. They are members of the North West Counties League Division One North and play at the Fox Group Sports Arena on Gamble Road in Thornton-Cleveleys.

== History ==
Founded as a works team in 1987, under the name of ICI Thornton, for the workers at chlorine-production plant ICI Hillhouse, the club changed its name to Thornton Cleveleys International in 1992, following the closure of ICI Hillhouse. In 1995, changed to their current guise of Thornton Cleveleys, remaining in the West Lancashire League. In 2010, the club was promoted to the Premier Division. In 2022, Thornton Cleveleys won the West Lancashire League, winning a second title two years later. In 2024, the club was admitted into the North West Counties League Division One North.

== Ground ==
In 2021, the club left Bourne Park, their home of more than 20 years, to move to a new £1 million complex on nearby Gamble Road, in the Burn Naze area of Thornton-Cleveleys, adjacent to Fleetwood Town's Poolfoot Farm training ground.

In October 2026, the club announced that Fox Group had acquired the naming rights for the ground and in turn the ground would be now formally named as the Fox Group Sports Arena.

== Records ==
- Best FA Vase performance: Third Round 2026-27
