= 2015–16 North West Counties Football League =

The 2015–16 North West Counties Football League season was the 34th in the history of the North West Counties Football League, a football competition in England.

The league comprised two divisions, the Premier Division and the First Division (at levels 9 and 10 of the English football league system, Steps 5 and 6 of the National League System respectively). Additionally there were two cup competitions: the League Challenge Cup (known as the Men United Cup for sponsorship reasons) knockout competition open to all the league's clubs; and the First Division Trophy (known as the Reusch First Division Cup for sponsorship reasons), a knockout trophy competition for First Division clubs only.

== Premier Division ==
North West Counties Football League Premier Division
- Season: 2015–16
- Teams: 22
- Champions: Colne
- Promoted: Colne
- Relegated: Alsager Town; Silsden; AFC Blackpool
- Matches: 462
- Goals: 1,687 (3.65 per match)
- Average attendance: 142

The constitution of the Premier Division was advised to member clubs on 27 May 2015; it featured 22 clubs, 18 remaining from the previous season plus four additions:

Three promoted from the First Division

- Atherton Collieries, promoted as champions
- Cammell Laird 1907, promoted as runners-up
- AFC Darwen, promoted as promotion play-off winners

and, additionally

- Padiham, relegated from Northern Premier League Division One North

As in the previous four seasons clubs wishing to be promoted from the Premier Division had to meet the National League System promotion criteria. Five clubs applied for promotion: 1874 Northwich; Atherton Collieries; Colne; Runcorn Linnets; Runcorn Town.

At the end of the season the champions Colne were promoted to the Northern Premier League Division One North. The clubs finishing in the bottom three places in the table, Alsager Town, Silsden and A.F.C. Blackpool, were relegated to the First Division. Over the season the average goals scored per divisional match increased to a new high for the Premier Division (formerly Division One) of 3.65 goals per match (an increase over the 3.52 during the 2010–11 season).

=== League table ===
Pos	Team	Pld	W	D	L	GF	GA	GD	Pts	Season End Notes
1	Colne (C, P)	42	31	7	4	105	41	+64	100	Promoted to Northern Premier; League Division One North
2	Runcorn Linnets	42	32	2	8	97	35	+62	98	
3	Atherton Collieries	42	25	9	8	113	66	+47	84	
4	1874 Northwich	42	24	6	12	89	62	+27	78	
5	West Didsbury & Chorlton	42	21	5	16	81	65	+16	68	
6	Congleton Town	42	19	10	13	79	65	+14	67	
7	Ashton Athletic	42	17	10	15	73	68	+5	61	
8	Bootle	42	17	10	15	75	75	0	61	
9	Barnoldswick Town	42	17	8	17	77	69	+8	59	
10	Abbey Hey	42	16	11	15	67	66	+1	59	
11	Padiham	42	16	9	17	84	90	−6	57	
12	Maine Road	42	16	7	19	72	76	−4	55	
13	Runcorn Town	42	15	7	20	70	76	−6	52	
14	Winsford United	42	14	10	18	66	93	−27	52	
15	Cammell Laird 1907	42	14	8	20	71	83	−12	50	
16	Nelson	42	13	9	20	69	70	−1	48	
17	AFC Liverpool	42	11	15	16	86	92	−6	48	
18	AFC Darwen	42	12	7	23	82	111	−29	43	
19	Squires Gate	42	11	8	23	53	91	−38	41	
20	Alsager Town (R)	42	11	6	25	56	101	−45	39	Relegated to First Division
21	Silsden (R)	42	9	11	22	57	88	−31	38	Relegated to First Division
22	AFC Blackpool (R)	42	9	9	24	65	104	−39	36	Relegated to First Division

Source: "Final Tables, Season 2015/16". nwcfl.com., "North West Counties League - North West Counties League Premier Division: 2015 – 16: League Table". nonleaguematters.co.uk.
Rules for classification: 1) points; 2) goal difference; 3) number of goals scored.
(C) Champions; (P) Promoted; (R) Relegated

=== Results ===
Home \ Away	18N	ABH	ABL	ADR	ALV	ALS	ASH	ACO	BWT	BTL	CAM	CLN	CON	MNR	NEL	PAD	RNL	RNT	SIL	SQG	WDC	WNS
1874 Northwich		2–1	3–0	2–3	1–0	1–1	3–1	1–3	2–1	3–3	2–0	0–1	1–0	1–2	4–2	5–4	0–1	2–1	2–1	2–0	1–0	2–2
Abbey Hey	0–1		1–1	2–1	2–3	3–1	0–2	2–1	0–2	4–1	4–2	1–3	4–1	3–0	3–0	3–0	0–4	2–0	1–3	3–1	1–5	2–4
AFC Blackpool	3–4	1–3		2–3	1–5	0–1	2–3	1–3	0–3	1–1	1–2	0–4	5–2	2–0	1–0	2–2	0–2	1–2	5–0	3–1	3–5	2–2
AFC Darwen	3–1	2–2	2–2		3–3	3–0	2–3	3–7	3–1	0–1	4–1	0–4	1–3	7–4	1–3	1–2	0–2	1–5	2–2	1–1	2–2	1–2
AFC Liverpool	3–3	1–1	7–1	6–1		4–0	1–4	0–0	3–6	2–1	2–2	1–1	0–1	2–2	1–1	2–2	2–1	1–4	2–3	1–0	2–6	4–2
Alsager Town	0–5	2–0	1–2	1–4	2–2		3–3	3–2	3–2	1–0	1–0	1–2	1–4	0–1	2–4	0–2	3–1	0–1	1–2	3–3	1–2	3–4
Ashton Athletic	4–0	1–2	0–1	1–0	4–2	1–1		2–0	4–2	2–3	2–1	1–3	1–4	0–2	2–1	2–4	0–3	1–1	2–2	0–2	3–0	2–2
Atherton Colls	1–3	0–0	2–2	6–1	5–1	4–2	1–0		1–1	0–1	3–1	3–0	2–1	4–3	3–3	2–4	0–2	4–0	7–2	5–2	2–0	4–1
Barnoldswick T	2–1	0–0	4–1	5–1	1–1	1–4	2–2	5–1		1–1	2–2	1–2	1–1	4–2	3–1	2–1	1–2	1–4	0–0	3–0	0–3	5–2
Bootle	2–3	2–2	6–0	3–2	3–3	4–1	3–2	2–5	0–2		3–2	3–2	1–0	2–1	1–2	1–3	1–0	0–1	4–0	5–1	1–2	2–2
Cammell L 1907	0–1	2–3	2–1	4–2	4–4	3–1	2–2	3–4	2–0	3–1		4–0	1–3	1–1	3–0	0–3	0–3	2–2	2–0	2–0	0–1	1–4
Colne	1–1	1–1	2–1	6–1	4–1	5–0	6–2	1–1	4–0	1–0	3–0		4–2	2–0	2–1	0–0	2–0	2–2	2–1	0–0	3–0	6–2
Congleton Town	4–4	1–1	3–3	2–0	0–0	3–0	0–2	1–2	4–3	3–0	2–1	0–2		2–0	1–0	4–2	2–0	4–1	1–0	1–1	2–2	1–0
Maine Road	4–2	2–0	0–2	5–3	4–3	2–2	0–1	2–2	2–0	2–2	2–4	1–3	0–0		2–1	0–3	0–2	3–2	3–1	3–1	0–1	5–0
Nelson	0–2	2–3	3–1	0–0	1–2	3–0	0–0	3–4	1–0	2–2	3–1	0–1	0–1	1–1		4–0	1–1	3–2	2–1	1–3	4–2	5–1
Padiham	0–7	2–1	3–3	0–2	1–1	6–3	2–1	1–1	0–2	1–1	2–1	1–3	4–3	3–1	4–4		0–4	1–1	5–1	0–1	1–3	5–1
Runcorn Linnets	2–1	3–0	5–1	3–1	2–1	4–0	0–1	1–4	0–1	7–1	4–0	4–0	2–1	2–1	1–0	3–1		2–1	2–1	2–0	0–0	5–1
Runcorn Town	0–2	0–2	4–2	2–5	5–2	0–1	1–4	0–4	3–2	1–2	0–1	1–2	4–2	1–0	0–4	2–0	1–3		2–2	5–0	0–0	1–0
Silsden	2–1	2–2	3–0	0–2	2–0	0–1	2–2	0–3	3–1	1–1	1–2	1–3	2–2	2–3	1–0	3–2	1–3	2–2		1–2	1–1	2–3
Squires Gate	2–1	0–0	0–1	6–3	3–1	1–2	0–0	3–4	2–1	0–3	2–2	1–4	1–2	0–5	2–2	3–2	2–3	2–1	3–1		0–4	1–3
W Didsbury & C	2–3	3–1	2–1	4–2	0–3	4–3	0–3	1–2	0–1	4–0	2–3	1–3	4–3	0–1	3–0	5–1	0–3	0–3	2–1	3–0		2–0
Winsford United	0–3	1–1	3–3	0–3	2–1	2–0	2–0	1–1	0–1	0–1	2–2	0–5	2–2	2–0	2–0	1–4	2–3	2–1	1–1	2–0	1–0	

Source: "Premier Division Results 2015/16". nwcfl.com.
Legend: Blue = home team win; Yellow = draw; Red = away team win.

=== Stadia and Locations ===
Sources for this subsection: NWCFL web site and the websites of the participating clubs

Locations of the 2015–16 North West Counties Football League Premier Division teams

Team	Stadium	Capacity
AFC Darwen	The Anchor Ground	4,000
A.F.C. Liverpool	Marine Travel Arena, Crosby (groundshare with Marine)	3,185
1874 Northwich	Barton Stadium (groundshare with Winsford United)	3,000
Winsford United	Barton Stadium	3,000
Atherton Collieries	Alder Street	2,500
Bootle	Delta Taxis Stadium	2,500
Silsden	The Asda Foundation Stadium	2,300
Cammell Laird 1907	North West Construction Stadium, Birkenhead	2,000
Maine Road	Brantingham Road, Chorlton	2,000
Nelson	Little Wembley	2,000
Colne	XLCR Stadium	1,800
Padiham	Arbories Memorial Sports Ground	1,688
Runcorn Linnets	Millbank Linnets Stadium	1,600
Runcorn Town	Pavilions Sports Complex	1,530
A.F.C. Blackpool	The Mechanics	1,500
Alsager Town	Wood Park Stadium	1,500
Congleton Town	Richborough Estates Stadium	1,450
Abbey Hey	The Abbey Stadium, Gorton	1,000
Ashton Athletic	Brockstedes Park	1,000
Squires Gate	School Road	1,000
Barnoldswick Town	Silentnight Beds Stadium	
West Didsbury & Chorlton	Brookburn Road, Chorlton	

== First Division ==
North West Counties Football League First Division
- Season: 2015–16
- Teams: 18
- Champions: Hanley Town
- Promoted: Hanley Town; Irlam; Barnton
- Relegated: Rochdale Town
- Matches: 306
- Goals: 1,146 (3.75 per match)
- Average attendance: 56

A provisional constitution of the First Division was advised to member clubs on 27 May 2015; this included Oldham Boro and Wigan Robin Park (who subsequently resigned), and newly allocated club Stockport Town – but not Whitchurch Alport whose initial application was refused but who were successful after appealing the decision. The First Division featured 18 clubs, 14 remaining from the previous season plus four additions:

- Bacup Borough, relegated from Premier Division, who reverted from Bacup & Rossendale Borough to their former name
- St Helens Town, relegated from Premier Division
- Stockport Town a recently formed club allocated to the division by the FA Leagues Committee
- Whitchurch Alport, joined from Mercian Regional Football League Premier Division

Northwich Flixton Villa changed their name to Northwich Manchester Villa

At the end of the season the champions Hanley Town, runners-up Irlam and promotion play-off winners Barnton (who had finished third in the table) were promoted to the Premier Division. Also leaving the division were Rochdale Town who were relegated over ground grading considerations to the Manchester League but folded shortly after the start of the following season and Northwich Manchester Villa who resigned shortly after the end of the season.

=== League table ===
Pos	Team	Pld	W	D	L	GF	GA	GD	Pts	Season End Notes
1	Hanley Town (C, P)	34	25	3	6	68	32	+36	78	Promoted to Premier Division
2	Irlam (P)	34	24	5	5	73	27	+46	77	Promoted to Premier Division
3	Barnton (O, P)	34	19	9	6	94	36	+58	66	Won the promotion play-offs, promoted to Premier Division (Note: Winner from the four clubs who competed in the promotion play-offs)
4	Stockport Town	34	19	6	9	68	44	+24	63	Qualified for promotion play-offs
5	Bacup Borough	34	17	6	11	81	54	+27	57	Qualified for promotion play-offs
6	Cheadle Town	34	16	8	10	89	59	+30	56	Qualified for promotion play-offs
7	St Helens Town	34	17	4	13	84	61	+23	55	
8	Holker Old Boys	34	16	7	11	73	62	+11	55	
9	Litherland REMYCA	34	16	6	12	63	51	+12	54	
10	Rochdale Town (R)	34	14	5	15	66	77	−11	47	Relegated (ground grading)
11	Ashton Town	34	12	7	15	57	57	0	43	
12	Daisy Hill	34	12	6	16	56	72	−16	42	
13	Widnes	34	10	5	19	67	77	−10	35	
14	Chadderton	34	9	8	17	43	53	−10	35	
15	Northwich Manchester Villa	34	10	4	20	48	77	−29	34	Resigned (after the season)
16	Eccleshall	34	9	5	20	53	77	−24	32	
17	Atherton Laburnum Rovers	34	4	6	24	32	103	−71	18	
18	Whitchurch Alport	34	2	10	22	31	127	−96	16	

Source: "Final Tables, Season 2015/16". nwcfl.com., "North West Counties League - North West Counties League Division One North: 2015 – 16: League Table". nonleaguematters.co.uk.
Rules for classification: 1) points; 2) goal difference; 3) number of goals scored.
(C) Champions; (O) Play-off winners; (P) Promoted; (R) Relegated

=== Results ===
Home \ Away	AST	ALR	BAC	BAR	CHA	CHT	DSH	ECC	HAN	HOB	IRL	LIT	NMV	RCH	STH	SPT	WHI	WID
Ashton Town		0–0	1–2	2–3	4–0	3–2	0–0	4–3	0–1	2–2	0–1	1–4	5–1	3–2	4–4	0–1	5–0	1–2
Atherton Lab. R	1–1		0–4	0–6	3–1	1–4	0–3	1–1	1–3	3–2	1–1	0–2	0–3	2–1	1–4	0–0	0–1	2–3
Bacup Borough	2–0	2–3		1–1	0–1	5–5	2–2	3–1	2–1	4–1	0–1	2–1	4–2	9–2	3–3	1–1	7–0	6–0
Barnton	3–0	3–0	2–0		2–0	1–2	0–0	1–1	0–1	4–1	1–0	1–2	2–1	7–1	2–3	4–1	11–1	0–1
Chadderton	6–0	6–0	0–0	0–0		0–1	5–1	3–0	0–1	1–1	1–1	1–1	1–4	2–1	1–3	0–1	2–0	4–3
Cheadle Town	1–2	10–1	3–0	2–2	1–1		4–0	4–2	1–2	2–2	1–2	2–4	1–1	0–3	1–2	0–1	5–3	2–0
Daisy Hill	0–4	4–2	3–0	1–6	3–0	0–1		0–3	1–3	0–3	0–4	1–3	2–3	2–4	1–2	2–1	4–3	4–2
Eccleshall	2–2	3–2	0–1	1–1	1–1	3–6	1–3		1–2	1–2	0–3	2–1	1–2	1–2	0–3	4–3	3–1	0–5
Hanley Town	2–1	3–0	1–0	1–0	2–0	2–2	2–3	2–0		5–1	0–0	3–2	2–0	3–1	2–1	2–3	0–0	4–3
Holker OB	2–2	2–0	5–2	1–4	2–1	1–3	4–1	3–0	3–1		1–1	1–4	6–0	1–0	0–5	0–0	8–0	3–1
Irlam	3–1	3–0	1–4	1–2	2–0	4–1	0–2	1–0	2–1	3–1		3–1	3–0	4–0	2–0	2–1	5–1	4–1
Litherland R	0–2	6–1	0–1	2–2	2–1	2–1	0–2	0–5	0–2	2–0	1–1		4–1	2–2	3–1	1–2	1–0	1–0
Northwich Mcr. V	0–2	3–0	0–2	3–3	2–0	0–3	2–2	4–3	1–3	1–2	1–3	2–1		0–5	0–1	0–2	1–1	2–3
Rochdale Town	2–0	4–3	0–3	1–6	5–0	2–6	1–1	2–0	1–3	4–3	0–3	2–1	3–0		3–1	0–0	5–1	1–3
St Helens Town	0–1	4–1	4–0	3–3	3–1	2–2	2–6	2–3	0–2	1–3	3–1	2–3	3–0	2–3		0–3	10–0	3–2
Stockport Town	2–1	4–0	3–2	0–2	2–0	3–5	2–0	6–0	1–0	1–2	0–3	2–2	2–1	3–1	3–0		4–1	2–2
Whitchurch Alport	1–0	2–2	1–5	1–6	1–1	1–4	1–1	0–5	0–3	2–2	0–3	1–1	0–4	1–1	0–5	0–7		3–3
Widnes	2–3	4–1	5–2	1–3	0–2	1–1	2–1	1–2	1–3	1–2	1–2	1–3	2–3	1–1	1–2	6–1	3–3	

Source: "First Division Results 2015/16". nwcfl.com.
Legend: Blue = home team win; Yellow = draw; Red = away team win.

=== Promotion play-offs ===
The 2015–16 First Division promotion play-offs between the clubs that finished 3rd to 6th in the league table were won by Barnton who had finished in third position.

Semi-finals
3	Barnton	4 (Note: after extra time, score at 90 minutes: 1–1)
6	Cheadle Town	1
4	Stockport Town	0
5	Bacup Borough	2

Final
3	Barnton	2 (Note: after extra time, score at 90 minutes: 0–0)
5	Bacup Borough	0

Source: NWCFL First Division Play Off Results: 2015/16 Season

==== Semi-finals ====
9 May 2016	Barnton	4–1 (a.e.t.)	Cheadle Town	Barnton
	Towey 78' (pen.), 97', 99'; Rigby 117'	Report	Tongue 35'	Stadium: Townfield; Attendance: 159

9 May 2016	Stockport Town	0–2	Bacup Borough	Woodley
		Report	Bell 11'; Bellamy 36'	Stadium: Stockport Sports Village; Attendance: 188

==== Final ====
14 May 2016	Barnton	2–0 (a.e.t.)	Bacup Borough	Barnton
	McShane 101'; Malone 120'	Report		Stadium: Townfield; Attendance: 554

=== Stadia & Locations ===
Sources for this section: NWCFL web site and the websites of the participating clubs

Locations of the 2015–16 North West Counties Football League First Division teams

Team	Stadium	Capacity
Widnes	Select Security Stadium	13,350
Northwich Manchester Villa	Manchester Regional Arena	6,500
Atherton Laburnum Rovers	Crilly Park	3,000
Bacup Borough	West View	3,000
Holker Old Boys	Rakesmoor Lane Barrow-in-Furness	2,500
Stockport Town	The Neil Rourke Memorial Stadium	2,384
Ashton Town	Edge Green Street	2,000
Cheadle Town	Park Road Stadium	2,000
Daisy Hill	New Sirs Westhoughton	2,000
Chadderton	MCA Stadium	1,500
Rochdale Town	Mayfield Sports Centre	1,500
Eccleshall	Pershall Park	1,000
Irlam	Silver Street	1,000
St Helens Town	Brockstedes Park (groundshare with Ashton Athletic)	1,000
Hanley Town	Abbey Lane	750
Barnton	Townfield	
Litherland REMYCA	Litherland Sports Park	
Whitchurch Alport	Yockings Park	

== League Challenge Cup ==
The 2015–16 League Challenge Cup (known as the Men United Cup for sponsorship reasons) was a knockout competition open to all the league's 40 clubs. The final, played at Fleetwood Town F.C., between Premier Division clubs was won 5–1 by the previous seasons losing finalist Atherton Collieries who defeated Colne thus denying them a league and cup double.

=== First round ===
All the 22 Premier Division clubs together with Bacup Borough and Rochdale Town of the First Division received byes to the second round.

(Appended to club names in the results listings below: '(PD)'=Premier Division club; '(FD)'=First Division club)

Home team (division)	Score	Away team (division)
Atherton Laburnun Rovers (FD)	1–2	Daisy Hill (FD)
Barnton (FD)	2–0	Northwich Manchester Villa (FD)
Cheadle Town (FD)	1–2	Stockport Town (FD)
Eccleshall (FD)	3–3 (a.e.t.) (90min: 3–3) (4–3 p)	Chadderton (FD)
Hanley Town (FD)	4–1	St Helens Town (FD)
Irlam (FD)	2–1	Widnes (FD)
Litherland REMYCA (FD)	3–1	Holker Old Boys (FD)
Whitchurch Alport (FD)	1–5	Ashton Town (FD)

=== Second round ===
Home team (division)	Score	Away team (division)
1874 Northwich (PD)	4–0	Winsford United (PD)
Abbey Hey (PD)	0–1	Silsden (PD)
AFC Darwen (PD)	1–3	AFC Blackpool (PD)
AFC Liverpool (PD)	2–3	Padiham (PD)
Alsager Town (PD)	0–3	Stockport Town (FD)
Ashton Town (FD)	1–2	Runcorn Town (PD)
Atherton Collieries (PD)	2–0	Litherland REMYCA (FD)
Barnoldswick Town (PD)	1–3	
Barnton (FD)	1–1 (a.e.t.) (90min: 1–1) (4–3 p)	Bootle (PD)
Daisy Hill (FD)	0–4	Cammell Laird 1907 (PD)
Hanley Town (FD)	2–4	Bacup Borough (FD)
Irlam (FD)	2–0	Runcorn Linnets (PD)
Maine Road (PD)	1–5	Squires Gate (PD)
Nelson (PD)	4–3 (a.e.t.) (90min: 3–3)	Congleton Town (PD)
Rochdale Town (FD)	1–2	Colne (PD)
West Didsbury & Chorlton (PD)	1–2	Eccleshall (FD)

=== Third round ===
Home team (division)	Score	Away team (division)
1874 Northwich (PD)	2–2 (a.e.t.) (90min: 1–1) (7–8 p) (Note: Match venue moved to Ashton Athletic F.C. following weather related postponements)	Ashton Athletic (PD)
Bacup Borough (FD)	1–5 (Note: Match venue moved to Atherton Collieries F.C. following weather related postponements)	Atherton Collieries (PD)
Eccleshall (FD)	2–0	Irlam (FD)
Nelson (PD)	2–4	Cammell Laird 1907 (PD)
Padiham (PD)	2–2 (a.e.t.) (90min: 1–1) (4–5 p)	Runcorn Town (PD)
Silsden (PD)	0–1	AFC Blackpool (PD)
Squires Gate (PD)	2–5 (a.e.t.) (90min: 2–2)	Colne (PD)
Stockport Town (FD)	1–3	Barnton (FD)

=== Quarter-finals ===
Home team (division)	Score	Away team (division)
Barnton (FD)	3–1	Ashton Athletic (PD)
Cammell Laird 1907 (PD)	0–2	AFC Blackpool (PD)
Colne (PD)	2–0	Eccleshall (FD)
Runcorn Town (PD)	0–3	Atherton Collieries (PD)

=== Semi-finals ===
Home team (division)	Score	Away team (division)
Colne (PD)	2–0	AFC Blackpool (PD)
Atherton Collieries (PD)	1–0	Barnton (FD)

=== Final ===
Team (division)	Score	Team (division)
Played 10 May 2016 at Fleetwood Town F.C., Highbury Stadium
Atherton Collieries (PD)	5–1	Colne (PD)

source: "League Challenge Cup: 2015/2016 Season". nwcfl.com.

== First Division Trophy ==
The 2015–16 First Division Trophy (known as the Reusch First Division Cup for sponsorship reasons) was a knockout competition for the 18 First Division clubs only. The final, held at Congleton Town F.C., was won 5–4 on penalties after a 1–1 draw after extra time (1–1 at 90 minutes) by Barnton who defeated Hanley Town, who were thus denied a First Division league and cup double.

=== First round ===
Four clubs played in the first round, the remaining 14 received a bye to the second round.

Home team	Score	Away team
Barnton	3–2	Eccleshall
Chadderton	2–0	Bacup Borough

=== Second round ===
Home team	Score	Away team
Daisy Hill	1–2	Litherland REMYCA
Hanley Town	2–1	Widnes
Holker Old Boys	2–0	Ashton Town
Irlam	3–2	Cheadle Town
Northwich Manchester Villa	1–4 (Note: Played at Cheadle Town F.C.)	Barnton
Rochdale Town	3–1	Atherton Laburnum Rovers
St Helens Town	3–6 (a.e.t.) (90min: 3–3) (Note: Match venue moved to Chadderton F.C. following weather related postponements)	Chadderton
Whitchurch Alport	0–4	Stockport Town

=== Quarter-finals ===
Home team	Score	Away team
Hanley Town	2–1	Chadderton
Holker Old Boys	1–2 (Note: Match venue moved to Barnton F.C. following weather related postponements)	Barnton
Litherland REMYCA	x–x (Note: Both clubs disqualified for fielding an ineligible player (match result 3–2))	Irlam
Rochdale Town	1–4 (Note: Match venue moved to Stockport Town F.C. following weather related postponements)	Stockport Town

=== Semi-finals ===
Home team	Score	Away team
(disqualified)	W/O	Hanley Town (Note: Hanley Town awarded walkover to final)
Stockport Town	0–0(a.e.t.) (4–5 p)	Barnton

=== Final ===
Team (division)	Score	Team (division)
Played on 19 April at Congleton Town F.C. Richborough Estates Stadium
Barnton	1–1 (a.e.t.) (90min: 1–1) (5–4 p)	Hanley Town

source: "First Division Trophy: 2015/16 Season". nwcfl.com.
