= 2016–17 North West Counties Football League =

The 2016–17 North West Counties Football League season (known as the Hallmark Security League for sponsorship reasons) was the 35th in the history of the North West Counties Football League, a football competition in England.

The league comprised two divisions, the Premier Division and the First Division (at levels 9 and 10 of the English football league system, Steps 5 and 6 of the National League System respectively). Additionally there were two cup competitions: the League Challenge Cup (known as the Macron Challenge Cup for sponsorship reasons), a knockout competition open to all the league's clubs; and the First Division Trophy (known as the Reusch First Division Cup for sponsorship reasons), a knockout trophy competition for First Division clubs only.

== Premier Division ==
North West Counties Football League Premier Division
- Season: 2016–17
- Teams: 22
- Champions: Atherton Collieries
- Promoted: Atherton Collieries
- Relegated: New Mills; Nelson; Cammell Laird 1907
- Matches: 462
- Goals: 1,735 (3.76 per match)
- Average attendance: 142

The 2016–17 Premier Division club allocations from the FA Leagues Committee (subject to appeal) were announced on 12 May 2016 and its constitution presented at the league's AGM on 11 June 2016. The division comprised 22 clubs, 18 remaining from the previous season plus 4 additions:

- Barnton, promoted as First Division promotion play-off winners
- Hanley Town, promoted as champions from the First Division
- Irlam, promoted as runners-up from the First Division
- New Mills, relegated from the Northern Premier League First Division North

Clubs wishing to be promoted from the Premier Division had to meet the National League System promotion criteria: seven clubs applied for promotion prior to the 30 November 2016 deadline: 1874 Northwich, AFC Liverpool, Atherton Collieries, Bootle, Padiham, Runcorn Linnets and Runcorn Town.

At the end of the season the champions Atherton Collieries were promoted to the Northern Premier League Division One North. The clubs finishing in the bottom three places in the table, Cammell Laird 1907, New Mills and Nelson, were relegated to the First Division. Over the season the average goals scored per divisional match increased to a new high for the Premier Division (formerly Division One) of 3.76 goals per match (a slight increase over the 3.65 of the previous season).

=== League table ===
Pos	Team	Pld	W	D	L	GF	GA	GD	Pts	Season End Notes
1	Atherton Collieries (C, P)	42	32	4	6	103	39	+64	100	Promoted to Northern Premier; League Division One North
2	Bootle	42	30	2	10	134	57	+77	92	
3	Runcorn Town	42	29	5	8	112	52	+60	92	
4	Runcorn Linnets	42	27	9	6	105	45	+60	90	
5	1874 Northwich	42	25	7	10	81	50	+31	82	
6	West Didsbury & Chorlton	42	21	7	14	106	83	+23	70	
7	Padiham	42	21	6	15	85	71	+14	69	
8	Irlam	42	19	9	14	65	70	−5	66	
9	Ashton Athletic	42	17	9	16	83	74	+9	60	
10	Hanley Town	42	15	12	15	83	73	+10	57	
11	Barnoldswick Town	42	16	8	18	78	75	+3	56	
12	AFC Liverpool	42	16	9	17	79	84	−5	54 (Note: AFC Liverpool had 3 points deducted for fielding an ineligible player in their match against Barnoldswick Town on 13 August 2016)	
13	Winsford United	42	15	7	20	76	85	−9	52	
14	Abbey Hey	42	15	7	20	63	76	−13	52	
15	Maine Road	42	13	10	19	67	72	−5	49	
16	Congleton Town	42	12	11	19	75	89	−14	47	
17	Barnton	42	13	6	23	50	95	−45	45	
18	AFC Darwen	42	10	11	21	50	110	−60	41	
19	Squires Gate	42	10	10	22	80	106	−26	40	
20	New Mills (R)	42	8	9	25	65	102	−37	33	Relegated to First Division
21	Nelson (R)	42	5	11	26	55	87	−32	25 (Note: Nelson had 1 deducted point for fielding an ineligible player in their match against Atherton Collieries of 10 October 2016)	Relegated to First Division
22	Cammell Laird 1907 (R)	42	3	11	28	40	140	−100	20	Relegated to First Division

Source: "Final Tables, Season 2016/17". nwcfl.com., "North West Counties League - North West Counties League Premier Division: 2016 – 17: League Table". nonleaguematters.co.uk.
Rules for classification: 1) Points; 2) Goal difference; 3) Number of goals scored; 4) Number of matches won; 5) Head-to-head results
(C) Champions; (P) Promoted; (R) Relegated

=== Results ===
Home \ Away	18N	ABH	ADR	ALV	ASH	ATH	BND	BNT	BTL	CAM	CON	HAN	IRL	MNR	NEL	NWM	PAD	RNL	RNT	SQG	WDC	WIN
1874 Northwich		2–0	3–0	1–3	1–0	1–2	2–0	2–1	1–1	5–0	1–3	1–0	1–1	2–0	2–1	2–1	1–2	1–4	3–2	4–1	4–1	0–4
Abbey Hey	1–1		1–1	3–2	1–2	1–2	2–0	3–2	0–1	4–0	0–3	0–2	1–2	3–2	7–0	1–1	0–3	0–1	0–2	3–2	2–2	1–3
AFC Darwen	1–3	1–3		2–2	0–4	1–5	0–7	2–0	1–7	0–0	0–2	1–1	3–2	0–6	0–3	1–1	1–2	0–3	0–3	4–1	3–0	2–2
AFC Liverpool	0–1	1–2	0–2		3–1	1–2	5–2	1–2	1–4	4–1	1–0	2–2	3–2	1–2	1–5	1–1	1–0	3–1	1–4	4–2	3–2	2–0
Ashton Athletic	3–2	0–1	1–3	2–2		0–4	0–4	5–1	0–6	1–1	6–2	3–2	1–3	2–2	6–0	3–0	3–1	0–3	1–1	2–1	2–3	3–0
Atherton Colls	1–0	1–0	5–1	1–2	3–1		3–0	1–0	1–0	4–1	5–0	3–0	1–1	1–0	2–2	2–1	2–1	0–1	1–2	1–1	3–1	2–1
Barnoldswick T	2–1	3–0	1–1	5–2	0–0	1–2		0–2	1–2	2–0	3–3	2–1	3–0	1–1	2–1	4–2	1–2	0–2	7–2	2–4	1–3	2–1
Barnton	1–0	1–1	1–0	2–1	1–0	2–5	1–0		0–3	6–0	0–0	0–6	0–2	1–1	3–3	1–0	1–6	0–4	0–3	0–0	0–3	3–2
Bootle	0–0	2–1	9–0	4–3	3–0	3–2	6–1	4–2		6–1	3–2	2–2	1–2	1–0	3–1	3–2	6–1	1–2	3–0	0–2	3–5	5–1
Cammell L 1907	1–6	0–2	4–1	2–2	0–6	2–6	1–1	0–1	1–7		2–7	1–0	2–5	1–1	0–0	1–1	0–0	3–3	0–4	1–3	2–7	1–4
Congleton Town	2–4	6–1	3–3	2–2	0–1	0–4	1–1	3–4	0–2	1–0		0–0	1–2	3–1	0–3	2–3	2–2	0–0	0–3	3–2	2–1	1–1
Hanley Town	0–1	3–0	3–1	2–2	4–3	1–4	2–3	4–1	1–7	3–0	4–1		1–1	2–2	1–1	2–2	0–3	0–0	1–3	4–2	1–2	2–0
Irlam	0–1	4–3	1–3	3–3	1–2	1–1	1–0	2–1	1–0	0–2	1–1	2–1		1–0	1–1	1–0	1–1	0–4	2–1	3–1	0–6	1–3
Maine Road	1–1	2–2	2–2	0–2	0–2	0–1	2–1	1–0	5–4	1–1	3–2	1–2	2–3		2–0	4–2	2–0	0–2	2–3	6–1	0–3	2–3
Nelson	1–3	1–2	1–2	0–1	2–2	0–2	1–2	4–0	1–4	2–2	0–3	1–2	0–2	0–1		7–4	2–2	1–2	1–1	0–0	4–4	0–2
New Mills	2–4	2–0	0–1	1–3	2–2	0–5	3–0	6–1	0–3	4–3	2–3	1–1	0–2	2–3	2–1		3–2	2–2	0–1	3–3	1–4	2–1
Padiham	1–3	6–3	1–1	3–0	2–4	1–3	0–2	2–0	0–3	4–0	2–1	1–5	3–2	4–1	1–0	4–2		1–0	2–2	1–0	3–1	4–2
Runcorn Linnets	1–1	2–2	8–0	3–0	2–1	2–0	2–0	5–2	5–0	3–0	5–2	2–5	4–1	1–0	3–1	4–0	4–2		1–1	4–3	2–2	0–2
Runcorn Town	0–2	4–0	3–1	2–1	2–0	2–1	3–4	4–1	3–2	8–0	3–4	3–1	3–0	4–1	1–0	5–0	2–0	3–1		1–1	6–2	4–0
Squires Gate	4–1	1–3	2–3	4–5	1–1	3–4	2–3	0–2	4–3	2–0	1–1	4–4	1–1	1–2	4–3	2–0	1–4	3–2	1–6		1–3	3–3
W Didsbury & C	0–1	1–0	3–0	2–2	2–5	1–3	3–3	4–1	2–4	6–1	3–1	2–2	1–2	1–1	1–0	4–3	1–0	1–4	4–1	2–3		4–2
Winsford United	1–4	0–2	1–1	2–0	2–2	0–2	2–1	2–2	0–3	6–1	4–2	1–3	2–3	3–2	2–0	3–1	2–5	1–1	0–1	4–2	1–3	

Source: "Premier Division Results 2016/17". nwcfl.com.
Legend: Blue = home team win; Yellow = draw; Red = away team win.

=== Stadia and Locations ===
Locations of the 2016–17 North West Counties Football League Premier Division teams

Team	Stadium	Capacity
AFC Darwen	The Anchor Ground	4,000
A.F.C. Liverpool	Marine Travel Arena, Crosby (groundshare with Marine)	3,185
1874 Northwich	Barton Stadium (groundshare with Winsford United)	3,000
Winsford United	Barton Stadium	3,000
Atherton Collieries	Alder Street	2,500
Bootle	Delta Taxis Stadium	2,500
Cammell Laird 1907	North West Construction Stadium, Birkenhead	2,000
Maine Road	Brantingham Road, Chorlton	2,000
Nelson	Victoria Park	2,000
Padiham	Arbories Memorial Sports Ground	1,688
Runcorn Linnets	Millbank Linnets Stadium	1,600
Runcorn Town	Pavilions Sports Complex	1,530
Congleton Town	Richborough Estates Stadium	1,450
New Mills	Church Lane	1,400
Abbey Hey	The Abbey Stadium, Gorton	1,000
Ashton Athletic	Brockstedes Park	1,000
Irlam	Silver Street	1,000
Squires Gate	School Road	1,000
West Didsbury & Chorlton	Brookburn Road, Chorlton	1,000
Hanley Town	Abbey Lane	750
Barnoldswick Town	Silentnight Beds Stadium	
Barnton	Townfield	

== First Division ==
North West Counties Football League First Division
- Season: 2016–17
- Teams: 22
- Champions: Widnes
- Promoted: Widnes; Charnock Richard; City of Liverpool
- Relegated: Ashton Town
- Matches: 462
- Goals: 1,812 (3.92 per match)
- Average attendance: 108

The 2016–17 First Division club allocations from the FA Leagues Committee (subject to appeal) were announced on 12 May 2016. Just prior to the announcement Northwich Manchester Villa resigned from the league which allowed City of Liverpool to successfully appeal against their original allocation to the Step 7 Liverpool County Premier League and take the vacancy that had arisen in the First Division North. The division was expanded from 18 clubs last season to 22 clubs, comprising 13 remaining from the previous season plus 9 additions:

Three clubs relegated from the Premier Division

- AFC Blackpool
- Alsager Town
- Silsden

and six allocated to the division by the FA Leagues Committee

- Carlisle City, promoted from the Northern Football Alliance
- Charnock Richard, promoted from the West Lancashire League
- City of Liverpool, a newly formed club
- FC Oswestry Town, promoted from the Mercian Regional League
- Prestwich Heys, promoted from the Manchester League – a league founder member club returning after a twenty-year absence having been expelled over ground grading issues in 1986
- Sandbach United, promoted from the Cheshire League

The average goals scored per game in the division this season, 3.92, was the best for the First Division (formerly Division Two) for 22 seasons (since 1994–95 when 4.02 per match were scored).

At the end of the season the champions Widnes, runners-up Charnock Richard and promotion play-off winners City of Liverpool (who had finished fourth in the division) were promoted to the Premier Division. Also leaving the division were Ashton Town who were relegated to the Cheshire Association League.

=== League table ===
Pos	Team	Pld	W	D	L	GF	GA	GD	Pts	Season End Notes
1	Widnes (C, P)	42	30	6	6	117	50	+67	96	Promoted to the Premier Division
2	Charnock Richard (P)	42	29	5	8	117	51	+66	92	Promoted to the Premier Division
3	Litherland REMYCA	42	27	8	7	107	60	+47	89	Qualified for promotion play-offs
4	City of Liverpool (O, P)	42	27	7	8	119	45	+74	88	Won the promotion play-offs, promoted to Premier Division (Note: Winner from the four clubs who competed in the promotion play-offs)
5	Whitchurch Alport	42	26	7	9	97	45	+52	85	Qualified for promotion play-offs
6	Sandbach United	42	25	6	11	81	51	+30	81	Qualified for promotion play-offs
7	Alsager Town	42	23	5	14	98	66	+32	74	
8	Prestwich Heys	42	22	3	17	87	62	+25	69	
9	Chadderton	42	20	7	15	103	80	+23	67	
10	Stockport Town	42	19	8	15	92	89	+3	64 (Note: Stockport Town had 1 point deducted for a rule contravention)	
11	Silsden	42	20	2	20	83	77	+6	62	
12	Cheadle Town	42	18	7	17	97	83	+14	61	
13	St Helens Town	42	16	8	18	88	95	−7	56	
14	Carlisle City	42	16	6	20	72	92	−20	54	
15	FC Oswestry Town	42	16	5	21	73	97	−24	53	
16	Daisy Hill	42	14	7	21	82	111	−29	49	
17	Holker Old Boys	42	12	7	23	65	94	−29	43	
18	Bacup Borough	42	11	7	24	45	78	−33	40	
19	AFC Blackpool	42	7	11	24	48	114	−66	32	
20	Atherton Laburnum Rovers	42	8	4	30	44	95	−51	28	
21	Eccleshall	42	4	6	32	55	145	−90	18	
22	Ashton Town (R)	42	5	2	35	42	132	−90	17	Relegated to the Cheshire Association League

Source: "Final Tables, Season 2016/17". nwcfl.com., "North West Counties League - North West Counties League Division One North: 2016 – 17: League Table". nonleaguematters.co.uk.
Rules for classification: 1) Points; 2) Goal difference; 3) Number of goals scored; 4) Number of matches won; 5) Head-to-head results
(C) Champions; (O) Play-off winners; (P) Promoted; (R) Relegated

=== Results ===
Home \ Away	ABL	ALS	AST	ALR	BAC	CAR	CHD	CHR	CHE	LIV	DSH	ECC	OSW	HOB	LIT	PRH	SAN	SIL	STH	STK	WHI	WID
AFC Blackpool		2–1	0–5	1–1	2–3	2–3	0–0	1–3	1–1	2–2	0–4	1–1	0–3	0–1	3–5	0–5	2–1	0–6	1–3	2–2	0–0	1–5
Alsager Town	6–1		3–1	3–1	5–0	2–0	0–3	1–2	2–1	0–2	4–2	6–1	0–0	1–1	0–3	1–2	3–1	2–1	3–2	3–1	0–1	1–2
Ashton Town	3–0	0–4		2–3	1–2	3–2	1–4	1–5	1–3	0–1	2–1	3–3	1–3	2–0	0–4	0–2	0–1	2–3	0–2	0–2	0–9	0–6
Atherton Lab. R	1–2	0–2	2–1		1–1	6–1	1–4	2–2	0–3	0–1	1–2	1–2	1–2	0–1	1–2	1–0	1–3	0–1	4–2	0–2	0–1	2–4
Bacup Borough	4–0	0–4	4–0	2–2		1–3	0–2	1–4	2–3	1–2	2–1	1–2	0–1	2–0	0–3	2–3	0–2	2–1	1–1	2–1	0–0	0–1
Carlisle City	3–1	5–3	4–2	3–0	0–0		0–1	2–3	2–1	0–6	6–2	2–1	2–1	2–2	1–3	1–0	0–3	2–1	4–3	2–2	0–0	0–3
Chadderton	7–0	1–3	5–1	3–5	1–0	4–0		1–2	1–1	1–3	5–4	9–0	4–2	3–2	1–1	3–3	1–0	1–2	2–5	2–3	3–0	1–2
Charnock Richard	2–3	1–4	3–0	2–1	3–0	2–2	3–0		6–1	4–3	3–0	3–1	1–0	8–0	0–1	5–2	3–1	0–0	1–3	2–2	2–3	4–2
Cheadle Town	2–2	1–2	3–0	6–0	0–1	2–1	5–4	2–5		1–5	4–0	3–5	1–4	3–1	0–3	2–0	1–2	5–2	3–3	2–0	3–3	1–4
City of Liverpool	6–2	2–0	0–0	8–0	3–2	6–1	5–1	1–1	1–2		2–2	4–0	1–0	6–1	2–4	4–0	0–0	2–1	5–1	4–2	2–3	1–2
Daisy Hill	1–0	3–2	2–0	3–2	1–2	1–2	2–2	0–7	1–4	2–1		2–1	3–1	2–1	0–0	1–4	3–3	5–4	2–2	5–2	3–7	2–2
Eccleshall	0–4	4–4	5–4	0–1	1–2	2–4	1–7	0–3	1–5	1–2	3–3		1–2	2–2	1–2	1–3	1–6	2–4	0–4	2–3	0–5	1–3
FC Oswestry T	2–2	2–4	3–1	3–1	3–0	2–1	4–5	0–5	2–1	0–4	0–1	2–2		4–2	0–4	4–0	1–5	6–6	3–2	0–0	0–3	1–3
Holker OB	0–1	1–2	4–2	2–0	1–1	4–3	1–4	0–3	2–5	1–2	3–2	4–1	7–1		1–0	1–3	0–1	1–2	2–1	2–2	3–0	0–1
Litherland R	2–2	4–1	5–1	3–0	4–2	3–0	2–2	2–3	3–3	2–3	3–2	3–1	4–2	2–0		0–2	1–1	1–2	1–2	5–3	2–2	6–5
Prestwich Heys	0–1	1–2	2–1	6–0	5–0	4–0	0–0	0–3	2–1	1–0	2–1	5–2	5–2	5–1	2–3		0–2	2–0	3–0	0–1	1–2	1–3
Sandbach United	1–0	3–3	5–1	1–0	1–0	1–1	2–0	3–1	2–1	2–1	3–2	3–1	4–1	1–2	0–2	1–3		2–0	2–1	1–3	0–3	3–0
Silsden	5–2	2–1	6–0	2–0	2–1	2–1	1–0	0–1	0–3	0–2	7–2	2–1	0–3	3–2	0–1	3–2	1–2		1–4	1–2	0–3	1–4
St Helens Town	2–2	2–2	2–0	3–0	2–0	3–4	1–3	2–3	4–2	2–2	4–2	1–0	2–1	4–2	2–4	2–2	2–4	2–6		2–0	2–3	1–1
Stockport Town	3–1	3–2	7–0	3–2	1–1	3–1	3–4	1–0	1–5	0–10	3–4	7–1	2–3	2–2	4–0	3–1	2–1	2–1	3–1		1–5	2–3
Whitchurch Alport	2–1	1–2	4–0	2–1	3–0	3–1	3–0	0–2	0–0	1–2	2–0	5–0	2–0	3–0	1–2	1–3	1–1	0–1	3–0	2–1		2–5
Widnes	7–0	1–4	3–0	3–0	2–0	3–1	1–2	2–1	2–1	0–0	3–1	5–0	5–0	2–2	2–2	1–0	2–0	1–0	8–0	2–2	1–3	

Source: "First Division Results 2016/17". nwcfl.com.
Legend: Blue = home team win; Yellow = draw; Red = away team win.

=== Promotion play-offs ===
The 2016–17 First Division promotion play-offs contested by the clubs that finished third to sixth in the league table were won by league newcomers City of Liverpool who had been fourth-placed in the division.

Semi-finals
3	Litherland REMYCA	1
6	Sandbach United	0
4	City of Liverpool	1
5	Whitchurch Alport	0

Final
3	Litherland REMYCA	0
4	City of Liverpool	3

Source: NWCFL First Division Play Off Results: 2016/17 Season

==== Semi-finals ====
6 May 2017	City of Liverpool	1–0	Whitchurch Alport	Bootle
	Roberts 58'	Report		Stadium: New Bucks Park; Attendance: 747

6 May 2017	Litherland REMYCA	1–0	Sandbach United	Litherland
	Ryan 19'	Report		Stadium: Litherland Sports Park; Attendance: 201

==== Final ====
13 May 2017	Litherland REMYCA	0–3	City of Liverpool	Litherland
		Report	McDonald 47', 50'; Williams 56'	Stadium: Litherland Sports Park; Attendance: 1,303

=== Stadia & Locations ===
Locations of the 2016–17 North West Counties Football League First Division teams

Team	Stadium	Capacity
Widnes	Select Security Stadium (groundshare with Widnes Vikings Rugby League Club)	13,350
Carlisle City	Gillford Park Stadium	4,000
Atherton Laburnum Rovers	Crilly Park	3,000
Bacup Borough	West View	3,000
City of Liverpool	Delta Taxis Stadium (groundshare with Bootle)	2,500
Holker Old Boys	Rakesmoor Lane Barrow-in-Furness	2,500
Stockport Town	Stockport Sports Village	2,384
F.C. Oswestry Town	Park Hall Stadium	2,034
Ashton Town	Edge Green Street	2,000
Cheadle Town	Park Road Stadium	2,000
Daisy Hill	New Sirs Westhoughton	2,000
Eccleshall	Pershall Park	2,000
A.F.C. Blackpool	The Mechanics	1,500
Alsager Town	Wood Park Stadium	1,500
Chadderton	MCA Stadium	1,500
Silsden	Keighley Road Stadium	1,500
Charnock Richard	Mossie Park	
Litherland REMYCA	Litherland Sports Park	
Prestwich Heys	Aide Moran Park	
Sandbach United	Sandbach Community Football Centre *	
St Helens Town	Ruskin Drive Sportsground *	
Whitchurch Alport	Yockings Park	

- As their ground was not ready, St Helens Town played the majority of their home matches in 2016–17 at Volair Park, home of Prescot Cables, with the remainder being played at Edge Green Street, home of Ashton Town.
- Until their floodlight system was ready, Sandbach United played home evening matches at Alsager Town's ground.
- Owing to fixture congestion at their home ground, Widnes played some of their home games at Townfield, home of Barnton.

== League Challenge Cup ==
The 2016–17 League Challenge Cup (known as the Macron Challenge Cup for sponsorship reasons) was a knockout competition open to all the league's 44 clubs. The final, played at Fleetwood Town F.C., was won by First Division club City of Liverpool who defeated Premier Division club Barnoldswick Town 3–2 on penalties after the match finished 1–1 after extra time (score at 90 minutes: 1–1). League newcomers City of Liverpool were the first Division (formerly Division Two) club for sixteen seasons to win the League Challenge Cup (since Formby in 2001 ) and they completed a League Challenge Cup and First Division Trophy double (only previously achieved by Cammell Laird in 2005) and also won the First Division promotion play-off final.

=== First round ===
The cup holders Atherton Collieries were exempt from the first round which therefore included 43 clubs from which 12 first round ties drawn, with the remaining clubs receiving byes to the next round.

(Appended to club names in the results listings below: '(PD)'=Premier Division club; '(FD)'=First Division club)

Home team (division)	Score	Away team (division)
Barnton (PD)	1–2	Nelson (PD)
Carlisle City (FD)	0–2	Ashton Athletic (PD)
Congleton Town (PD)	3–4 (a.e.t.) (90min: 3–3)	Prestwich Heys (FD)
FC Oswestry Town (FD)	1–1 (a.e.t.) (90min: 1–1) (5–4 p)	Irlam (PD)
Padiham (PD)	2–3	1874 Northwich (PD)
Runcorn Linnets (PD)	4–2	Daisy Hill (FD)
Sandbach United (FD)	4–2	Stockport Town (FD)
Squires Gate (PD)	0–1	New Mills (PD)
St Helens Town (FD)	4–2	AFC Darwen (PD)
West Didsbury & Chorlton (PD)	1–3	Barnoldswick Town (PD)
Widnes (FD)	5–3 (Note: Match played at Alsager Town F.C.)	Alsager Town (FD)
Winsford United (PD)	4–0	Atherton Laburnum Rovers (FD)
The remaining 20 clubs received byes to the second round

=== Second round ===
Home team (division)	Score	Away team (division)
1874 Northwich (PD)	2–1	AFC Blackpool (FD)
Ashton Town (FD)	1–3	Abbey Hey (PD)
Barnoldswick Town (PD)	2–1	Cammell Laird 1907 (PD)
Bootle (PD)	3–0	AFC Liverpool (PD)
Eccleshall (FD)	3–5	St Helens Town (FD)
Hanley Town (PD)	2–1 (a.e.t.) (90min: 1–1)	Charnock Richard (FD)
Holker Old Boys (FD)	3–6	Chadderton (FD)
Nelson (PD)	1–0	FC Oswestry Town (FD)
New Mills (PD)	2–8	Silsden (FD)
Prestwich Heys (FD)	1–3	City of Liverpool (FD)
Runcorn Linnets (PD)	2–3	Ashton Athletic (PD)
Runcorn Town (PD)	3–2	Bacup Borough (FD)
Sandbach United (FD)	1–2	Atherton Collieries (PD)
Whitchurch Alport (FD)	1–2	Maine Road (PD)
Widnes (FD)	3–0 (Note: Match played at Barnton F.C.)	Cheadle Town (FD)
Winsford United (PD)	1–0	Litherland REMYCA (FD)

=== Third round ===
Home team (division)	Score	Away team (division)
Abbey Hey (PD)	1–1 (a.e.t.) (90min: 0–0) (3–4 p) (Note: Match venue moved to Barnoldswick Town following weather related postponements)	Barnoldswick Town (PD)
Ashton Athletic (PD)	2–0	Runcorn Town (PD)
City of Liverpool (FD)	2–0	Hanley Town (PD)
Maine Road (PD)	1–3	Chadderton (FD)
Nelson (PD)	3–0	Atherton Collieries (PD)
Silsden (FD)	1–0 (a.e.t.) (90min: 0–0)	1874 Northwich (PD)
St Helens Town (FD)	1–5 (Note: Match venue moved to Bootle following weather related postponements)	Bootle (PD)
Winsford United (PD)	1–2 (a.e.t.) (90min: 1–1)	Widnes (FD)

=== Quarter-finals ===
Home team (division)	Score	Away team (division)
Ashton Athletic (PD)	2–5 (a.e.t.) (90min: 2–2)	Bootle (PD)
Nelson (PD)	1–3	Chadderton (FD)
Silsden (FD)	0–2	City of Liverpool (FD)
Widnes (FD)	0–1	Barnoldswick Town (PD)

=== Semi–Finals ===
The semi-finals were decided on aggregate score from two legs played

Tie	Home team (division)	Score	Away team (division)
1	City of Liverpool (FD)	0–2	Chadderton (FD)
1	Chadderton (FD)	0–2 (a.e.t.) (90min: 0–2) (3–4 p)	City of Liverpool (FD)
1	City of Liverpool won 3–4 on penalties following a 2–2 aggregate draw		
2	Barnoldswick Town (PD)	1–0	Bootle (PD)
2	Bootle (PD)	2–3	Barnoldswick Town (PD)
2	Barnoldswick Town won 4–2 on aggregate		

=== Final ===
Team (division)	Score	Team (division)
Played 16 May 2017 at Fleetwood Town F.C., Highbury Stadium
Barnoldswick Town (PD)	1–1 (a.e.t.) (90min: 1–1) (2–3 p)	City of Liverpool (FD)

source: "League Challenge Cup: 2016/17 Season". nwcfl.com.

== First Division Trophy ==
The 2016–17 First Division Trophy (known as the Reusch First Division Cup for sponsorship reasons) was a knockout competition for the 22 First Division clubs only. The final, held at Runcorn Linnets F.C., was won 1–0 as part of a League Challenge Cup and First Division Trophy double by league newcomers City of Liverpool who defeated Sandbach United.

=== First round ===
For the first two rounds the competition was split into North and South groups. Six clubs from each group were drawn into first round matches, the remaining 10 clubs each received a bye to the second round.

Home team	Score	Away team
North Section
AFC Blackpool	2–3	Carlisle City
Bacup Borough	1–2 (a.e.t.) (90min: 1–1)	Chadderton
Holker Old Boys	4–1	Ashton Town
South Section
Eccleshall	1–7	Stockport Town
Prestwich Heys	2–1	Litherland REMYCA
Widnes	4–1	FC Oswestry Town
The remaining 10 clubs received byes to the second round

=== Second round ===
Home team	Score	Away team
North Section
Carlisle City	3–2	Atherton Laburnum Rovers
Charnock Richard	2–0	Chadderton
Holker Old Boys	3–1	Silsden
St Helens Town	2–0	Daisy Hill
South Section
City of Liverpool	2–1	Cheadle Town
Sandbach United	5–0	Stockport Town
Whitchurch Alport	4–0	Alsager Town
Widnes	4–0	Prestwich Heys

=== Quarter-finals ===
Home team	Score	Away team
Carlisle City	0–1	Sandbach United
Charnock Richard	1–4	Widnes
Holker Old Boys	3–2 (a.e.t.) (90min: 1–1)	Whitchurch Alport
St Helens Town	0–3	City of Liverpool

=== Semi–Finals ===
The semi-finals were decided on aggregate score from two legs played

Tie	Home team	Score	Away team
1	Holker Old Boys	1–3	Sandbach United
1	Sandbach United	2–3	Holker Old Boys
1	Sandbach United won 5–4 on aggregate		
2	Widnes	0–1	City of Liverpool
2	City of Liverpool	3–0	Widnes
2	City of Liverpool won 4–0 on aggregate		

=== Final ===
Team	Score	Team
Played 1 May 2017 at Runcorn Linnets F.C., Millbank Linnets Stadium
City of Liverpool	1–0	Sandbach United

source: "First Division Trophy: 2016/17 Season". nwcfl.com.
