= 2014–15 North West Counties Football League =

The 2014–15 North West Counties Football League season was the 33rd in the history of the North West Counties Football League, a football competition in England.

The league comprised two divisions, the Premier Division and the First Division (at levels 9 and 10 of the English football league system, Steps 5 and 6 of the National League System respectively). Additionally there were two cup competitions: the League Challenge Cup (known as the Men United Cup for sponsorship reasons) knockout competition open to all the league's clubs; and the First Division Trophy (known as the Reusch First Division Cup for sponsorship reasons), a knockout trophy competition for First Division clubs only.

This season in addition to the clubs finishing in the first two places in the table being promoted from the First Division to the Premier Division a third promotion place was instigated with the winner of a play-off between the clubs finishing third to sixth in the table also to be promoted (and a third club to be relegated in the opposite direction).

== Premier Division ==
North West Counties Football League Premier Division
- Season: 2014–15
- Teams: 21
- Champions: Glossop North End
- Promoted: Glossop North End
- Relegated: Bacup & Rossendale Borough; St Helens Town
- Matches: 420
- Goals: 1,375 (3.27 per match)
- Average attendance: 150

At the commencement of the season the Premier Division featured 22 teams, 20 remaining from the previous season plus 2 additions (both promoted from the First Division:

- Nelson, promoted as champions
- 1874 Northwich promoted from third place

During the season in March 2015 the number of clubs in the division was reduced to 21 when Stockport Sports were expelled from the league and their playing record expunged (P:27, W:3, D:5, L:19, GF:34, GA 98).

As in the previous season clubs wishing to be promoted from the Premier Division had to meet the National League System promotion criteria; five clubs applied for promotion: 1874 Northwich; A.F.C. Liverpool; Colne; Glossop North End; Runcorn Linnets.

At the end of the season the champions Glossop North End (who achieved a league and cup double) were promoted to the Northern Premier League Division One North. The clubs finishing in the bottom two places in the table (excluding the now expelled Stockport Sports), St Helens Town and Bacup & Rossendale Borough were relegated to the First Division. For league founder member club St Helens Town it was the last of 33 continuous seasons that they had been ever-present members of the league's top division.

=== League table ===
Pos	Team	Pld	W	D	L	GF	GA	GD	Pts	Season End Notes
1	Glossop North End (C, P)	40	33	3	4	100	23	+77	102	Promoted to Northern Premier; League Division One North
2	Runcorn Linnets	40	28	8	4	89	39	+50	92	
3	1874 Northwich	40	26	8	6	90	35	+55	86	
4	Colne	40	25	5	10	86	47	+39	80	
5	Ashton Athletic	40	21	12	7	69	38	+31	75	
6	Squires Gate	40	17	16	7	62	42	+20	67	
7	Bootle	40	19	6	15	76	63	+13	63	
8	Congleton Town	40	17	9	14	68	57	+11	60	
9	AFC Liverpool	40	17	8	15	74	56	+18	59	
10	Silsden	40	16	8	16	55	62	−7	56	
11	Nelson	40	16	7	17	69	64	+5	55	
12	Winsford United	40	15	10	15	66	62	+4	55	
13	Runcorn Town	40	13	8	19	72	75	−3	47	
14	Abbey Hey	40	14	5	21	56	74	−18	47	
15	Maine Road	40	12	9	19	52	75	−23	45	
16	West Didsbury & Chorlton	40	13	4	23	57	84	−27	43	
17	Alsager Town	40	12	6	22	64	87	−23	42	
18	AFC Blackpool	40	7	9	24	37	81	−44	30	
19	Barnoldswick Town	40	7	6	27	45	98	−53	27	
20	St Helens Town (R)	40	7	5	28	46	115	−69	26	Relegated to First Division
21	Bacup & Rossendale Borough (R)	40	6	6	28	42	98	−56	24	Relegated to First Division
22	Stockport Sports	0	0	0	0	0	0	0	0 (Note: Stockport Sports were expelled on 2 March 2015; their record of P:27, W:3, D:5, L:19, GF:34, GA 98 was expunged.)	Expelled (record expunged)

Source: "Final Tables, Season 2014/15". nwcfl.com., "North West Counties League - North West Counties League Premier Division: 2014 – 15: League Table". nonleaguematters.co.uk.
Rules for classification: 1) points; 2) goal difference; 3) number of goals scored.
(C) Champions; (P) Promoted; (R) Relegated

=== Results ===
Home \ Away	18N	ABH	ABL	ALV	ALS	ASH	BAC	BWT	BTL	CLN	CON	GNE	MNR	NEL	RNL	RNT	SIL	SQG	STH	STS (Note: Match results included for Stockport Sports who were expelled from the league are not included in the league table)	WDC	WNS
1874 Northwich		3–0	2–3	0–1	1–0	0–0	6–2	3–1	1–0	1–4	2–0	1–0	4–2	0–0	0–0	3–0	6–1	1–1	5–0		4–2	0–1
Abbey Hey	0–4		2–2	4–2	2–4	0–0	3–0	2–1	1–4	1–3	2–4	2–3	0–1	3–0	0–5	0–2	1–2	1–2	3–1	2–3	1–4	2–1
AFC Blackpool	0–3	1–2		2–2	1–4	1–1	1–1	0–0	2–1	1–2	2–1	1–5	1–2	0–2	1–3	0–4	0–2	0–0	2–1	2–2	1–3	2–2
AFC Liverpool	2–2	3–1	4–1		3–4	1–1	3–0	3–1	0–1	1–5	1–1	0–1	4–2	4–0	0–0	2–1	2–0	0–0	7–3		3–1	1–2
Alsager Town	1–1	0–3	2–0	0–1		1–1	1–0	1–2	2–3	1–1	0–3	0–4	6–0	2–1	3–4	2–5	3–4	0–2	4–2	2–0	2–0	1–1
Ashton Athletic	1–1	1–0	5–0	0–1	2–1		2–0	2–0	2–1	3–2	1–1	1–2	3–1	0–2	0–1	0–0	2–2	4–0	4–3	0–0	2–0	2–1
Bacup & Ross. B	0–4	0–2	2–0	1–0	2–3	1–2		0–3	4–2	0–3	2–2	0–6	1–1	1–2	0–3	4–3	1–2	3–4	2–6	1–3	1–3	3–2
Barnoldswick T.	1–4	1–2	3–2	1–1	2–1	1–6	0–0		1–2	1–4	1–3	0–2	1–1	1–0	1–5	1–6	0–4	1–3	4–1	5–0	2–4	1–1
Bootle	2–2	4–2	3–1	1–2	3–0	2–2	5–0	2–3		2–4	2–1	0–5	1–4	1–1	1–1	0–2	1–0	1–1	3–0	3–0	1–2	3–1
Colne	0–1	1–0	4–0	2–0	2–2	0–0	1–0	4–2	0–4		1–3	0–6	3–1	2–0	0–3	5–1	3–0	3–0	4–0	3–0	5–0	1–0
Congleton Town	1–2	1–1	0–4	2–0	0–2	1–1	4–2	3–1	2–1	1–3		1–3	6–2	2–1	1–2	1–0	4–2	0–0	2–0		2–1	0–1
Glossop NE	0–2	2–0	1–0	1–0	4–0	3–0	3–1	2–0	4–2	2–1	0–0		2–0	3–0	0–2	1–3	1–1	3–2	4–0	6–0	6–0	4–0
Maine Road	1–0	0–4	0–1	2–3	1–0	0–1	3–0	1–0	1–1	2–0	0–0	0–3		4–1	1–3	2–2	4–1	2–3	1–2	2–2	1–0	2–2
Nelson	1–4	0–3	2–0	2–1	3–0	3–2	2–0	5–0	2–3	1–3	1–0	1–2	0–0		2–1	1–1	2–3	3–3	4–0		2–2	4–2
Runcorn Linnets	3–2	2–2	3–2	2–0	4–1	0–3	3–2	6–2	2–1	1–1	4–3	0–1	1–1	2–1		2–1	2–0	2–0	1–0	3–2	6–0	2–0
Runcorn Town	2–3	0–1	1–1	2–1	3–2	1–3	1–4	1–0	1–2	1–3	3–0	0–0	0–1	2–2	1–1		3–1	2–7	7–2		1–2	3–4
Silsden	0–2	4–1	2–0	1–0	1–1	2–1	1–1	2–0	0–1	1–0	0–3	0–1	2–0	0–4	2–3	2–1		0–0	2–1		6–1	0–0
Squires Gate	0–1	1–1	1–0	2–1	7–2	1–2	2–0	0–0	1–0	0–0	1–1	0–2	3–1	3–0	1–1	2–0	2–0		1–1	3–2	2–0	2–2
St Helens Town	1–4	1–0	3–0	0–9	0–4	0–2	2–0	4–3	1–2	2–5	1–3	1–3	2–0	1–6	0–1	2–2	1–1	0–0		2–4	0–3	1–1
Stockport Sports (Note: Match results included for Stockport Sports who were expelled from the league are not included in the league table)	0–5	0–4									5–5	0–8	1–3	1–5	2–8	1–6	1–3		0–2		1–2	1–4
W Didsbury & C	0–2	0–1	0–0	2–3	4–0	0–2	2–1	3–2	1–4	0–1	1–3	0–1	2–2	2–5	2–0	1–2	1–1	1–2	3–0	6–0		3–0
Winsford United	1–3	5–0	0–1	2–2	4–1	1–2	0–0	2–0	1–3	2–0	3–2	1–4	6–2	1–0	0–2	4–2	2–0	0–0	3–0	3–3	4–1	

Source: "Premier Division Results 2014/15". nwcfl.com.
Legend: Blue = home team win; Yellow = draw; Red = away team win.

=== Stadia and Locations ===
Locations of the 2014–15 North West Counties Football League Premier Division teams

Team	Stadium	Capacity
A.F.C. Liverpool	Arriva Stadium, Crosby (groundshare with Marine)	3,185
1874 Northwich	Barton Stadium (groundshare with Winsford United)	3,000
Bacup & Rossendale Borough	West View	3,000
Winsford United	Barton Stadium	3,000
Bootle	Delta Taxis Stadium	2,500
Stockport Sports	The Neil Rourke Memorial Stadium	2,384
Glossop North End	The Arthur Goldthorpe Stadium	2,374
Silsden	The Asda Foundation Stadium	2,300
Maine Road	Brantingham Road, Chorlton	2,000
Nelson	Little Wembley	2,000
Colne	XLCR Vehicle Management Stadium	1,800
Runcorn Linnets	Millbank Linnets Stadium	1,600
Runcorn Town	Pavilions Sports Complex	1,530
A.F.C. Blackpool	The Mechanics	1,500
Alsager Town	Wood Park Stadium	1,500
Congleton Town	Booth Street	1,450
Abbey Hey	The Abbey Stadium, Gorton	1,000
Ashton Athletic	Brockstedes Park	1,000
Squires Gate	School Road	1,000
St Helens Town	Brockstedes Park (groundshare with Ashton Athletic)	1,000
Barnoldswick Town	Silentnight Stadium	
West Didsbury & Chorlton	Brookburn Road, Chorlton	

== First Division ==
North West Counties Football League First Division
- Season: 2014–15
- Teams: 19
- Champions: Atherton Collieries
- Promoted: Atherton Collieries, Cammell Laird; AFC Darwen
- Matches: 342
- Goals: 1,335 (3.9 per match)
- Average attendance: 64

The First Division featured 19 teams, 15 remaining from the previous season plus 4 additions (with those from outside the league allocated by the FA Leagues Committee):

- Barnton, promoted from Cheshire Association Football League Division One
- Litherland REMYCA, promoted from Liverpool County Premier League Premier Division
- Wigan Robin Park, relegated from the Premier Division
- Cammell Laird 1907, resigned from Northern Premier League Division One North

From this season a third promotion place to the Premier Division was available with a play-off between the clubs finishing third to sixth in the table.

At the end of the season the champions Atherton Collieries, runners-up Cammell Laird 1907 and promotion play-off winners AFC Darwen (who had finished third in the division) were promoted to the Premier Division. The two clubs who finished in the last two places in the table resigned from the league: league founder member club Oldham Boro (who had joined as Oldham Dew in Division Three) and Wigan Robin Park.

=== League table ===
Pos	Team	Pld	W	D	L	GF	GA	GD	Pts	Season End Notes
1	Atherton Collieries (C, P)	36	31	3	2	129	26	+103	96	Promoted to Premier Division
2	Cammell Laird 1907 (P)	36	28	5	3	114	35	+79	89	Promoted to Premier Division
3	AFC Darwen (O, P)	36	20	8	8	103	60	+43	68	Won promotion play-offs; promoted to Premier Division (Note: Winner from the four clubs who competed in the promotion play-offs)
4	Hanley Town	36	21	4	11	89	63	+26	67	Qualified for promotion play-offs
5	Holker Old Boys	36	18	6	12	79	50	+29	60	Qualified for promotion play-offs
6	Chadderton	36	18	6	12	68	56	+12	60	Qualified for promotion play-offs
7	Barnton	36	18	5	13	77	66	+11	59	
8	Daisy Hill	36	15	7	14	57	68	−11	52	
9	Litherland REMYCA	36	13	8	15	72	73	−1	47	
10	Cheadle Town	36	13	7	16	68	67	+1	46	
11	Northwich Flixton Villa	36	12	9	15	73	65	+8	45	
12	Atherton Laburnum Rovers	36	12	7	17	46	70	−24	43	
13	Rochdale Town	36	11	9	16	71	84	−13	42	
14	Irlam	36	11	8	17	51	64	−13	41	
15	Eccleshall	36	12	5	19	47	91	−44	41	
16	Widnes	36	10	5	21	62	101	−39	35	
17	Ashton Town	36	7	6	23	51	78	−27	27	
18	Oldham Boro	36	6	7	23	37	105	−68	25	Resigned (after the season)
19	Wigan Robin Park	36	7	3	26	41	113	−72	24	Resigned (after the season)

Source: "Final Tables, Season 2014/15". nwcfl.com., "North West Counties League - North West Counties League Division One North: 2014 – 15: League Table". nonleaguematters.co.uk.
Rules for classification: 1) points; 2) goal difference; 3) number of goals scored.
(C) Champions; (O) Play-off winners; (P) Promoted

=== Results ===
Home \ Away	ADR	AST	ACO	ALR	BAR	CAM	CHA	CHT	DSH	ECC	HAN	HOB	IRL	LIT	NFV	OLD	RCH	WID	WRP
AFC Darwen		2–1	2–0	3–1	5–1	2–1	0–1	2–2	0–2	3–2	0–3	2–0	4–1	1–1	5–4	9–0	4–3	6–1	7–2
Ashton Town	1–2		2–2	5–0	3–4	1–2	0–3	1–0	1–1	1–2	1–2	4–2	3–1	3–3	3–2	2–3	3–0	1–4	1–1
Atherton Colls.	4–1	3–0		4–0	2–1	2–2	5–1	3–1	5–3	5–1	5–0	3–1	3–0	6–0	3–0	5–0	6–1	3–0	5–1
Atherton Lab. R	2–2	3–0	0–3		0–3	1–3	0–3	2–1	1–0	2–2	5–3	1–0	1–1	2–0	1–2	2–6	2–1	2–0	1–4
Barnton	3–3	1–0	0–3	0–1		1–6	1–0	2–2	2–3	2–1	1–6	0–3	3–2	1–0	2–2	1–1	4–1	7–0	6–1
Cammell L. 1907	3–1	4–0	1–2	1–1	4–3		5–0	3–0	5–0	5–0	2–0	1–0	3–1	5–1	3–1	5–2	2–2	6–1	4–1
Chadderton	1–6	1–0	0–3	2–0	3–2	1–0		0–1	4–1	3–0	3–2	1–3	4–1	2–2	2–2	0–0	1–4	2–1	3–2
Cheadle Town	1–1	1–2	1–2	2–1	0–3	3–4	1–1		1–0	2–3	0–2	0–0	0–3	4–3	2–1	3–1	2–2	3–5	8–1
Daisy Hill	0–5	2–2	0–0	4–0	2–1	1–2	1–2	4–3		3–1	2–4	1–0	0–2	2–0	0–1	1–0	2–1	0–4	4–0
Eccleshall	1–1	2–1	1–3	2–1	0–2	1–5	2–1	0–1	2–3		1–7	1–1	3–2	3–2	1–0	2–1	0–2	0–6	4–3
Hanley Town	3–1	6–0	0–6	1–1	3–1	0–4	0–2	3–2	1–1	1–1		4–2	3–0	3–0	2–4	3–1	1–1	2–1	1–2
Holker OB	6–2	3–1	1–3	2–1	0–0	2–4	1–0	4–2	5–0	5–1	5–2		2–0	1–3	4–1	3–0	2–3	5–0	2–2
Irlam	2–1	2–1	1–5	0–3	2–1	1–1	1–0	2–2	1–2	2–2	0–2	2–0		2–0	2–2	0–0	1–0	1–1	4–1
Litherland R	3–3	2–1	1–3	1–1	0–2	3–3	2–1	1–3	3–3	1–4	2–0	1–4	2–0		2–1	7–1	6–2	1–2	4–0
Northwich Fl. V	0–1	2–1	3–2	4–0	1–2	0–1	1–4	2–1	1–2	3–0	2–3	2–2	3–3	1–1		0–0	4–1	10–1	1–0
Oldham Boro	2–2	3–1	0–5	1–3	1–5	0–5	1–6	1–2	2–2	2–0	1–6	0–1	0–5	1–3	2–2		0–4	1–0	1–0
Rochdale Town	1–3	3–1	0–4	2–2	2–3	0–1	2–2	2–4	1–1	5–1	0–5	0–0	2–1	1–3	5–2	5–1		4–4	3–3
Widnes	0–4	2–2	0–5	2–3	2–4	0–5	2–2	0–4	4–2	5–0	2–3	1–2	3–2	1–4	1–1	2–0	1–2		2–0
Wigan Robin P	1–7	2–1	0–6	1–0	1–2	0–3	1–6	0–3	1–2	0–1	1–2	1–5	1–0	0–4	0–5	3–1	2–3	2–1	

Source: "First Division Results 2014/15". nwcfl.com.
Legend: Blue = home team win; Yellow = draw; Red = away team win.

=== Promotion play-offs ===
The 2014–15 First Division promotion play-offs contested by the clubs finishing 3rd to 6th in the division were won by AFC Darwen, who had finished third in the table.

Semi-finals
3	AFC Darwen	2
6	Chadderton	1
4	Hanley Town	3
5	Holker Old Boys	1

Final
3	AFC Darwen	5
4	Hanley Town	3

Source: First Division Play Off Results: 2014/15 Season

==== Semi-finals ====
28 April 2015	AFC Darwen	2–1	Chadderton	Darwen
	Coote 60'; Lynch 85'	Report	Turner 23'	Stadium: Anchor Ground; Attendance: 359

28 April 2015	Hanley Town	3–1	Holker Old Boys	Stoke-on-Trent
20:00	Bell 63'; Skellern 67'; Stair 83'	Report	Stanway 89'	Stadium: Potteries Park; Attendance: 202

==== Final ====
2 May 2015	AFC Darwen	5–3	Hanley Town	Darwen
15:00	McKenna 18'; Steele 32' (pen.), 66' (pen.), 82'; Gaul 46'	Report	Stair 5' (pen.); Morton 48'; Skellern 50'	Stadium: Anchor Ground; Attendance: 842

=== Locations ===
Locations of the 2014–15 North West Counties Football League First Division teams

Team	Stadium	Capacity
Widnes	Select Security Stadium	13,350
AFC Darwen	The Anchor Ground	4,000
Oldham Boro	Seel Park (groundshare with Mossley A.F.C.)	4,000
Atherton Laburnum Rovers	Crilly Park	3,000
Atherton Collieries	Alder Street	2,500
Holker Old Boys	Rakesmoor Lane Barrow-in-Furness	2,500
Ashton Town	Edge Green Street	2,000
Cammell Laird 1907	MBS Stadium, Birkenhead	2,000
Cheadle Town	Park Road Stadium	2,000
Daisy Hill	New Sirs Westhoughton	2,000
Northwich Flixton Villa	Valley Road, Flixton (groundshare with Northwich Victoria)	2,000
Chadderton	Andrew Street	1,500
Rochdale Town	Castleton Sports Centre	1,500
Wigan Robin Park	Robin Park Arena	1,200
Eccleshall	Pershall Park	1,000
Irlam	Silver Street	1,000
Hanley Town	Abbey Lane	750
Barnton	Townfield	
Litherland REMYCA	Litherland Sports Park	

== League Challenge Cup ==
The 2014–15 League Challenge Cup (known as the Men United Cup for sponsorship reasons) was a knockout competition open to all the league's 41 clubs. The final, played at Curzon Ashton F.C., was won 2–0 as part of a league and cup double by Premier Division club Glossop North End who defeated Atherton Collieries of the First Division. Atherton had previously lost in the final of the First Division Trophy competition.

=== First round ===
All the Premier Division 22 clubs together with Oldham Boro of the First Division received byes to the second round.

(Appended to club names in the results listings below: '(PD)'=Premier Division club; '(FD)'=First Division club)

Home team (division)	Score	Away team (division)
Ashton Town (FD)	6–2	Chadderton (FD)
Atherton Collieries (FD)	4–2 (a.e.t.) (90min: 2–2)	Cheadle Town (FD)
Barnton (FD)	0–1	Widnes (FD)
Cammell Laird 1907 (FD)	4–1	Northwich Flixton Villa (FD)
Daisy Hill (FD)	2–1 (a.e.t.) (90min: 1–1)	Atherton Laburnum Rovers (FD)
Eccleshall (FD)	1–3	Rochdale Town (FD)
Holker Old Boys (FD)	0–3	AFC Darwen (FD)
Irlam (FD)	4–1	Litherland REMYCA (FD)
Wigan Robin Park (FD)	2–3	Hanley Town (FD)

=== Second round ===
Home team (division)	Score	Away team (division)
Abbey Hey (PD)	2–0	Maine Road (PD)
A.F.C. Liverpool (PD)	3–2	Bacup & Rossendale Borough (PD)
Ashton Athletic (PD)	0–3	Atherton Collieries (FD)
Ashton Town (FD)	3–3 (a.e.t.) (90min: 3–3) (4–5 p)	West Didsbury & Chorlton (PD)
Barnoldswick Town (PD)	2–3	1874 Northwich (PD)
Cammell Laird 1907 (FD)	1–0	Runcorn Linnets (PD)
Congleton Town (PD)	1–4	Runcorn Town (PD)
Daisy Hill (FD)	2–3	Alsager Town (PD)
Glossop North End (PD)	1–1 (a.e.t.) (90min: 1–1) (4–2 p)	A.F.C. Blackpool (PD)
Hanley Town (FD)	1–1 (a.e.t.) (90min: 1–1) (3–5 p)	Rochdale Town (FD)
Nelson (PD)	1–3	Squires Gate (PD)
Oldham Boro (FD)	0–1	Bootle (PD)
Silsden (PD)	0–1	Colne (PD)
Stockport Sports (PD)	x–W (Note: No information about result or adjudication of this tie, AFC Darwen played in the next round)	AFC Darwen (FD)
Widnes (FD)	4–4 (a.e.t.) (90min: 4–4) (4–3 p)	St Helens Town (PD)
Winsford United (PD)	2–1	Irlam (FD)

=== Third round ===
Home team (division)	Score	Away team (division)
1874 Northwich (PD)	2–3 (Note: Match played at Colne following postponement at Northwich)	Colne (PD)
Abbey Hey (PD)	2–4	Atherton Collieries (FD)
Alsager Town (PD)	x–W (Note: Alsager Town won 2–1 but were eliminated for fielding an ineligible player.)	A.F.C. Liverpool (PD)
Bootle (PD)	2–1 (a.e.t.) (90min: 1–1)	AFC Darwen (FD)
Glossop North End (PD)	8–0	Widnes (FD)
Runcorn Town (PD)	W–x (Note: Cammell Laird 1907 won 2–0 but were eliminated for fielding an ineligible player.)	Cammell Laird 1907 (FD)
Squires Gate (PD)	1–1 (a.e.t.) (90min: 1–1) (6–5 p)	Winsford United (PD)
West Didsbury & Chorlton (PD)	2–0	Rochdale Town (FD)

=== Quarter-finals ===
Home team (division)	Score	Away team (division)
A.F.C. Liverpool	0–2 (a.e.t.) (90min: 0–0)	Runcorn Town (PD)
Colne (PD)	0–2	Atherton Collieries (FD)
Glossop North End (PD)	3–0	Squires Gate (PD)
West Didsbury & Chorlton (PD)	0–3	Bootle (PD)

=== Semi-finals ===
Home team (division)	Score	Away team (division)
Runcorn Town (PD)	0–1	Atherton Collieries (FD)
Glossop North End (PD)	2–1	Bootle (PD)

=== Final ===
Team (division)	Score	Team (division)
Played at Curzon Ashton F.C., Tameside Stadium
Atherton Collieries (FD)	0–2	Glossop North End (PD)

source: "League Challenge Cup: 2014/2015 Season". nwcfl.com.

== First Division Trophy ==
The 2014–15 First Division Trophy (known as the Reusch First Division Cup for sponsorship reasons) was a knockout competition for the 19 First Division clubs only. The final, held at Bootle F.C., was won 3–1 by AFC Darwen who defeated Atherton Collieries who were thus denied a First Division league and cup double.

For the preliminary and first rounds the clubs were divided into north and south sections.

=== Preliminary round ===
Six clubs (4 in the North Section and 2 in the South Section) were drawn into preliminary round ties; the remaining 13 clubs received byes to the first round.

Home team	Score	Away team
North Section
AFC Darwen	4–3	Wigan Robin Park
Ashton Town	3–1	Chadderton
South Section
Eccleshall	0–3	Northwich Flixton Villa

=== First round ===
Home team	Score	Away team
North Section
Atherton Collieries	4–2 (a.e.t.) (90min: 2–2)	Atherton Laburnum Rovers
Holker Old Boys	1–2	AFC Darwen
Daisy Hill	0–3	Ashton Town
Oldham Boro	3–2	Rochdale Town
South Section
Cheadle Town	1–1 (a.e.t.) (90min: 1–1) (0–3 p)	Hanley Town
Irlam	0–1	Litherland REMYCA
Northwich Flixton Villa	4–2	Cammell Laird 1907
Widnes	1–2	Barnton

=== Quarter-finals ===
Home team	Score	Away team
Ashton Town	1–0	Oldham Boro
Barnton	0–2	Atherton Collieries
AFC Darwen	4–1 (Note: Match played at Hanley following postponement at Darwen)	Hanley Town
Northwich Flixton Villa	0–1	Litherland REMYCA

=== Semi-finals ===
Home team	Score	Away team
AFC Darwen	5–4 (a.e.t.) (90min: 3–3)	Ashton Town
Atherton Collieries	4–0	Litherland REMYCA

=== Final ===
Team	Score	Team
Played at Bootle F.C., Delta Taxi Stadium
AFC Darwen	3–1	Atherton Collieries

source: "First Division Trophy: 2014/2015 Season". nwcfl.com.
