= 2017–18 North West Counties Football League =

The 2017–18 North West Counties Football League season (known as the Hallmark Security League for sponsorship reasons) was the 36th in the history of the North West Counties Football League, a football competition in England.

The league comprised two divisions, the Premier Division and the First Division (at levels 9 and 10 of the English football league system, Steps 5 and 6 of the National League System respectively) – this was the final season the league operated a single Step 6 First Division, from next season 2 first divisions, designated North and South were in existence. Additionally there were two cup competitions: the League Challenge Cup (known as the Macron Challenge Cup for sponsorship reasons), a knockout competition open to all the league's clubs; and the First Division Trophy (known as the LWC Drinks First Division Cup for sponsorship reasons), a knockout trophy competition for First Division clubs only.

== Premier Division ==
North West Counties Football League Premier Division
- Season: 2017–18
- Teams: 23
- Champions: Runcorn Linnets
- Promoted: Runcorn Linnets; Widnes
- Relegated: AFC Liverpool; Maine Road; Barnton; AFC Darwen
- Matches: 506
- Goals: 1,990 (3.93 per match)
- Average attendance: 156

At the end of the previous season the following four clubs left the division:

- Atherton Collieries, promoted to Northern Premier League Division One North
- Cammell Laird 1907, relegated to the First Division
- Nelson, relegated to the First Division
- New Mills, relegated to the First Division

The 2017–18 Premier Division club allocations from the FA Leagues Committee (subject to appeal) were announced on 26 May 2017 and included the provisional placement of Northwich Victoria – the club had been relegated from Step 4 but was a new entity having recently been reconstituted under the ownership of its supporters association. Following a vote of acceptance of Northwich Victoria the constitution was ratified by the league at its AGM on 17 June. The division comprised 23 clubs, 18 remaining from the previous season plus 5 additions:

- Burscough, relegated from Northern Premier League Division One North
- Charnock Richard, promoted as runners-up from the First Division
- City of Liverpool, promoted as First Division promotion play-off winners
- Northwich Victoria, relegated from Northern Premier League First Division South
- Widnes, promoted as champions from the First Division

At the end of the season the champions Runcorn Linnets and runners-up Widnes (with their second successive promotion) were promoted to the Northern Premier League Division One West. Widnes were beneficiaries of a National League System restructure which saw fourteen Step 5 clubs promoted (initially only twelve of the fourteen Step 5 runners-up were to be promoted however, owing to resignations and mergers in the leagues above they were all promoted). To reduce the division to twenty clubs for the next season four clubs were relegated to the two new regional First Division leagues: AFC Darwen and AFC Liverpool to the First Division North, and Barnton and Maine Road to the First Division South. Barnton set a new league record for goals conceded over a season with 171 from 44 matches exceeding the previous high set by Stone Dominoes – 166 from 42 matches in the 2012–13 Premier Division. For the third successive season the average goals scored per divisional match increased to a new high for the Premier Division (formerly Division One) of 3.93 goals per match (exceeding the 3.76 of the 2016–17 season).

=== League table ===
Pos	Team	Pld	W	D	L	GF	GA	GD	Pts	Season End Notes
1	Runcorn Linnets (C, P)	44	31	7	6	122	36	+86	100	Promoted to Northern Premier; League Division One West
2	Widnes (P)	44	30	6	8	102	52	+50	96	Promoted to Northern Premier; League Division One West (Note: Promoted as one of fourteen Step 5 runners-up per National League System restructuring (originally only 12 of the 14 were to be promoted however, owing to resignations and mergers all 14 were promoted))
3	Runcorn Town	44	29	6	9	107	65	+42	93	
4	City of Liverpool	44	25	9	10	115	58	+57	84	
5	Bootle	44	25	8	11	122	61	+61	83	
6	Charnock Richard	44	24	7	13	103	72	+31	79	
7	1874 Northwich	44	24	7	13	85	56	+29	79	
8	Hanley Town	44	23	7	14	94	59	+35	76	
9	Barnoldswick Town	44	22	5	17	102	78	+24	71	
10	West Didsbury & Chorlton	44	21	4	19	99	120	−21	67	
11	Squires Gate	44	19	7	18	79	94	−15	64	
12	Ashton Athletic	44	19	5	20	86	69	+17	62	
13	Irlam	44	18	5	21	66	80	−14	59	
14	Winsford United	44	16	10	18	77	87	−10	58	
15	Congleton Town	44	16	8	20	83	85	−2	56	
16	Northwich Victoria	44	17	5	22	77	93	−16	56	
17	Padiham	44	16	5	23	85	96	−11	53	
18	Burscough	44	15	5	24	82	103	−21	50	
19	Abbey Hey	44	13	6	25	65	84	−19	45	
20	AFC Liverpool (R)	44	12	6	26	77	94	−17	42	Relegated to First Division North
21	Maine Road (R)	44	11	4	29	59	117	−58	37	Relegated to First Division South
22	Barnton (R)	44	4	7	33	61	171	−110	19	Relegated to First Division South
23	AFC Darwen (R)	44	3	7	34	42	160	−118	16	Relegated to First Division North

Source: "Final Tables, Season 2017/18". nwcfl.com., "North West Counties League - North West Counties League Premier Division: 2017 – 18: League Table". nonleaguematters.co.uk.
Rules for classification: 1) Points; 2) Goal difference; 3) Number of goals scored; 4) Number of matches won; 5) Head-to-head results
(C) Champions; (P) Promoted; (R) Relegated

=== Results ===
Home \ Away	18N	ABH	ADR	ALV	ASH	BWT	BNT	BTL	BUR	CHR	CoL	CON	HAN	IRL	MNR	NWV	PAD	RNL	RNT	SQG	WDC	WID	WIN
1874 Northwich		1–1	5–0	4–1	1–2	3–0	3–3	1–2	2–1	2–1	1–1	2–2	2–0	1–2	5–0	2–1	2–0	2–4	2–1	3–1	1–0	1–2	1–0
Abbey Hey	4–2		1–1	3–3	0–2	0–2	7–1	0–1	4–2	1–2	0–0	2–3	2–3	1–2	0–4	1–2	3–0	0–4	1–3	1–3	1–2	0–3	1–2
AFC Darwen	0–3	1–3		2–0	0–4	0–4	1–3	4–4	0–0	1–4	0–6	3–3	2–5	0–4	1–3	0–5	0–1	0–1	2–2	0–1	3–3	2–3	0–0
AFC Liverpool	3–0	3–1	4–2		1–3	3–4	5–0	2–1	1–2	1–2	0–5	0–2	2–0	0–1	1–2	2–4	1–3	1–2	1–2	0–0	3–2	2–4	4–0
Ashton Athletic	0–2	3–0	6–0	1–0		3–2	3–3	0–1	2–4	5–0	1–2	4–2	0–5	0–2	0–1	5–1	2–0	0–3	3–1	0–2	7–1	0–1	0–2
Barnoldswick T	4–0	3–1	0–1	3–2	1–3		5–0	1–2	5–2	0–4	1–3	4–2	1–3	3–0	2–4	1–1	5–1	1–4	0–1	5–0	4–1	6–1	3–2
Barnton	2–3	0–4	2–0	1–0	2–2	2–3		1–9	1–2	3–5	0–8	1–1	1–5	1–3	3–3	0–4	2–3	1–3	1–4	0–7	2–4	2–2	0–4
Bootle	0–1	2–0	10–0	3–3	4–3	2–3	5–0		1–2	0–0	0–4	5–1	3–4	3–3	4–1	5–0	4–1	0–0	3–3	1–0	3–3	5–2	3–0
Burscough	0–1	3–2	1–0	2–3	1–4	4–1	4–2	1–1		1–1	1–2	2–2	2–1	1–4	2–1	2–1	1–5	0–1	2–5	3–2	4–5	0–1	1–6
Charnock Richard	4–2	0–1	9–1	2–2	1–0	3–4	4–1	3–1	5–2		1–4	2–0	3–0	1–0	4–1	3–2	4–1	0–2	1–1	5–2	1–2	1–4	1–1
City of Liverpool	2–0	2–0	8–0	1–1	2–1	4–4	4–2	0–2	3–2	2–0		2–4	3–0	5–0	4–0	2–1	4–3	1–5	0–0	0–1	6–1	1–4	3–1
Congleton Town	1–4	3–1	6–2	3–3	0–2	1–1	5–1	3–4	4–2	1–1	1–2		3–1	3–0	2–1	1–1	2–0	0–2	0–0	0–1	0–3	0–1	4–1
Hanley Town	1–1	4–0	1–0	1–0	1–0	2–2	5–1	2–1	2–0	1–3	2–0	0–2		5–0	3–0	3–0	3–2	1–1	1–2	4–0	6–2	1–1	1–1
Irlam	0–3	1–2	3–5	0–2	3–1	1–1	4–0	0–3	2–1	0–2	1–1	0–2	0–0		2–1	0–2	0–4	1–0	2–3	4–0	3–0	1–3	1–5
Maine Road	2–3	1–3	3–2	0–1	0–3	0–3	3–1	0–4	2–3	1–3	0–5	2–1	2–8	2–0		2–1	1–3	0–5	2–5	1–1	2–1	0–2	0–1
Northwich Victoria	0–2	0–2	5–0	3–1	0–2	3–1	5–2	2–3	1–1	0–2	3–2	3–2	3–2	1–4	1–0		1–2	3–0	1–3	1–1	1–2	2–2	0–4
Padiham	0–3	1–2	5–1	5–4	0–0	1–2	5–3	0–2	3–2	2–1	2–0	3–4	1–2	0–1	1–1	2–4		1–1	4–0	4–2	6–1	3–3	1–2
Runcorn Linnets	2–1	2–2	5–1	5–2	2–0	1–1	4–0	2–0	3–0	6–2	1–1	3–1	2–0	1–1	3–0	4–2	6–1		0–1	5–0	7–0	0–2	5–0
Runcorn Town	2–1	1–0	10–3	1–0	3–1	3–2	5–0	2–0	3–2	0–2	2–2	5–2	1–0	2–0	4–3	6–1	4–0	0–5		1–2	3–2	1–2	1–2
Squires Gate	0–3	3–2	4–0	5–4	3–1	1–3	6–4	0–5	0–6	3–1	3–2	3–1	1–0	2–1	2–2	5–0	2–2	0–5	1–2		1–2	1–2	2–2
W Didsbury & Ch.	2–1	2–2	4–1	1–2	4–2	0–2	1–4	0–4	4–3	5–3	4–3	2–1	3–3	3–5	4–3	1–2	3–1	4–0	2–4	4–2		3–1	3–2
Widnes	2–2	0–1	4–0	2–0	2–2	2–0	7–1	3–2	3–0	0–3	0–1	2–1	3–0	3–1	5–1	4–0	3–1	2–1	2–0	0–1	4–0		3–1
Winsford United	1–1	1–2	2–0	4–3	3–3	1–0	1–1	0–4	1–5	3–3	2–2	2–1	0–2	1–3	5–1	2–3	2–1	0–4	2–4	2–2	1–3	2–1	

Source: "Premier Division Results 2017/18". nwcfl.com.
Legend: Blue = home team win; Yellow = draw; Red = away team win.

=== Stadia and locations ===
Locations of the 2017–18 North West Counties Football League Premier Division teams

Team	Stadium	Capacity
Widnes	Select Security Stadium (groundshare with Widnes Vikings Rugby League Club)	13,350
AFC Darwen	The Anchor Ground	4,000
AFC Liverpool	Marine Travel Arena, Crosby (groundshare with Marine)	3,185
Burscough	Victoria Park	3,054
1874 Northwich *	Barton Stadium (groundshare with Winsford United)	3,000
Winsford United	Barton Stadium	3,000
Bootle	Delta Taxis Stadium	2,500
City of Liverpool	Delta Taxis Stadium (groundshare with Bootle)	2,500
Maine Road	Brantingham Road, Chorlton	2,000
Padiham	Arbories Memorial Sports Ground	1,688
Runcorn Linnets	Millbank Linnets Stadium	1,600
Runcorn Town	Pavilions Sports Complex	1,530
Congleton Town	Richborough Estates Stadium	1,450
Abbey Hey	The Abbey Stadium, Gorton	1,000
Ashton Athletic	Brockstedes Park	1,000
Irlam	Silver Street	1,000
Squires Gate	School Road	1,000
West Didsbury & Chorlton	Brookburn Road, Chorlton	1,000
Hanley Town	Abbey Lane	750
Barnoldswick Town	Silentnight Beds Stadium	
Barnton	Townfield	
Charnock Richard	Mossie Park	1,000
Northwich Victoria	Townfield (groundshare with Barnton)	

- Due to ground conditions and acute fixture congestion, 1874 Northwich played some home matches, notably in the latter stages of the FA Vase and the league programme, at Wincham Park, Northwich, home of Witton Albion.

== First Division ==
North West Counties Football League First Division
- Season: 2017–18
- Teams: 22
- Champions: Silsden
- Promoted: Silsden; Litherland REMYCA; Whitchurch Alport
- Matches: 462
- Goals: 1,701 (3.68 per match)
- Average attendance: 86

At the end of the previous season four clubs left the division:

- Ashton Town, relegated to the Cheshire Association Football League Premier Division.
- Charnock Richard, promoted to the Premier Division
- City of Liverpool, promoted to the Premier Division
- Widnes, promoted to the Premier Division

The 2017–18 First Division club allocations from the FA Leagues Committee (subject to appeal) were announced on 26 May 2017 and its constitution ratified at the league's AGM on 17 June 2017. The division comprised 22 clubs, 18 remaining from the previous season plus 4 additions:

- Abbey Hulton United, promoted as champions of the Staffordshire County Senior League
- Cammell Laird 1907, relegated from the Premier Division
- Nelson, relegated from the Premier Division
- New Mills, relegated from the Premier Division

At the end of the season the champions Silsden, runners-up Litherland REMYCA and promotion play-off winners Whitchurch Alport (who had been fourth in the division) were promoted to the Premier Division. The twenty clubs remaining in the division were evenly allocated to next season's newly instigated First Division North or First Division South.

=== League table ===
Pos	Team	Pld	W	D	L	GF	GA	GD	Pts	Season End Notes
1	Silsden (C, P)	42	33	4	5	110	38	+72	103	Promoted to the Premier Division
2	Litherland REMYCA (P)	42	31	6	5	117	39	+78	99	Promoted to the Premier Division
3	Prestwich Heys	42	29	4	9	124	50	+74	91	Qualified for promotion play-offs. Allocated to First Division North
4	Whitchurch Alport (O, P)	42	28	4	10	91	38	+53	88	Won the promotion play-offs, promoted to Premier Division (Note: Winner from the four clubs who competed in the promotion play-offs)
5	Sandbach United	42	27	3	12	90	57	+33	84	Qualified for promotion play-offs. Allocated to First Division South
6	Cammell Laird 1907	42	22	6	14	84	58	+26	72	Qualified for promotion play-offs. Allocated to First Division South
7	AFC Blackpool	42	21	5	16	92	78	+14	68	Allocated to First Division North
8	Alsager Town	42	19	10	13	84	71	+13	67	Allocated to First Division South
9	Holker Old Boys	42	19	8	15	72	89	−17	65	Allocated to First Division North
10	Stockport Town	42	15	8	19	81	87	−6	53	Allocated to First Division South
11	Carlisle City	42	16	5	21	71	80	−9	53	Allocated to First Division North
12	Cheadle Town	42	14	11	17	72	83	−11	53	Allocated to First Division South
13	Abbey Hulton United	42	14	8	20	56	66	−10	50	Allocated to First Division South
14	New Mills	42	14	7	21	68	95	−27	49	Allocated to First Division South
15	Eccleshall	42	13	8	21	66	105	−39	47	Allocated to First Division South
16	Chadderton	42	12	10	20	83	93	−10	46	Allocated to First Division North
17	Bacup Borough	42	14	4	24	65	95	−30	46 (Note: Bacup Borough were awarded a 3–0 win against FC Oswestry Town who failed to fulfill fixture on 5 May)	Allocated to First Division North
18	Atherton Laburnum Rovers	42	13	5	24	61	81	−20	44	Allocated to First Division North
19	FC Oswestry Town	42	11	7	24	60	101	−41	40	Allocated to First Division South
20	St Helens Town	42	8	8	26	55	98	−43	32	Allocated to First Division North
21	Nelson	42	7	10	25	50	91	−41	31	Allocated to First Division North
22	Daisy Hill	42	8	7	27	49	108	−59	31	Allocated to First Division North

Source: "Final Tables, Season 2017/18". nwcfl.com., "North West Counties League - North West Counties League Division One North: 2017 – 18: League Table". nonleaguematters.co.uk.
Rules for classification: 1) Points; 2) Goal difference; 3) Number of goals scored; 4) Number of matches won; 5) Head-to-head results
(C) Champions; (O) Play-off winners; (P) Promoted

=== Results ===
Home \ Away	ABH	ABL	ALS	ALR	BAC	CAM	CAR	CHD	CHE	DSH	ECC	OSW	HOB	LIT	NEL	NWM	PRH	SAN	SIL	STH	STK	WHI
Abbey Hulton U		4–2	2–4	1–1	4–1	0–2	1–1	1–0	3–0	2–0	2–3	3–0	0–3	1–3	0–1	3–2	0–3	1–3	1–2	3–1	3–3	0–1
AFC Blackpool	3–1		5–1	1–6	1–2	3–2	1–3	1–3	4–2	3–2	5–0	9–2	1–2	0–1	4–2	1–0	3–2	1–1	1–3	1–2	2–1	1–4
Alsager Town	2–0	4–1		1–0	3–0	3–2	0–1	2–2	1–4	1–2	2–1	2–1	5–2	0–1	2–1	2–3	2–3	1–1	0–2	1–1	2–2	0–3
Atherton Lab. R	2–1	4–3	1–2		1–3	2–1	1–4	2–3	1–2	1–3	3–4	0–1	0–2	0–3	3–2	2–5	1–3	1–4	0–0	2–0	2–0	0–3
Bacup Borough	2–0	1–2	2–5	1–2		0–1	4–1	4–3	1–5	1–1	3–0	3–0 (Note: Bacup Borough v Oswestry Town: visitors failed to fulfil fixture on 5 May, result declared a 3–0 home win)	2–5	0–3	0–3	2–1	2–0	0–3	1–6	2–3	5–2	2–1
Cammell L 1907	2–1	1–1	3–1	3–1	1–0		3–1	3–0	1–2	5–0	5–1	3–2	5–1	1–4	2–0	0–0	3–0	0–1	4–1	4–0	2–1	2–2
Carlisle City	1–2	2–3	2–3	0–1	1–1	2–3		0–4	2–2	2–1	1–0	2–1	4–1	2–1	5–0	1–2	0–3	0–1	0–1	3–0	1–4	3–1
Chadderton	2–1	1–3	3–3	1–3	5–4	0–1	5–0		2–0	4–3	1–2	0–1	2–2	4–4	4–2	1–1	2–3	1–2	0–2	4–0	2–4	1–3
Cheadle Town	1–0	2–2	1–2	2–1	4–1	3–0	1–1	2–2		0–0	3–3	1–2	1–1	0–5	0–2	0–2	2–4	3–4	2–2	0–0	1–2	1–4
Daisy Hill	1–2	1–3	1–7	1–0	1–1	3–4	1–3	2–0	1–0		1–1	1–1	0–3	0–2	2–2	2–2	2–6	1–2	0–3	3–4	0–2	0–2
Eccleshall	0–0	2–2	0–4	1–1	3–2	4–2	2–1	2–2	3–4	1–3		3–0	2–4	0–2	1–1	2–0	3–5	2–1	0–5	3–2	4–1	0–2
FC Oswestry T	2–2	1–3	1–2	0–2	2–0	3–2	3–3	1–4	2–3	5–0	4–0		4–0	1–4	2–2	2–0	0–2	0–2	0–0	0–3	1–5	0–1
Holker OB	2–3	0–3	0–0	0–0	2–1	0–3	2–1	0–2	2–2	1–0	3–5	6–1		3–2	2–0	2–2	1–1	1–2	1–0	1–0	2–1	4–3
Litherland R	2–0	2–3	2–2	3–3	3–1	2–1	3–0	3–3	2–0	4–0	6–0	4–3	6–0		1–1	1–2	2–0	3–2	3–0	1–0	4–0	1–0
Nelson	0–1	2–1	3–1	1–3	0–1	1–2	0–4	0–0	1–2	2–0	2–2	0–0	1–1	0–6		1–2	0–4	2–4	1–2	1–2	0–4	2–3
New Mills	0–1	4–1	0–3	1–4	0–3	2–2	2–3	2–2	2–3	1–5	3–1	0–4	7–2	0–2	2–2		2–1	1–5	2–4	2–0	4–2	4–1
Prestwich Heys	2–2	0–1	4–0	2–1	3–1	3–0	7–2	4–2	3–1	8–0	3–0	5–2	5–0	1–1	4–1	4–0		2–1	0–4	4–0	8–1	0–1
Sandbach United	1–2	1–4	2–2	4–2	7–1	1–0	2–1	4–2	1–3	4–0	2–1	4–0	0–1	0–2	2–1	3–0	0–6		3–1	1–0	1–0	2–1
Silsden	2–1	1–0	2–1	2–0	2–1	2–1	3–2	6–0	5–2	5–1	6–0	5–1	5–0	2–1	1–0	4–0	2–2	1–0		5–2	2–0	1–2
St Helens Town	0–0 (Note: St Helens Town v Abbey Hulton: result declared a draw following investigation)	2–3	3–3	3–0	1–2	1–1	2–3	3–1	2–3	1–3	1–2	2–3	1–3	1–4	2–2	0–2	0–2	3–2	1–4		3–3	1–5
Stockport Town	3–1	0–0	0–1	2–1	1–1	1–1	0–1	4–2	2–2	2–1	3–2	7–0	1–3	2–6	2–4	6–1	2–1	3–2	1–3	1–1		0–1
Whitchurch Alport	0–0	1–0	1–1	2–0	3–0	2–0	2–1	3–1	2–0	5–0	2–0	1–1	5–1	0–2	5–1	5–0	0–1	0–2	0–1	5–1	3–0	

Source: "First Division Results 2017/18". nwcfl.com.
Legend: Blue = home team win; Yellow = draw; Red = away team win.

=== Promotion play-offs ===
The 2017–18 First Division promotion play-offs contested by the clubs that finished third to sixth in the league table were won by Whitchurch Alport who had been fourth-placed in the division.

Semi-finals
3	Prestwich Heys	1
6	Cammell Laird 1907	4
4	Whitchurch Alport	1
5	Sandbach United	0

Final
6	Cammell Laird 1907	1
4	Whitchurch Alport	2

Source="First Division Play-Off Results 2017/18". nwcfl.com.

==== Semi-finals ====
12 May 2018	Prestwich Heys	1–4	Cammell Laird 1907	Prestwich
	Belcher 25'		Mitchell 34'; Malkin 70'; Carlin 84'; Cross 87'	Stadium: Adie Moran Park; Attendance: 294

12 May 2018	Whitchurch Alport	1–0	Sandbach United	Whitchurch
	Cuff 76'			Stadium: Yockings Park; Attendance: 502

==== Final ====
17 May 2018	Whitchurch Alport	2–1	Cammell Laird 1907	Whitchurch
	Howell 6'; Everall 10'	Report	Macinnes 90'	Stadium: Yockings Park; Attendance: 733

=== Stadia and locations ===
Locations of the 2017–18 North West Counties Football League First Division teams

Team	Stadium	Capacity
Carlisle City	Gillford Park Stadium	4,000
Atherton Laburnum Rovers	Crilly Park	3,000
Bacup Borough	West View	3,000
Holker Old Boys	Rakesmoor Lane Barrow-in-Furness	2,500
Stockport Town	Stockport Sports Village	2,384
FC Oswestry Town	Park Hall Stadium	2,034
Cammell Laird 1907	North West Construction Stadium, Birkenhead	2,000
Cheadle Town	Park Road Stadium	2,000
Daisy Hill	New Sirs Westhoughton	2,000
Eccleshall	Pershall Park	2,000
Nelson	Victoria Park	2,000
AFC Blackpool	The Mechanics	1,500
Alsager Town	Wood Park Stadium	1,500
Chadderton	MCA Stadium	1,500
Silsden	Keighley Road Stadium	1,500
New Mills	Church Lane	1,400
Abbey Hulton United	Birches Head Road	
Litherland REMYCA	Litherland Sports Park	
Prestwich Heys	Adie Moran Park	
Sandbach United	Sandbach Community Football Centre	
St Helens Town	Ruskin Drive Sportsground	
Whitchurch Alport	Yockings Park	

== League Challenge Cup ==
The 2017–18 League Challenge Cup (known as the Macron Challenge Cup for sponsorship reasons) was a knockout competition open to all the league's 45 clubs. The final, played at Fleetwood Town F.C. contested by Premier Division clubs, was won 2–1 by Widnes who defeated Burscough.

=== First round ===
For the first three rounds of the competition the clubs were divided into North and South Sections. The first round comprised thirteen ties, six in the North section and seven in the South section.

(Appended to club names in the results listings below: '(PD)'=Premier Division club; '(FD)'=First Division club)

Home team (division)	Score	Away team (division)
North Section
AFC Blackpool (FD)	0–0 (2–3 p)	Nelson (FD)
AFC Darwen (PD)	1–0	City of Liverpool (PD)
Ashton Athletic (PD)	6–3	Daisy Hill (FD)
Atherton Laburnum Rovers (FD)	0–4	Carlisle City (FD)
Prestwich Heys (FD)	4–0	St. Helens Town (FD)
Silsden (FD)	0–3	Burscough (PD)
South Section
Cammell Laird 1907 (FD)	2–1	Congleton Town (PD)
FC Oswestry Town (FD)	2–1	Chadderton (FD)
Runcorn Town (PD)	3–3 (3–4 p)	Alsager Town (FD)
Sandbach United (FD)	2–3	Irlam (PD)
Stockport Town (FD)	7–1	Maine Road (PD)
Whitchurch Alport (FD)	1–1 (4–5 p)	Northwich Victoria (PD)
Winsford United (PD)	4–3	Barnton (PD)
The remaining 19 clubs received byes to the second round

=== Second round ===
Home team (division)	Score	Away team (division)
North Section
AFC Darwen (PD)	W–x (Note: Match venue moved to Padiham F.C. following two postponements) (Note: Padiham disqualified for fielding ineligible player (match result 1-2))	Padiham (PD)
Bacup Borough (FD)	1–6 (Note: Match venue moved to Ashton Athletic F.C. following two postponements)	Ashton Athletic (PD)
Barnoldswick Town (PD)	0–4	Charnock Richard (PD)
Bootle (PD)	4–2	Litherland REMYCA (FD)
Holker Old Boys (FD)	2–7 (Note: Match venue moved to A.F.C. Liverpool following two postponements)	AFC Liverpool (PD)
Nelson (FD)	x–W (Note: Match venue moved to Prestwich Heys A.F.C. following two postponements) (Note: Nelson disqualified for fielding ineligible player (match result 1–1 (3–0 p)))	Prestwich Heys (FD)
Squires Gate (PD)	1–2	Burscough (PD)
Widnes (PD)	1–1 (3–1 p)	Carlisle City (PD)
South Section
1874 Northwich (PD)	4–1 (Note: Match venue moved to Abbey Hulton United F.C. following two postponements)	Abbey Hulton United (FD)
Abbey Hey (PD)	5–3	New Mills (FD)
Cheadle Town (FD)	2–1	Alsager Town (FD)
Eccleshall (FD)	0–3	FC Oswestry Town (FD)
Hanley Town (PD)	3–5	Northwich Victoria (PD)
Irlam (PD)	1–1 (Note: Match venue moved to Cammell Laird 1907 F.C. following two postponements) (5–4 p)	Cammell Laird 1907 (FD)
Stockport Town (FD)	2–1	Runcorn Linnets (PD)
Winsford United (PD)	5–1	West Didsbury & Chorlton (PD)

=== Third round ===
Home team (division)	Score	Away team (division)
North Section
Bootle (PD)	1–3	Charnock Richard (PD)
Burscough (PD)	1–1 (8–7 p)	Prestwich Heys (FD)
AFC Liverpool (PD)	1–4	Ashton Athletic (PD)
Widnes (PD)	2–1	AFC Darwen (PD)
South Section
Cheadle Town (FD)	1–1 (3–4 p)	Northwich Victoria (PD)
Irlam (PD)	3–1	FC Oswestry Town (FD)
Stockport Town (FD)	2–1	Abbey Hey (PD)
Winsford United (PD)	3–1	1874 Northwich (PD)

=== Quarter-finals ===
From this round the division of clubs into two geographic sections was discontinued.

Home team (division)	Score	Away team (division)
Ashton Athletic (PD)	0–2	Widnes (PD)
Burscough (PD)	2–1	Northwich Victoria (PD)
Stockport Town (FD)	0–4	Irlam (PD)
Winsford United (PD)	1–1 (4–2 p)	Charnock Richard (PD)

=== Semi–Finals ===
The semi-finals were decided on aggregate score from two legs played

Tie	Home team (division)	Score	Away team (division)
1	Irlam (PD)	0–0	Burscough (PD)
1	Burscough (PD)	3–0	Irlam (PD)
1	Burscough won 3–0 on aggregate		
2	Widnes (PD)	5–0	Winsford United (PD)
2	Winsford United (PD)	2–2	Widnes (PD)
2	Widnes won 7–2 on aggregate		

=== Final ===
Team (division)	Score	Team (division)
Played 15 May 2018 at Fleetwood Town F.C., Highbury Stadium
Burscough (PD)	1–2	Widnes (PD)

source: "League Challenge Cup: 2017/18 Season". nwcfl.com.

== First Division Trophy ==
The 2017–18 First Division Trophy (known as the LWC Drinks First Division Cup for sponsorship reasons) was a knockout competition for the 22 First Division clubs only. The final, played at Runcorn Linnets F.C., was won 2–1 by Prestwich Heys who defeated Cammell Laird 1907.

=== First round ===
The competition was split into North and South groups up and including the quarter-finals. Twelve clubs (six from each group) were drawn into first round matches, the remaining 10 clubs received byes to the second round.

Home team	Score	Away team
North Section
Atherton Laburnum Rovers	2–1 (Note: Match venue moved to Carlisle City F.C. following two postponements)	Carlisle City
Daisy Hill	0–0 (5–4 p)	Litherland REMYCA
Holker Old Boys	1–2	St. Helens Town
South Section
Chadderton	0–1	Cheadle Town
New Mills	2–2 (3–4 p)	Alsager Town
Sandbach United	6–1	FC Oswestry Town
The remaining ten clubs received byes to the second round

=== Second round ===
Home team	Score	Away team
North Section
AFC Blackpool	4–0	Silsden
Nelson	0–1	Atherton Laburnum Rovers
Prestwich Heys	3–1	Bacup Borough
St. Helens Town	3–3 (2–4 p)	Daisy Hill
South Section
Cammell Laird 1907	2–0	Stockport Town
Cheadle Town	3–1	Abbey Hulton United
Sandbach United	4–2	Eccleshall
Whitchurch Alport	0–3	Alsager Town

=== Quarter-finals ===
Home team	Score	Away team
North Section
Daisy Hill	W–x (Note: Atherton LR disqualified for fielding an ineligible player (match result 0–1))	Atherton Laburnum Rovers
Prestwich Heys	3–1	AFC Blackpool
South Section
Alsager Town	0–4	Cammell Laird 1907
Sandbach United	4–1	Cheadle Town

=== Semi–Finals ===
The semi-finals were decided on aggregate score from two legs played

Tie	Home team	Score	Away team
1	Cammell Laird 1907	3–1	Daisy Hill
1	Daisy Hill	1–2	Cammell Laird 1907
1	Cammell Laird 1907 won 5–2 on aggregate		
2	Sandbach United	1–2	Prestwich Heys
2	Prestwich Heys	3–2	Sandbach United
2	Prestwich Heys won 5–3 on aggregate		

=== Final ===
Team	Score	Team
Played 9 May 2018 at Runcorn Linnets F.C., Millbank Linnets Stadium
Cammell Laird 1907	1–2	Prestwich Heys

source: "First Division Trophy: 2017/18 Season". nwcfl.com.
