= Irlam F.C. =

Association football club in Greater Manchester, England

Coordinates: 53°27′26.86″N 2°24′49.68″W

Irlam
- Full name: Irlam Football Club
- Founded: 1969
- Ground: Silver Street, Irlam
- Chairman: Lee Hilton
- Manager: John Main
- League: North West Counties League Premier Division
- 2024–25: North West Counties League Premier Division, 7th of 24
Home colours	Away colours

Irlam Football Club is a football club based in Irlam, within the city of Salford, Greater Manchester, England. They are currently members of the North West Counties League Premier Division and play at Silver Street.

== History ==
The club was established in October 1969 as Mitchell Shackleton Football Club by workers at the Mitchell, Shackleton and Company engineering firm in Patricroft. They joined the Eccles & District Amateur Football League the following year, before transferring to the Manchester Amateur League in 1972. They were Division Three champions in 1973–74 and won the Division Two title the following season. League restructuring saw them placed in the Industrial 'B' Division. They were runners-up in 1979–80 and went on to finish second in the Industrial 'A' Division in 1983–84, also winning the Gosling Cup.

Mitchell Shackleton were Industrial 'A' Division runners-up again in 1985–86, before switching to Division One of the Manchester League in 1989. After finishing the 1990–91 season as Division One runners-up, they were promoted to the Premier Division. The club were subsequently Premier Division runners-up in 1994–95. In 2001 the club was renamed Irlam Mitchell Shackleton, and the 2002–03 season saw them win the Premier Division title. They won the Manchester Challenge Cup in 2003–04, and were Premier Division runners-up in 2004–05. After winning the Challenge Cup again in 2005–06, the club adopted its current name.

Despite only finishing eighth in 2007–08, Irlam were promoted to Division One of the North West Counties League. The club won the Manchester Charter Standard Cup in 2009–10, defeating Wythenshawe Town 3–2 in the final. They were Division One runners-up in 2015–16, earning promotion to the Premier Division.

=== Season-by-season ===
Season	League	Position	Notes
1989–90	Manchester League Division One	6/18	
1990–91	Manchester League Division One	2/19	Promoted
1991–92	Manchester League Premier Division	7/18	
1992–93	Manchester League Premier Division	9/18	
1993–94	Manchester League Premier Division	14/18	
1994–95	Manchester League Premier Division	2/16	
1995–96	Manchester League Premier Division	8/16	
1996–97	Manchester League Premier Division	10/16	
1997–98	Manchester League Premier Division	14/16	
1998–99	Manchester League Premier Division	5/15	
1999–2000	Manchester League Premier Division	3/16	
2000–01	Manchester League Premier Division	4/15	
2001–02	Manchester League Premier Division	8/15	
2002–03	Manchester League Premier Division	1/16	Champions
2003–04	Manchester League Premier Division	7/16	
2004–05	Manchester League Premier Division	2/15	
2005–06	Manchester League Premier Division	15/17	
2006–07	Manchester League Premier Division	5/19	
2007–08	Manchester League Premier Division	8/19	Promoted
2008–09	North West Counties League Division One	8/18	
2009–10	North West Counties League Division One	10/17	
2010–11	North West Counties League Division One	9/18	
2011–12	North West Counties League Division One	10/18	
2012–13	North West Counties League Division One	14/18	
2013–14	North West Counties League Division One	10/19	
2014–15	North West Counties League Division One	14/19	
2015–16	North West Counties League Division One	2/19	Promoted
2016–17	North West Counties League Premier Division	8/19	
2017–18	North West Counties League Premier Division	13/23	
2018–19	North West Counties League Premier Division	13/20	
2019–20	North West Counties League Premier Division	8/20	Season abandoned

== Ground ==
The club was initially based at the Oddfellows Arms in Patricroft, but moved to St Michaels Community Centre in Peel Green in 1973. In 2002 the club learnt that their Salteye Park was to be requisitioned to build Salford Reds' new stadium. As a result, they moved to Silver Street in Irlam, which had formerly been the home ground of Irlam Town. The ground was opened with a match against the Manchester United youth team.

== Honours ==
- Manchester League
  - Premier Division champions 2002–03
- Manchester Amateur League
  - Division Two champions 1974–75
  - Division Three champions 1973–74
  - Gosling Cup winners 1983–84
- Manchester FA Challenge Cup
  - Winners 2005–04, 2005–06
  - Charter Standard Cup winners 2009–10

== Records ==
- Best FA Cup performance: Second qualifying round, 2018–19, 2019–20
- Best FA Vase performance: Fifth round, 2018–19
- Record attendance: 950 vs Manchester United XI, August 2003

== See also ==
- Irlam F.C. players
