= Northwich Manchester Villa F.C. =

Northwich Manchester Villa
- Full name: Northwich Manchester Villa Football Club
- Founded: 2005
- Dissolved: 2016
- Ground: Manchester Regional Arena, Manchester
- Capacity: 6,500
- 2015–16: North West Counties League Division One, 15th (resigned)
Home colours	Away colours

Northwich Manchester Villa Football Club was an English association football club based in Manchester, Greater Manchester, England. The team last competed in the North West Counties Football League Division One in season 2015–16, having been admitted to that league via a successful application. The team had three previous names, Woodley, Northwich Villa, and Northwich Flixton Villa, and played in the Cheshire Football League between 2005 and 2011. The club folded in 2016.

== History ==
The team was formed in 2005 when a team called Woodley was renamed Northwich Villa when links were made with Northwich Victoria for the team to act as a feeder team.

The club entered the Cheshire Football League Division Two in 2005–06 and finished as runners up in the inaugural season. Consequently, the team was promoted to Division One, which the team won in 2008–09. The team was runner-up the following year.

The team finished 9th in the 2010–11 season and had a successful application to join the North West Counties Football League Division One.

After two seasons in the North West Counties League and a relocation to Flixton, the club adopted the name of Northwich Flixton Villa in 2013.

The club finished the 2013–14 season in one of the two relegation places, but was not relegated due to a surplus of spaces at level 10. In the summer of 2015, the club was renamed again, to Northwich Manchester Villa when it relocated to the Manchester Regional Arena. The club later folded in 2016.

== Honours ==
- Cheshire Football League Division One
  - Champions 2008–09
  - Runners-up 2009–10
- Cheshire Football League Division Two
  - Runners-up 2005–06
