= Barnton F.C. =

Association football club in England

Coordinates: 53.2746°N 2.5465°W

Barnton
- Full name: Barnton Football Club
- Nickname: The Villagers
- Founded: 1946
- Ground: Townfield, Barnton
- Chairman: Dave Bryning
- Manager: Lewis Wood
- League: North West Counties League Division One South
- 2025–26: North West Counties League Division One South, 10th of 18
- Website: www.barntonfc.co.uk
Home colours	Away colours

Barnton Football Club is a football club in the village of Barnton, near Northwich, in Cheshire. They are currently members of the North West Counties League Division One South and play at Townfield Lane, known as the Creative Hut Stadium.

== History ==
The club was established in 1946, and in 1948 they were founder members of the Mid-Cheshire League. In their first season in the league, the club won the Cheshire Amateur Cup. They won the Amateur Cup again in 1968–69. The league gained a second division title in 1975 which secured the club a place in Division One. They won the league for the first time in 1979–80, also winning the league's Challenge Cup. After retaining the Challenge Cup the following season, the club won the league and Challenge Cup double again in 1982–83. After winning the Challenge Cup and Mid-Cheshire Senior Cup in 1983–84, they were league champions for a third time in 1988–89. The following season saw the club win the Challenge Cup again, and they retained the trophy in 1990–91 and 1991–92, before winning it again in 1994–95.

Their fourth league title in 1996–97 was the first of seven consecutive league titles, a period during which the club also won the Challenge Cup in 1997–98, 1989–99, 1999–2000 and 2000–01 and the Cheshire Amateur Cup in 2001–02. After finishing only third in 2003–04 (but winning the Challenge Cup and the Amateur Cup), Barton won the league again in 2004–05. The league was renamed the Cheshire League in 2007, and the club were relegated to Division Two after finishing bottom of Division One in 2008–09. After four seasons in Division Two, they won the title in 2012–13, earning promotion back to Division One. The following season saw them finish fifth, high enough to be promoted to Division One of the North West Counties League.

In 2015–16 Barton finished third in Division One, qualifying for the promotion play-offs; after beating Cheadle Town 4–1 in the semi-finals, they beat Bacup Borough 2–0 in the final in front of a record crowd of 554, earning promotion to the Premier Division. The season also saw them win the Division One Trophy, beating Hanley Town 5–4 on penalties after a 1–1 draw.

The 2017–18 season saw Barnton finish second-from-bottom of the Premier Division, resulting in relegation back to Division One.

== Honours ==
- North West Counties League
  - Division One Trophy winners 2015–16
- Cheshire League
  - Champions 1979–80, 1982–83, 1988–89, 1996–97, 1997–98, 1998–99, 1999–2000, 2000–01, 2001–02, 2002–03, 2004–05
  - Division Two champions 2012–13
  - Challenge Cup winners 1979–80, 1980–81, 1981–82, 1982–83, 1983–84, 1989–90, 1990–91, 1991–92, 1994–95, 1997–98, 1998–99, 1999–2000, 2000–01, 2003–04
- Cheshire Amateur Cup
  - Winners 1948–49, 1968–69, 2001–02, 2003–04
- Mid Cheshire Senior Cup
  - Winners 1983–84

== Records ==
- Best FA Cup performance: First qualifying round, 1948–49
- Best FA Vase performance: Second round, 2020–21
- Record attendance: 554 vs Bacup Borough, North West Counties League Division One play-off final, 14 May 2016

== See also ==
- Barnton F.C. players
- Barnton F.C. managers
