= Litherland REMYCA F.C. =

Association football club in England

Coordinates: 53.4794°N 2.9851°W

Litherland REMYCA
- Full name: Litherland REMYCA Football Club
- Nickname: The REMY
- Founded: 1959
- Ground: Litherland Sports Park, Litherland
- Chairman: Don Rimmer
- Manager: Steven Scott
- League: North West Counties League Premier Division
- 2024–25: North West Counties League Premier Division, 19th of 24
Home colours	Away colours

Litherland REMYCA Football Club is a football club based in Litherland, Merseyside, England. They are currently members of the North West Counties League Premier Division and play at Litherland Sports Park.

== History ==
The club was established in 1959 as St Thomas Football Club and were initially based in Seaforth. They were later renamed Bootle Church Lads Brigade, with Bootle YMCA becoming the club's base. In 1967 they became REM Social after a local working men's club started financing the club, before being renamed REMYCA United the following year, the name reflecting links with the REM social club and the Bootle YMCA. Under the new name the club joined Division Three of the I Zingari Alliance, winning it at the first attempt. After winning higher divisions in successive seasons, the club entered the I Zingari League.

The 1975–76 season saw REMYCA win the league's Challenge Cup, and the club were league champions in 1987–88. In 1990–91 they won the Lancashire Amateur Cup. The mid-1990s were a highly-successful period for the club as they won both the league title and the Challenge Cup in three successive seasons between 1993–94 and 1995–96, before winning the Challenge Cup again in 1998–99. In 2001 they joined the newly re-established Division Two of the Liverpool County Combination. The two divisions merged into one the following season, but the club withdrew from the league midway through the 2002–03 season.

REMYCA returned to the I Zingari League and were Division Two champions in 2005–06. The league then merged with the Liverpool County Combination to form the Liverpool County Premier League, with the club placed in Division Two. They won the division in the league's inaugural season and were promoted to Division One. After a third-place finish in 2009–10 the club were promoted to the Premier Division. In 2013 they were renamed Litherland REMYCA. A fifth-place finish in the Premier Division in 2013–14 was enough to earn promotion to Division One of the North West Counties League.

In 2016–17 Litherland finished third in Division One, qualifying for the promotion play-offs; after beating Sandbach United 1–0 in the semi-finals, they lost 3–0 at home to City of Liverpool in the final in front of a record crowd of 1,303. They were Division One runners-up the following season and were promoted to the Premier Division.

== Ground ==
The club played at Moss Lane until moving to Maghull High School when they joined the Premier Division of the I Zingari League. They later move to their current ground, the Litherland Sports Park athletics arena. A 50-seat stand was installed in April 2014.

== Honours ==
- Liverpool County Premier League
  - Division Two champions 2006–07
- I Zingari League
  - Champions 1987–88, 1993–94, 1994–95, 1995–96
  - Challenge Cup winners 1975–76, 1993–94, 1994–95, 1995–96, 1998–99
  - Division Two champions 2005–06
- I Zingari Alliance
  - Division Three champions 1968–69
- Lancashire Amateur Cup
  - Winners 1990–91

== Records ==
- Best FA Cup performance: First round qualifying, 2020–21
- Best FA Vase performance: First round, 2016–17, 2017–18, 2018–19
- Record attendance: 1,303 vs City of Liverpool, North West Counties League Division One play-off final, 13 May 2017

== See also ==
- Litherland REMYCA F.C. players
