= Stockport Town F.C. =

Association football club in Greater Manchester, England

Coordinates: 53.430°N 2.104°W

Stockport Town
- Full name: Stockport Town Football Club
- Nicknames: The Lions, Town
- Founded: 2014
- Ground: Stockport Sports Village, Woodley, Stockport
- Capacity: 2,384 (192 Seats)
- Owner: Mark Stott
- Chairman: Carlos Roca
- Manager: Vacant
- League: North West Counties League Premier Division
- 2025–26: North West Counties League Premier Division, 12th of 24 (resigned)
- Website: stockporttownfc.co.uk
Home colours	Away colours

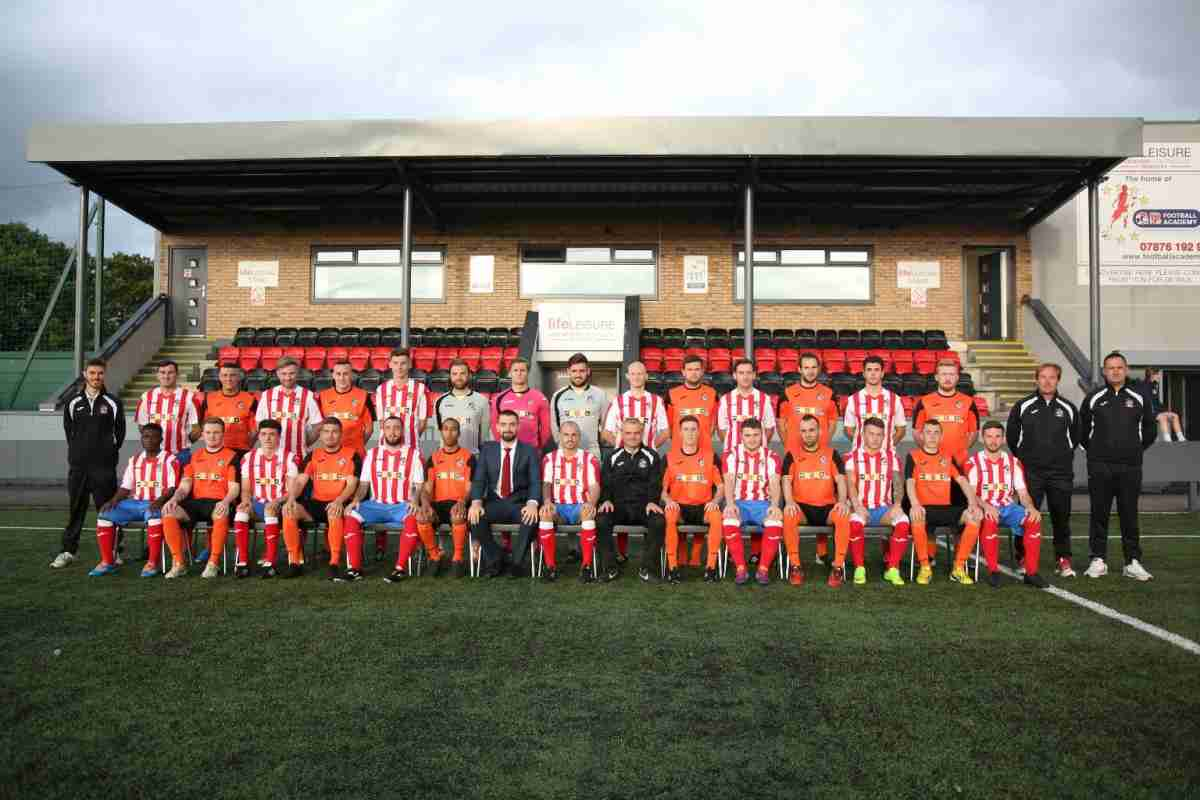
Stockport Town's league debut squad at the start of the 2015–16 season

Stockport Town Football Club is a semi-professional football club based in Woodley, a suburb of Stockport, Greater Manchester, England. They are currently members of the North West Counties League Premier Division, the ninth tier of English football, and play at Stockport Sports Village. Nicknamed "the Lions", the club was founded in 2014 and were accepted into the North West Counties Football League a year later.

== History ==
Stockport Town was founded in 2014. Based at Stockport Sports Village, the club began with ambitious aims to begin life at the tenth tier of the English football league system. Stockport Town suffered a setback in their plans after being unsuccessful in applying for the league. After positive meetings, the FA told Stockport Town they were not convinced that the club met the required standards for a new club attempting to join the North West Counties. Despite this, the club board were convinced that a year of development would only benefit the club's application chances. On 29 April 2015, three of the club's representatives travelled to Wembley to meet with the Leagues' Committee. They highlighted how the club had been successfully run over the past year, with encouraging results against some high-profile clubs from the region.

On 14 May 2015, was accepted into the North West Counties Football League Division One for the 2015–16 season.

=== Early beginnings ===
Calum Sykes was manager of the club for its first two full seasons. On 17 December 2016, Sykes announced that he was to resign, and later that same day he was announced as the manager of nearby club New Mills. On 6 January 2017, the club announced that Dave Wild, with previous experience of coaching at Northwich Victoria and Maine Road, would replace him. Wild's reign began away at FC Oswestry Town, where a rebuilt squad put a stop to consecutive defeats and earned a point in a 0–0 draw.

Wild would lose just 4 out of 18 matches in his half-season in charge of the Lions, ending with a win rate of 50%, securing a tenth-place finish having scored 92 goals throughout the season.

On 29 March 2018, it was announced by the club that Wild and his backroom staff were to depart with immediate effect, joining Division One North club Mossley with U21s boss, Jake Davies, put in interim charge alongside his assistant Tom Upton. During their 11 games at the helm Davies and Upton finished with a better win percentage of previous managers Dave Wild and Calum Sykes combined in which concluded a tough season for the Lions.

Concluding the 2017–18 season, the club appointed Alan Lord as manager for the new 2018–19 season with interim manager Jake Davies and Tom Upton taking up first team coaching roles for the upcoming season.

=== Robbie Savage signing ===
Former Wales international Robbie Savage signed for the club in November 2019. He signed because he "wants to help young players to get back into football after they have been released by a club". His last professional game had been in May 2011.

In October 2020, Macclesfield Town's stadium and all available assets were purchased by Robert Smethurst, the owner of Stockport Town, with the aim of returning professional football to Macclesfield by creating the phoenix club as Macclesfield F.C. Smethurst appointed Savage as a member of the board for the new phoenix club.

=== Resignation from NWCFL ===
On 13 May 2026, Stockport Town F.C. announced they were withdrawing from the North West Counties Football League.

== Ground ==
Stockport Town play their home matches at Stockport Sports Village, in Woodley, on a 3G Pitch (artificial turf). The ground has a capacity of 2,384 spectators which includes 192 seats. In addition to the first-team pitch, the Stockport Sports Village Campus also accommodates 16 floodlit 3G pitches which are used by the local Charter Standard football teams and members of the public. The ground was previously used by Stockport Sports before the club was liquidated in 2015.

The ground has two stands, the seated main stand located along the halfway line, which houses the club's changing rooms, bar and toilet facilities, and a terrace located on the southern end of the ground.

== Shirt sponsors and manufacturers ==
Period	Kit Manufacturer	Shirt Sponsor
2015–2016	Joma	Metro Taxis
2016–2017	Joma	Leemic
2018–	Nike	kitlocker.com

== Current squad ==
Note: Flags indicate national team as defined under FIFA eligibility rules; some limited exceptions apply. Players may hold more than one non-FIFA nationality.

No.	Pos.	Nation	Player
—	GK	MDA	Andrei Stinca
—	GK	ENG	Alex Gorst
—	DF	ENG	Connor Hancock
—	DF	ENG	Kieran O’Connell
—	DF	ENG	Tom Whitty
—	DF	ENG	Jack Taylor
—	DF	ENG	Chiek Thiam
—	DF	ENG	Tom Greenfield
—	DF	ENG	Josh Robinson
—	MF	ENG	Rourke Neil

No.	Pos.	Nation	Player
—	MF	ENG	Dahomey Raymond
—	MF	ENG	Lee Constantine
—	MF	ENG	Dale Jennings
—	MF	ENG	Reece Skelton
—	MF	ENG	James Vincent
—	FW	ENG	Liam Mottram
—	FW	ENG	Jardel Depeiaza
—	FW	ENG	Jesrun Uchebegulam
—	FW	ENG	Alex King
—	FW	ENG	Rhys Turner
—	FW	ENG	Leon Osman

== Club officials ==
=== Board and management officials ===
Position	Staff
Chairman	(England) Rob York
Secretary	(England) Rob Clare
Director	(England) Ian Dixon Seb Rowe

=== Coaching staff and support staff ===
Position	Staff
Head of Management team	(England) Alan Lord
Manager	(England) Vacant
First-team Coach	(England) Jordan Robinson
Goalkeeping Coach	(England) Jim Nasium
Physiotherapist	(England) Tanya Audas Chris Pownall
U-21s Head Coach	(England) Oliver Bell
U-21s Assistant Manager	(England) Josh Bramely
Head of Scouting and Recruitment	(England) Christian "Bigsy" Batt

=== Managerial history ===
Dates	Name
2014–2016	(England) Calum Sykes
2016–2018	(England) Dave Wild
2018–2018	(England) Jake Davies
2018–	(England) Alan Lord

== Club records ==
- Best FA Cup performance: Extra preliminary round, 2023–24, 2024–25
- Best FA Vase performance: 1st round, 2016–17, 2024–25
- Record victory: 7–0 vs Whitchurch Alport (30 April 2016)
- Record defeat: 0–10 vs City of Liverpool (31 December 2016), 0-10 vs Stockport County (9 July 2019)
- Most goals scored in a match: 6–6 vs Eagley (6 September 2014)
- Highest home attendance: 1,240 vs Bury (1 February 2025)
