= Holker Old Boys A.F.C. =

Association football club in England

Coordinates: 54°08′33.26″N 3°13′05.21″W

Holker Old Boys
- Full name: Holker Old Boys Association Football Club
- Nicknames: Cobs, Stags
- Founded: 1936
- Ground: Rakesmoor, Barrow-in-Furness
- Chairman: Maurice Watkin
- Manager: Kevin Watkin & Dave Round
- League: North West Counties League Division One North
- 2024–25: North West Counties League Division One North, 4th of 18
| Home colours | Away colours |

Holker Old Boys Association Football Club is an amateur football club based in Barrow-in-Furness, Cumbria, England. They are currently members of the North West Counties League Division One North and play at Rakesmoor Lane.

== History ==
The club was established in 1936 as Holker Central Old Boys and was initially an under-16 team for former pupils of the Holker Central Secondary School. They joined the adult North Western League in 1939, before joining Division One of the West Lancashire League in 1967. In 1972–73 the club finished bottom of Division One and were relegated to Division Two. The club adopted its current name in 1973, and after finishing fourth in Division Two in 1975–76, they were promoted back to Division One. The club were relegated again at the end of the 1978–79 season, but returned to Division One after finishing second in Division Two in 1980–81.

In 1985–87 Holker Old Boys were Division One runners-up, and the following season they won the league for the first time. The club were runners-up again in 1987–88, and after finishing fourth in 1990–91, they moved up to Division Two of the North West Counties League. A third-place finish in 1993–94 saw the club promoted to Division One. They were relegated back to Division Two after finishing bottom of Division One in 1998–99. Division Two was subsequently renamed Division One in 2008. In 2014–15 the club finished fifth in the division, qualifying for the promotion play-offs; they went on to lose 3–1 to Hanley Town in the semi-finals.

== Ground ==
The club initially played on playing fields, before moving to Thorncliffe Road. In 1971 they relocated to Rakesmoor Lane, which had previously been used for an isolation hospital and then allotments. Floodlights were installed within two seasons of joining the North West Counties League in 1991. In 2003 a home match against F.C. United of Manchester was moved to Craven Park, the home ground of Barrow Raiders rugby league club, due to the anticipated size of the crowd; the attendance of 2,303 was a club record.

== Honours ==
- West Lancashire League
  - Division One champions 1986–87
- Lancashire Amateur Shield
  - Winners 1988–89, 1990–91

== Records ==
- Best FA Cup performance: Second qualifying round, 2004–05
- Best FA Vase performance: Fourth round, 2022–23
- Record attendance: 2,303 vs FC United, North West Counties League Division Two, 17 December 2005
- Most goals: Dave Conlin

== See also ==
- Holker Old Boys A.F.C. players
