= Whitchurch Alport F.C. =

Association football club in England

Whitchurch Alport
- Full name: Whitchurch Alport Football Club
- Nickname: Alport
- Founded: 1946; 80 years ago
- Ground: Yockings Park, Whitchurch
- Capacity: 1200
- Coordinates: 52.9724°N 2.6725°W
- Chairman: Andy Williams
- Manager: Jayson Starkey
- League: Midland League Premier Division
- 2025–26: Midland League Premier Division, 11th of 18
- Website: pitchero.com/clubs/whitchurchalportfc
Home colours

Whitchurch Alport Football Club is an English football club based in Whitchurch, Shropshire. The club participates in the Midland League Premier Division.

== History ==
The club were formed in 1946 in the football season that followed World War II, being named after Alport Farm in Alport Road, Whitchurch, which had been the home of Coley Maddocks, a local footballer who had been killed in action in the war. They joined the Shrewsbury and District League, spending two seasons in the league, winning the title in their second season. In 1948, they were briefly elected as members of the Birmingham League, before becoming founder members of the Mid-Cheshire League.

In 1974, they became the last English team to take the Welsh Amateur Cup out of Wales prior to its becoming the Welsh Intermediate Cup, defeating Cardiff College of Education 2–1 at Latham Park, Newtown.

They were admitted to the North West Counties Football League Division One from the Mercian Regional Football League in 2015.

On 24 September 2019, Alport lifted the Shropshire Senior Cup for the first time – defeating reigning champions Shrewsbury Town 3–1 in the final at New Meadow. At the end of the 2020–21 season, the club were transferred to the Premier Division of the Midland League.

== Ground ==
The club play at Yockings Park. The dressing rooms were constructed from wooden packing crates acquired from the Military Camp at Prees Heath shortly after the end of World War II.

== Records ==
- Best FA Cup performance: 1st qualifying round, 2019–20, 2022–23, 2024–25 (replay)
- Best FA Vase performance: Quarter-finals, 2021–22, 2024–25

== Honours ==
- Mid-Cheshire League
  - Winners 1969–70
  - Runners-up 1949–50, 1954–55, 1970–71, 1977–78
- Shrewsbury & District League
  - Winners 1947–48
- Welsh Amateur Cup/Welsh Intermediate Cup
  - Winners 1973–74
  - Runners-up 1958–59, 1976–77
- Shropshire County Cup
  - Winners 1969–70, 1997–98, 2008–09, 2021–22, 2022–23
  - Runners-up 1995–96
- Shropshire County FA Huddersfield Cup
  - Winners 2018–19
- Shropshire Senior Cup
  - Winners 2019

== See also ==
- Whitchurch Alport F.C. players
