= Silsden A.F.C. =

Association football club in England

Coordinates: 53.906952°N 1.943401°W

Silsden
- Full name: Silsden Association Football Club
- Nickname: The Cobbydalers
- Founded: 1904; 122 years ago
- Ground: Regal Interiors Stadium; Silsden
- Capacity: 1,500
- Chairman: Will Twigg
- Manager: Matt Cavanagh & Paul Maltby
- League: Northern Premier League Division One East
- 2025–26: Northern Premier League Division One East, 17th of 22
Home colours	Away colours

Silsden A.F.C. is a football club based in Silsden, West Yorkshire, England, and is currently a member of the Northern Premier League Division One East.

== History ==
The club was formed in 1904. In 2004–05, they reached the second round of the FA Vase.

They are one of only three teams ever to win the West Riding County Challenge FA Cup three years on the trot – 2001, 2002 and 2003 before joining the NWCFL the following season and gaining promotion at the first attempt into the Premier Division (along with Cammell Laird).

The other two teams to have won the West Riding CFA Challenge Cup three times on the trot were Storthes Hall (1998-2000) and Bradford Rovers (1939–41).

For the 2014–15 season; Silsden AFC fielded a Development Squad to compete in the Lancashire Galaxy League under manager Paul Evans.

Ryan Haigh was appointed first team manager for the 2015–16 season but resigned in February due to family commitments. He was replaced by former player James Gill.

Danny Forrest took over from James Gill in November 2016. His assistant is another ex-professional – Matty McNeil and is supported by goalkeeper coach Kevin Knappy, physio Andy Henson and fitness coach Clive Murgatroyd.

In January 2016 Silsden announced plans on their website to allow all Bradford City Season ticket holders half price admission for the remainder of the season. They have since extended this invitation to all professional clubs including local side Guiseley AFC.

For the 2017–18 season Silsden AFC entered an Under 21 team into the West Riding County FA U21 League. In that season they won the North West Counties League Division One and gained promotion to the Premier Division.

In 2022 Danny Forrest left for local Northern Premier League side Guiseley and Luke Lavery and Matt Cavanagh were appointed as joint managers with ex-defender Shaun Airey appointed onto their coaching staff.

== Current squad ==
As of 21 August 2026

Note: Flags indicate national team as defined under FIFA eligibility rules; some limited exceptions apply. Players may hold more than one non-FIFA nationality.

No.	Pos.	Nation	Player
—	GK	USA	Tommy Brown
—	DF	WAL	Jake Cassidy
—	DF	ENG	Lewis Gardner
—	DF	ENG	Danny Hunt
—	DF	ENG	Cole Hyde
—	DF	ENG	Aaron Pickles
—	DF	ENG	Jorge Sikora
—	MF	ENG	Cameron Bedford
—	MF	ENG	Cody Cromack
—	MF	ENG	Toby Jeffrey
—	MF	ENG	Christovie Kondolo

No.	Pos.	Nation	Player
—	MF	ENG	Josh McKiernon
—	MF	ENG	Will Morrissey
—	MF	GIB	Jeremy Perera
—	MF	POR	Belchior Rodrigues
—	MF	ENG	Fermin Sankoh-Fernandez
—	FW	ENG	Andy Briggs
—	FW	ENG	Luke Brooksbank
—	FW	ENG	Ethan Cummings
—	FW	ENG	Kevin Gonzalez
—	FW	ENG	Hamza Hamdosh
—	FW	ENG	Jakub Hebda

== Stadium ==
During their earlier years in the North West Counties League they played their home games at Cougar Park, home of the rugby league club Keighley Cougars. However, in early 2010 plans were put in place to upgrade their former ground in Silsden. With the help of the Football Foundation, Sports England and Asda Foundation, committee of the club, of Silsden Cricket Club and of players plus the generosity of sponsors and local businesses, their dream came true when they returned in time for the start of the 2010–11 season. Floodlights, a stand, new dugouts, coffee hut, pay-hut, walkway, perimeter fencing and barriers were all put in place to complement the newly erected £1.2 million Sports Club which houses 6 changing rooms, two referees' rooms, a physiotherapy room and a function room.

For the start of the 2012–13 season saw the name of stadium change to Angel Telecom Stadium following a five-year sponsor package with the Bradford-based telecommunications company.

For the 2016–17 season the stadium was renamed "The Cobbydale Construction Stadium" to coincide with a generous annual sponsorship deal by local builders Cobbydale Construction.

In 2016 the club again made ground improvements including new outside toilets and a new hospitality area named the '1904 Lounge' tracing the clubs routes back to its original formation.

In early 2017 the club built state of the art dug-outs to complement the completion of the exterior enclosure fencing.

For the 2020–21 season a new 100 seater stand was installed to replace the old wooden stand, and the following season the new 1904 hospitality suite, with bar and catering facilities, separate from the clubhouse, replaced the old Portacabin facility.

2022 saw local firm Office Interiors Wholesale become the new stadium sponsor.

== Records ==
- FA Cup best performance: first qualifying round – 2004–05 (replay), 2024–25
- FA Vase best performance: fourth round proper – 2023–24

== Honours ==
=== Craven League ===
- 1996–97
  - Northern Plant Hire Cup Winners
  - Division Two Runners Up
- 1997–98
  - Division One Runners Up
- 1998–99
  - Premier Division Champions
  - Premier League Cup Winners
  - Northern Plant Hire Cup Winners

=== West Riding County Amateur League ===
- 1999–2000 Division Two Champions
  - Division Two League Cup Winners
- 2000–01 Division One Champions
  - Division One League Cup Winners
  - Keighley & District Challenge Cup Winners
  - Division Two (reserves) League Cup Winners
- 2001–02
  - West Riding County Cup Winners
  - Keighley & District Cup Winners
  - Reserve Division Two Winners
  - Premier Division Runners-up
- 2002–03
  - West Riding County Cup Winners
  - Keighley & District Cup Winners
  - Premier Division Champions
  - Charity Shield Winners
  - Premier League Cup Winners
  - Keighley & District Supplementary Cup Winners
- 2003–04
  - Premier Division Champions
  - County Cup winners

=== North West Counties League ===
- 2004–05
  - Division Two (promoted)
- 2017–18
  - Division One winners
