= Eccleshall F.C. =

Association football club in England

Coordinates: 52°52′05.84″N 2°16′30.47″W

Eccleshall
- Full name: Eccleshall Football Club
- Nickname: The Eagles
- Founded: 1971
- Ground: Pershall Park, Eccleshall
- Chairman: Neil Washington
- League: North West Counties League Division One South
- 2025–26: North West Counties League Division One South, 2nd of 18
Home colours	Away colours

Eccleshall Football Club is a football club based in the Pershall area of Eccleshall in Staffordshire, England. They are currently members of the North West Counties League Division One South and play at Pershall Park.

== History ==
The club was established in 1971 with involvement from the staff at Eccleshall Secondary School and was originally named Eccleshall Old Boys. They joined the Mid-Staffordshire League, and in 1973–74 the club won the Division Three Cup and finished second in the division, earning promotion to Division Two. In 1974–75 the club won the Division Two Cup. In 1975 the club adopted its current name. They joined the Staffordshire County League in 1979 and were promoted to the Premier Division in 1980–81. In 1983–84 they won the Premier Division, the Premier Division Cup and the May Bank Cup. At the end of the season they became founder members of the Staffordshire Senior League.

Eccleshall were Staffordshire Senior League champions in 1989–90. In 1994 the league was renamed the Midland League, and in 1999–2000 the club were league runners-up. They went on to win back-to-back league titles in 2001–02 and 2002–03, after which they were promoted to Division Two of the North West Counties League. The club also won the Staffordshire FA Vase in 2002–03. Division Two was renamed Division One in 2008. When Division One was split in 2018, Eccleshall were placed in Division One South.

In 2024–25 Eccleshall finished fifth in Division One South, qualifying for the promotion play-offs, in which they lost 5–0 to Abbey Hulton United in the semi-finals. The following season saw them finish as runners-up in the division, going on to beat Stafford Town 5–1 in the play-off semi-finals before losing the final against Stockport Georgians on penalties.

== Ground ==
The club initially played at Eccleshall Secondary School, before buying a four-acre site at Pershall in 1981. The new ground opened in 1983 and was named Pershall Park. In the same year a small stand was erected, becoming known as 'the Shed'.

== Honours ==
- Midland League
  - Champions 1989–90 2001–02, 2002–03
- Staffordshire County League
  - Premier Division champions 1983–84
  - Premier Division Cup winners 1983–84
  - May Bank Cup winners 1983–84
- Mid-Staffordshire League
  - Division Two Cup winners 1975–76
  - Division Three Cup winners 1973–74
- Staffordshire FA Vase
  - Winners 2002–03

== Records ==
- Best FA Cup performance: First qualifying round, 2010–11
- Best FA Vase performance: Second round, 1991–92
- Record attendance: 2,011 vs FC United, 5 November 2005 (at Marston Road in Stafford)
  - At Pershall Park: 475 vs Stoke City, Staffordshire Senior Cup, 16 October 2019

== See also ==
- Eccleshall F.C. players
- Eccleshall F.C. managers
