= Barnoldswick Town F.C. =

Association football club in England

Coordinates: 53.923937°N 2.1888542°W

Barnoldswick Town
- Full name: Barnoldswick Town Football Club
- Nicknames: Town, Barlick
- Founded: 1972
- Ground: Greenberfield Lane, Barnoldswick
- Chairman: Stephen Chew
- Manager: Gerry Harrison & Lewis Craig
- League: North West Counties League Premier Division
- 2024–25: North West Counties League Premier Division, 17th of 24
| Home colours | Away colours |

Barnoldswick Town Football Club is a football club based in Barnoldswick, Lancashire, England. They are currently members of the North West Counties League Premier Division and play at Greenberfield Lane. They are affiliated to the West Riding County Football Association.

== History ==
The original Barnoldswick Town joined the Lancashire Combination in 1924. After finishing bottom of the league in 1932–33 and 1933–34, they left the league. They joined the Yorkshire League in 1935, but left after a single season, and subsequently folded.

The modern club was established in 1972 as Barnoldswick United (1972), and joined the Craven & District League, where they played until joining the East Lancashire League in the beginning of the 1990s. In 1997, they switched to Division Two of the West Lancashire League. After finishing as runners up in their first season, they were promoted to Division One.

The following season saw them win Division One, earning promotion to the Premier Division. In 2003, the club absorbed Barnoldswick Park Rovers and Salterforth Juniors, and was renamed Barnoldswick Town. A sixth-place finish in the 2008–09 season was enough to see them promoted to Division One of the North West Counties League. They earned back-to-back promotions after finishing as runners up in Division One in the 2009–10 season, and were promoted to the Premier Division.

== Honours ==
- West Lancashire League
  - Division One champions 1998–99
- Craven Cup
  - Winners 1987–88, 1993–94, 1997–98, 2010–11
- Morrison Cup
  - Winners 1985–86, 1994–95, 1996–97

== Records ==
- Best FA Cup performance: Second qualifying round, 2024–25
- Best FA Vase performance: Third round, 2012–13
- Record attendance: 1,004 vs Bury, North West Counties League Premier Division, 7 October 2023

== See also ==
- Barnoldswick Town F.C. players
