= Manchester Premier Cup =

Football tournament in Manchester, England

- Founded: 1934
- Region: Greater Manchester
- Teams: 15 (2017–18)
- Current champions: Droylsden F.C.
- Most championships: Ashton United (16 titles)
- Website: MP Cup

The Manchester Premier Cup (also known as the Frank Hannah Manchester Premier Cup) is an annual English football knockout tournament involving teams from Greater Manchester, England. It is a County Cup competition of the Manchester Football Association and involves Non-league football clubs, although at least one Football League club has entered the competition.

Droylsden F.C. are the current holders.

== History ==
The Manchester Premier Cup, originally known as the Manchester County FA Shield, was first competed for in the 1934–35 season, when Manchester North End beat Hurst (Note: Prior to 1947, Ashton United F.C. was known as Hurst F.C.) 5–2, in the final to become the inaugural champions at their Charles Street Ground in Blackley in front of a crowd of 2,400. The gate receipts of £59 were distributed 50% to the FA and 25% to each of the finalists. For the 1955–56 season the name was changed to the Manchester Intermediate Cup and was again changed for the 1979–80 season to the present name.

The competition has been dominated by the teams in the Tameside borough of Manchester who have won the contest 55 times. Central Manchester teams have won it six times, teams from Bury winning four times and Salford and Wigan twice. A team from outside the Greater Manchester borders has only ever won the trophy once.

== Finals ==
=== Key ===
Key to list of winners
| (R) | Replay |
| † | Match was won during extra time |
| ‡ | Match was won on a penalty shoot-out |

=== Results ===
Manchester Premier Cup winners
| Year | Winners | Score | Runners-up | Venue | Attendance | References |
1934 – 1955 the Cup was known as the Manchester Shield
| 1934–35 | Manchester North End | | Hurst | | | |
| 1935–36 | Hurst | | Ashton National | | | |
| 1936–37 | Ashton National | 3–1 | Mossley | Hurst Cross, Ashton-under-Lyne | | |
| 1937–38 | Mossley | 2–1 | Manchester North End | Hurst Cross, Ashton-under-Lyne | | |
| 1938–39 | Hurst | 2–3 | Mossley | National Park, Ashton-under-Lyne | | |
| 1939–40 | Ashton National | | Hurst | | | |
| 1940–41 | Urmston | | Ferguson Pailin | | | |
| 1941–42 | Avro | | Goslings | | | |
| 1942–43 | Army | | Avro | | | |
| 1943–44 | Goslings | | Ferranti (Note: Ferranti F.C. was the original name of Moston.) | | | |
| 1944–45 | Ashton National | | Goslings | | | |
| 1945–46 | Urmston | | Goslings | | | |
| 1946–47 | Droylsden | 3–0 | Mossley | Maine Road, Moss Side | | |
| 1947–48 | Goslings | | Droylsden | | | |
| 1948–49 | Mossley | 2–1 | Goslings | Hurst Cross, Ashton-under-Lyne | | |
| 1949–50 | Ashton United | | Goslings | | | |
| 1950–51 | Lancashire Steel | 2–1 | Mossley | | | |
| 1951–52 | Droylsden | | Lancashire Steel | | | |
| 1952–53 | Ashton United | | Northern Nomads | | | |
| 1953–54 | Ashton United | | Hyde United | | | |
| 1954–55 | Ashton United | | Stalybridge Celtic | | | |
1955 – 1979 the Cup was known as the Manchester Intermediate Cup
| 1955–56 | Hyde United; Oldham Athletic | | | | | |
| 1956–57 | Hyde United | | Stalybridge Celtic | | | |
| 1957–58 | Stalybridge Celtic | | Hyde United | | | |
| 1958–59 | Ashton United | 6–2 | Mossley | Hurst Cross, Ashton-under-Lyne | | |
| 1959–60 | Droylsden | | Hyde United | | | |
| 1960–61 | Mossley | 4–0 | Ashton United | Seel Park, Mossley | | |
| 1961–62 | Bury | | Northern Nomads | | | |
| 1962–63 | Ashton United | | Droylsden | | | |
| 1963–64 | Bury | 4–0 | Mossley | Seel Park, Mossley | | |
| 1964–65 | Droylsden | | Ashton United | | | |
| 1965–66 | Ashton United | | Droylsden | | | |
| 1966–67 | Prestwich Heys | 4–2 | Mossley | Grimshaw Park, Prestwich | | |
| 1966–67 | Mossley | 6–1 | Prestwich Heys | Seel Park, Mossley | | |
| 1966–67 | Mossley won 8–5 on aggregate | | | | | |
| 1967–68 | Mossley | 4–2 | Stalybridge Celtic | Seel Park, Mossley | | |
| 1967–68 | Mossley | 2–2 | Stalybridge Celtic | Bower Fold, Stalybridge | | |
| 1967–68 | Mossley won 6–4 on aggregate | | | | | |
| 1968–69 | Stalybridge Celtic | | Droylsden | | | |
| 1969–70 | Droylsden | | Stalybridge Celtic | | | |
| 1970–71 | Dukinfield Town | | Curzon Ashton | | | |
| 1971–72 | Curzon Ashton | | Irlam Town | | | |
| 1972–73 | Curzon Ashton | | New Mills | | | |
| 1973–74 | Curzon Ashton | | New Mills | | | |
| 1974–75 | Little Lever | | Chadderton | | | |
| 1975–76 | Maine Road | | Abbey Hey W.M.C. | | | |
| 1976–77 | Maine Road | | Little Lever | | | |
| 1977–78 | Salford Amateurs | | Massey Ferguson | | | |
| 1978–79 | Salford Amateurs | | Irlam Town | | | |
1979 – present the Cup is known as the Manchester Premier Cup
| 1979–80 | Ashton United | | Curzon Ashton | | | |
| 1980–81 | Droylsden | | Ashton Town | | | |
| 1981–82 | Curzon Ashton | | Irlam Town | | | |
| 1982–83 | Ashton United | | Chadderton | | | |
| 1983–84 | Curzon Ashton | | Droylsden | | | |
| 1984–85 | Irlam Town | | Curzon Ashton | | | |
| 1985–86 | Curzon Ashton | | Irlam Town | | | |
| 1986–87 | Curzon Ashton | 1–0 | Flixton | Gigg Lane, Bury | | |
| 1987–88 | Maine Road | 1–0 | Irlam Town | Maine Road, Moss Side | | |
| 1988–89 | Mossley | 3–1 | Flixton | Brantingham Road, Chorlton-cum-Hardy | | |
| 1989–90 | Curzon Ashton | | Salford City | | | |
| 1990–91 | Mossley | 3–2 | Droylsden | Maine Road, Moss Side | | |
| 1991–92 | Ashton United | 2–1 | Flixton | | | |
| 1992–93 | Droylsden | 2–0 | Curzon Ashton | | | |
| 1993–94 | Hyde United | 4–1 | Droylsden | | | |
| 1994–95 | Hyde United | 2–1 | Trafford | | | |
| 1995–96 | Hyde United | 2–2 ^{‡} | Curzon Ashton | | | |
| 1996–97 | Glossop North End | 1–1 ^{‡} | Trafford | Old Trafford, Stretford | | |
| 1997–98 | Glossop North End | 1–0 | Radcliffe Borough | Maine Road, Moss Side | | |
| 1998–99 | Hyde United | 1–0 | Maine Road | Boundary Park, Oldham | | |
| 1999–00 | Droylsden | 2–1 | Mossley | Boundary Park, Oldham | | |
| 2000–01 | Ashton United | 4–0 | Droylsden | | | |
| 2001–02 | Ashton United | 3–1 | Salford City | | | |
| 2002–03 | Ashton United | 2–0 | Droylsden | Boundary Park, Oldham | | |
| 2003–04 | Droylsden | 2–1 ^{†} | Ashton United | Boundary Park, Oldham | | |
| 2004–05 | Hyde United | 5–4 | Maine Road | Boundary Park, Oldham | 464 | |
| 2005–06 | Hyde United | 2–1 | Droylsden | Manchester Regional Arena, Sportcity | 578 | |
| 2006–07 | Droylsden | 3–0 | Flixton | | 317 | |
| 2007–08 | Radcliffe Borough | 2–1 | Hyde United | Boundary Park, Oldham | 276 | |
| 2008–09 | Droylsden | 2–1 | Mossley | Boundary Park, Oldham | | |
| 2009–10 | Droylsden | 2–0 | Trafford | Ewen Fields, Hyde | 256 | |
| 2010–11 | Droylsden | 4–3 ^{†} | Ashton United | Ewen Fields, Hyde | | |
| 2011–12 | Mossley | w/o | Droylsden | Ewen Fields, Hyde | — | |
| 2012–13 | Mossley | 2–2 ^{‡} (Note: Score was 2–2 after 90 minutes and went straight to penalties. Mossley won 4–2 on penalties.) | Salford City | Edgeley Park, Stockport | 617 | |
| 2013–14 | Trafford | 2–2 ^{‡} (Note: Score was 2–2 after 90 minutes and went straight to penalties. Trafford won 4–2 on penalties.) | Hyde | Gigg Lane, Bury | 580 | |
| 2014–15 | Mossley | 1–1 ^{‡} (Note: Score was 1–1 after 90 minutes and went straight to penalties. Mossley won 3–1 on penalties.) | Curzon Ashton | Boundary Park, Oldham | 548 | |
| 2015–16 | Mossley | 3–1 | Stalybridge Celtic | Ewen Fields, Hyde | 542 | |
| 2016–17 | F.C. United of Manchester | 1–0 | Stalybridge Celtic | Boundary Park, Oldham | 1,592 | |
| 2017–18 | F.C. United of Manchester | 2–2 ^{‡} (Note: Score was 2–2 after 90 minutes and went straight to penalties. FC United won 3–2 on penalties.) | Trafford | Ewen Fields, Hyde | 1,003 | |
| 2018–19 | Curzon Ashton | 3–1 | Mossley | Ewen Fields, Hyde | 668 | |
| 2019–20 | Competition did not complete due to the COVID-19 pandemic | | | | | |
| 2020–21 | Competition did not complete due to the COVID-19 pandemic | | | | | |
| 2021–22 | Ashton United | 1–0 | Hyde United | Broadhurst Park, Moston | | |
| 2022–23 | Radcliffe | 3–0 | Wythenshawe Town | Broadhurst Park, Moston | 1,108 | |
| 2023–24 | Ashton United | 0–0 ‡ (Note: Ashton United won 5–4 on penalties) | Avro | Boundary Park, Oldham | | |
| 2024–25 | Irlam | 3–2 | Hyde United | Broadhurst Park, Moston | 800 | |
| 2025–26 | Droylsden | 2–1 | Curzon Ashton | Broadhurst Park, Moston | 953 | |

Source (1934–2010 Finals):

== Results by team ==
Teams shown in italics are no longer in existence.

Results by team
| Club | Wins | First final won | Last final won | Runners-up | Last final lost | Total final appearances |
|---|---|---|---|---|---|---|
| Ashton United | 17 | 1936 | 2024 | 6 | 2011 | 23 |
| Droylsden | 14 | 1947 | 2026 | 11 | 2012 | 25 |
| Mossley | 11 | 1938 | 2016 | 8 | 2009 | 19 |
| Curzon Ashton | 9 | 1972 | 2019 | 7 | 2026 | 16 |
| Hyde United (Note: Between to 2010 and 2015, Hyde United F.C. was known as Hyde F.C.) | 8 | 1956 | 2006 | 6 | 2022 | 14 |
| Maine Road | 3 | 1976 | 1988 | 2 | 2005 | 5 |
| Ashton National | 3 | 1937 | 1945 | 1 | 1936 | 4 |
| Goslings | 2 | 1944 | 1948 | 5 | 1950 | 7 |
| Stalybridge Celtic | 2 | 1958 | 1969 | 6 | 2017 | 8 |
| Salford City (Note: From 1963–1989, Salford City F.C. was known as Salford Amateurs. Prior to 1963, they were known as Salford Central.) | 2 | 1978 | 1979 | 3 | 2013 | 5 |
| Urmston | 2 | 1941 | 1946 | 0 | – | 2 |
| Bury | 2 | 1962 | 1964 | 0 | – | 2 |
| Glossop North End | 2 | 1997 | 1998 | 0 | – | 2 |
| F.C. United of Manchester | 2 | 2017 | 2018 | 0 | – | 2 |
| Irlam Town | 1 | 1985 | 1985 | 5 | 1988 | 6 |
| Trafford | 1 | 2014 | 2014 | 4 | 2018 | 5 |
| Manchester North End | 1 | 1935 | 1935 | 1 | 1938 | 2 |
| Avro | 1 | 1942 | 1942 | 2 | 2024 | 3 |
| Lancashire Steel | 1 | 1951 | 1951 | 1 | 1952 | 2 |
| Little Lever | 1 | 1975 | 1975 | 1 | 1977 | 2 |
| Radcliffe Borough | 1 | 2008 | 2008 | 1 | 1998 | 2 |
| Army | 1 | 1943 | 1943 | 0 | – | 1 |
| Oldham Athletic | 1 | 1956 | 1956 | 0 | – | 1 |
| Dukinfield Town | 1 | 1971 | 1971 | 0 | – | 1 |
| Flixton | 0 | – | – | 4 | 2007 | 4 |
| Northern Nomads | 0 | – | – | 2 | 1962 | 2 |
| New Mills | 0 | – | – | 2 | 1974 | 2 |
| Chadderton | 0 | – | – | 2 | 1983 | 2 |
| Ferguson Pailin | 0 | – | – | 1 | 1941 | 1 |
| Ferranti | 0 | – | – | 1 | 1944 | 1 |
| Prestwich Heys | 0 | – | – | 1 | 1967 | 1 |
| Abbey Hey (Note: Prior to 1985, Abbey Hey F.C. was known as Abbey Hey W.M.C. F.C.) | 0 | – | – | 1 | 1976 | 1 |
| Massey Ferguson | 0 | – | – | 1 | 1978 | 1 |
| Ashton Town | 0 | – | – | 1 | 1981 | 1 |

== See also ==
- List of football clubs in Greater Manchester
- Liverpool Senior Cup
- Lancashire Senior Cup
- Lancashire Challenge Trophy
