= List of football clubs in Greater Manchester =

This is a list of football clubs based in Greater Manchester, sorted by the league they play in as of the 2024–25 season. The leagues are listed in order of their level in the English football league system, and in the English women's football league system.

Locations of men's football clubs in Greater Manchester from levels 1–10. Clubs in levels 1–4 are shown in bold.

== Men's teams ==
=== Levels 1–4 ===
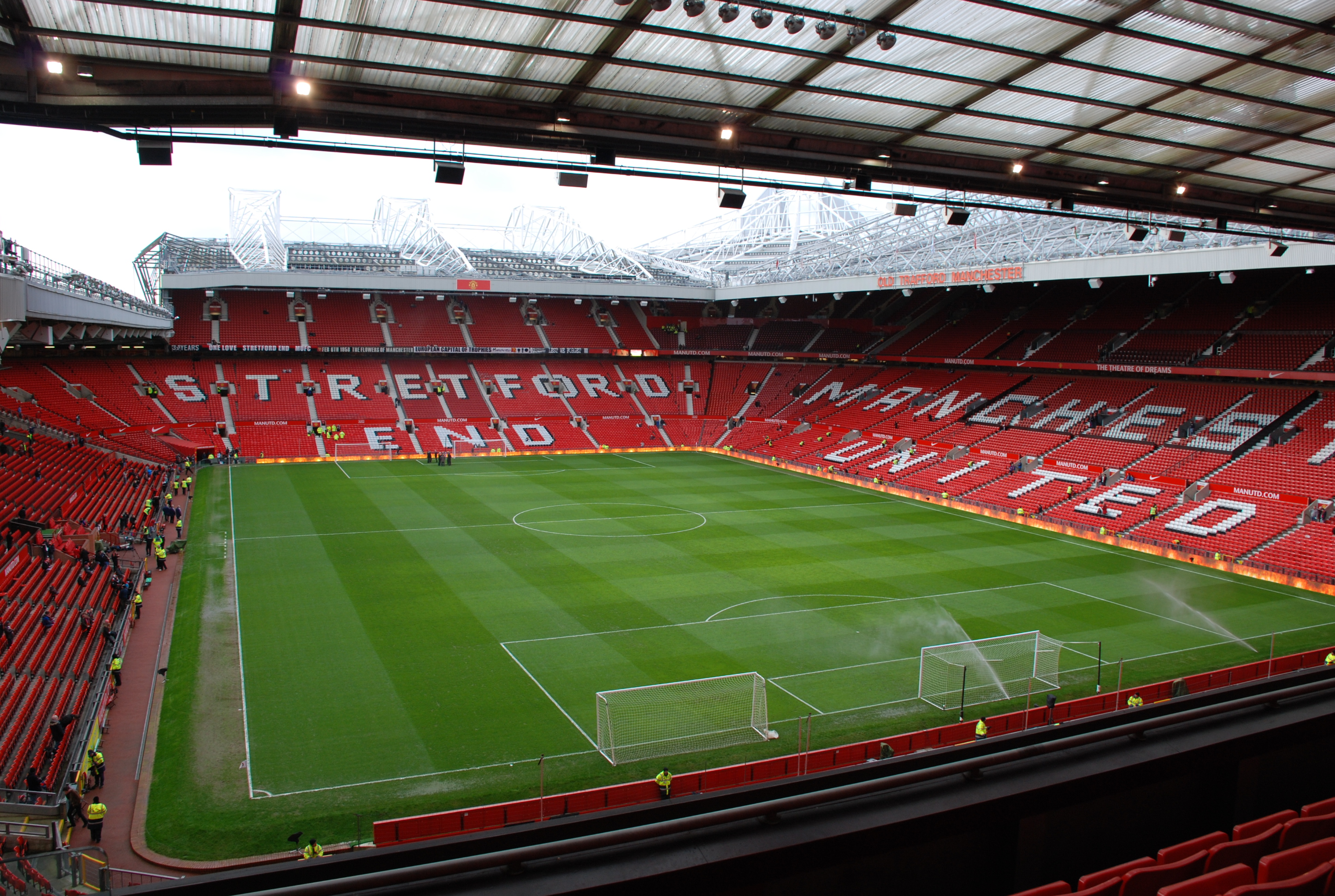
Old Trafford, home of Manchester United

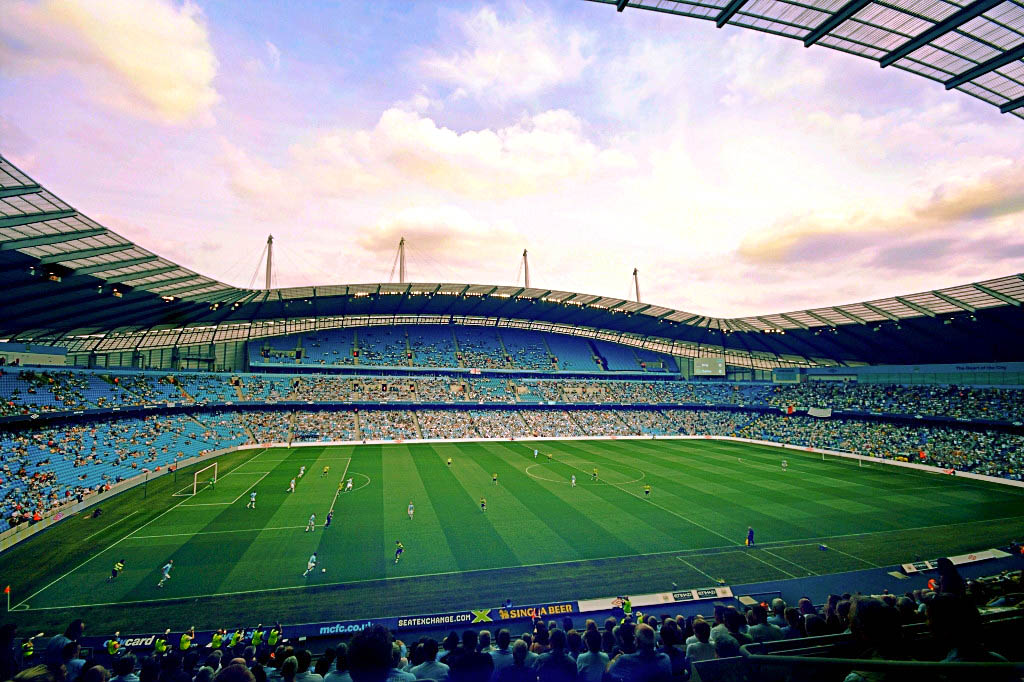
Etihad Stadium, home of Manchester City

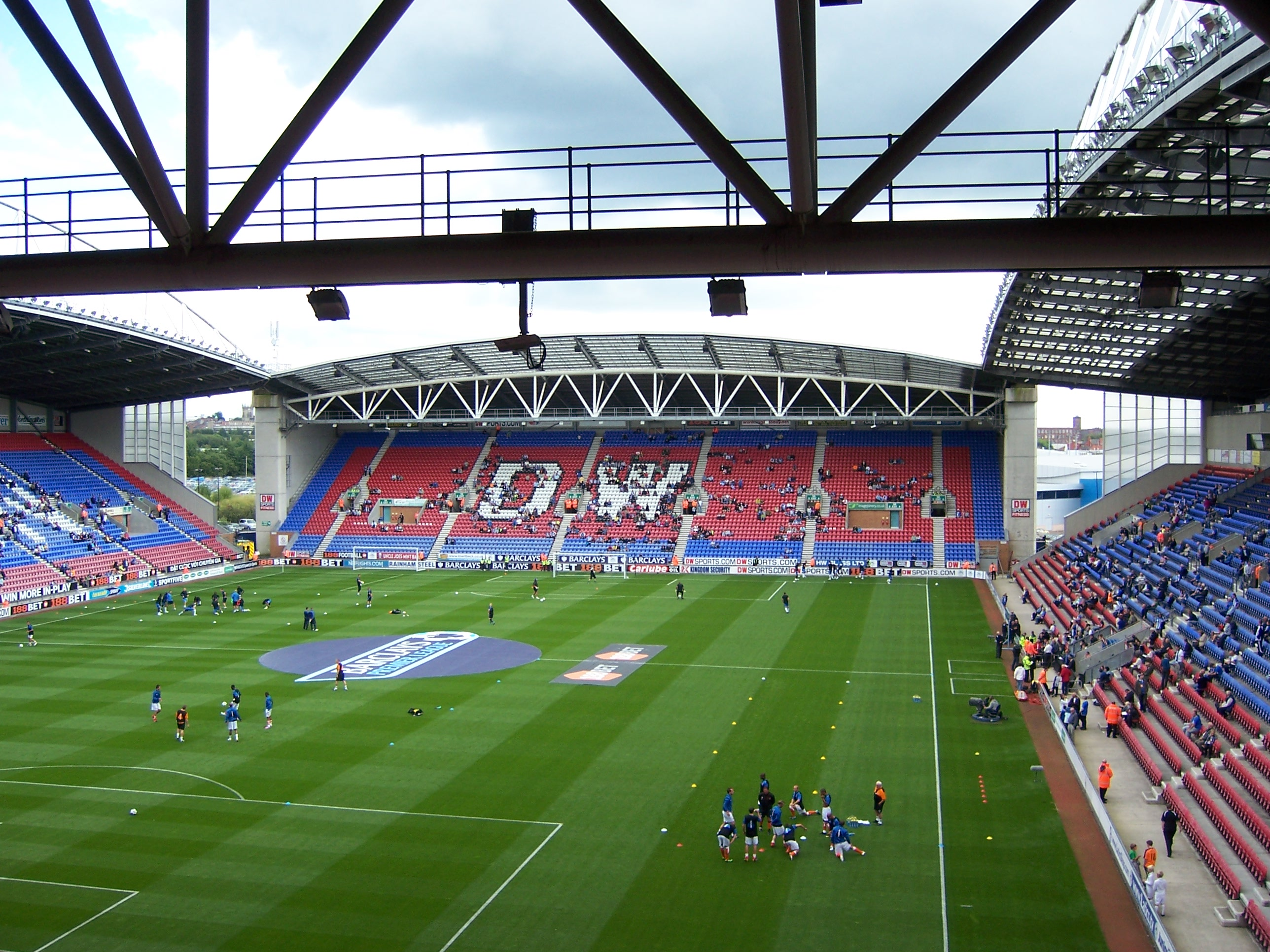
DW Stadium, home of Wigan Athletic

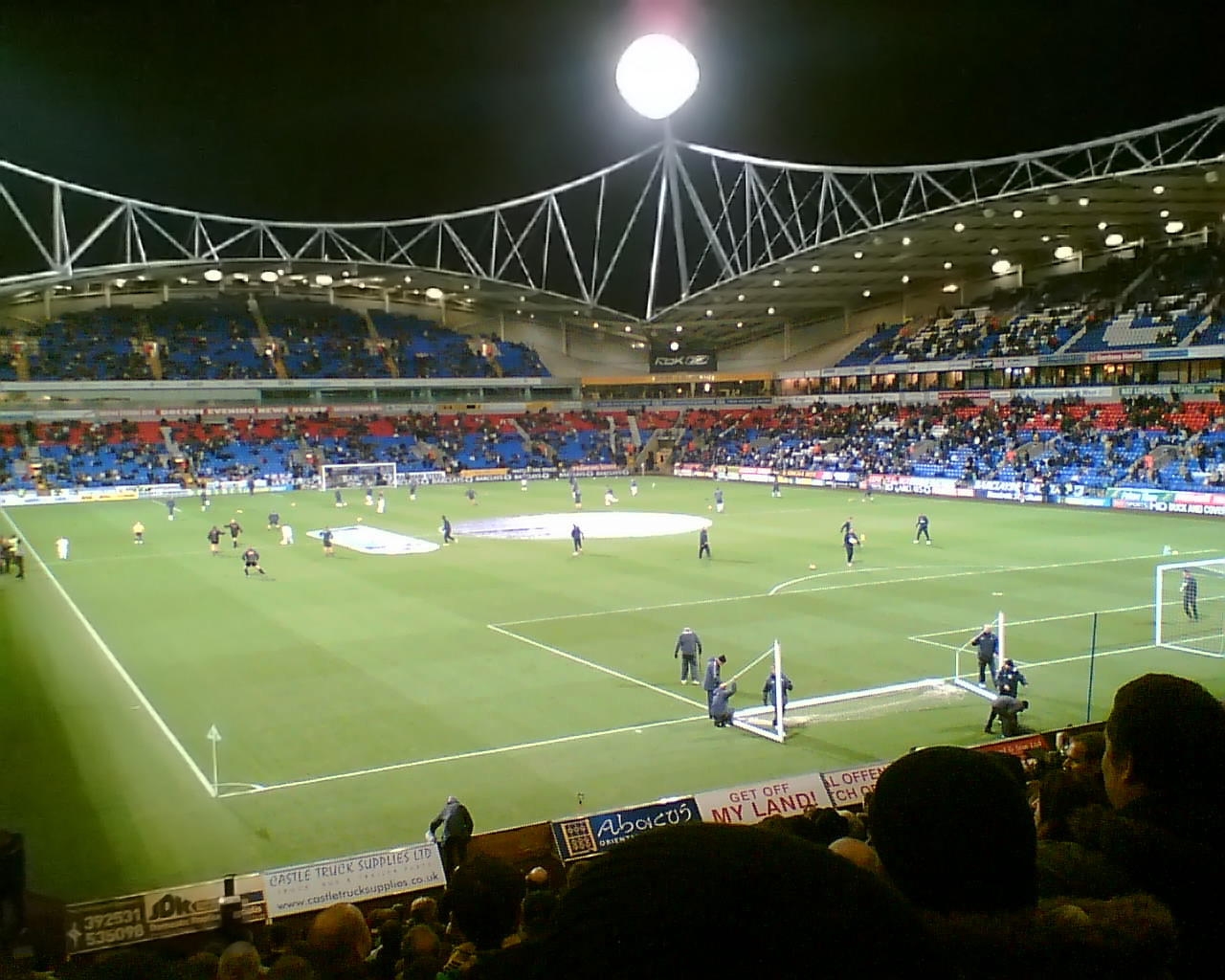
University of Bolton Stadium, home of Bolton Wanderers

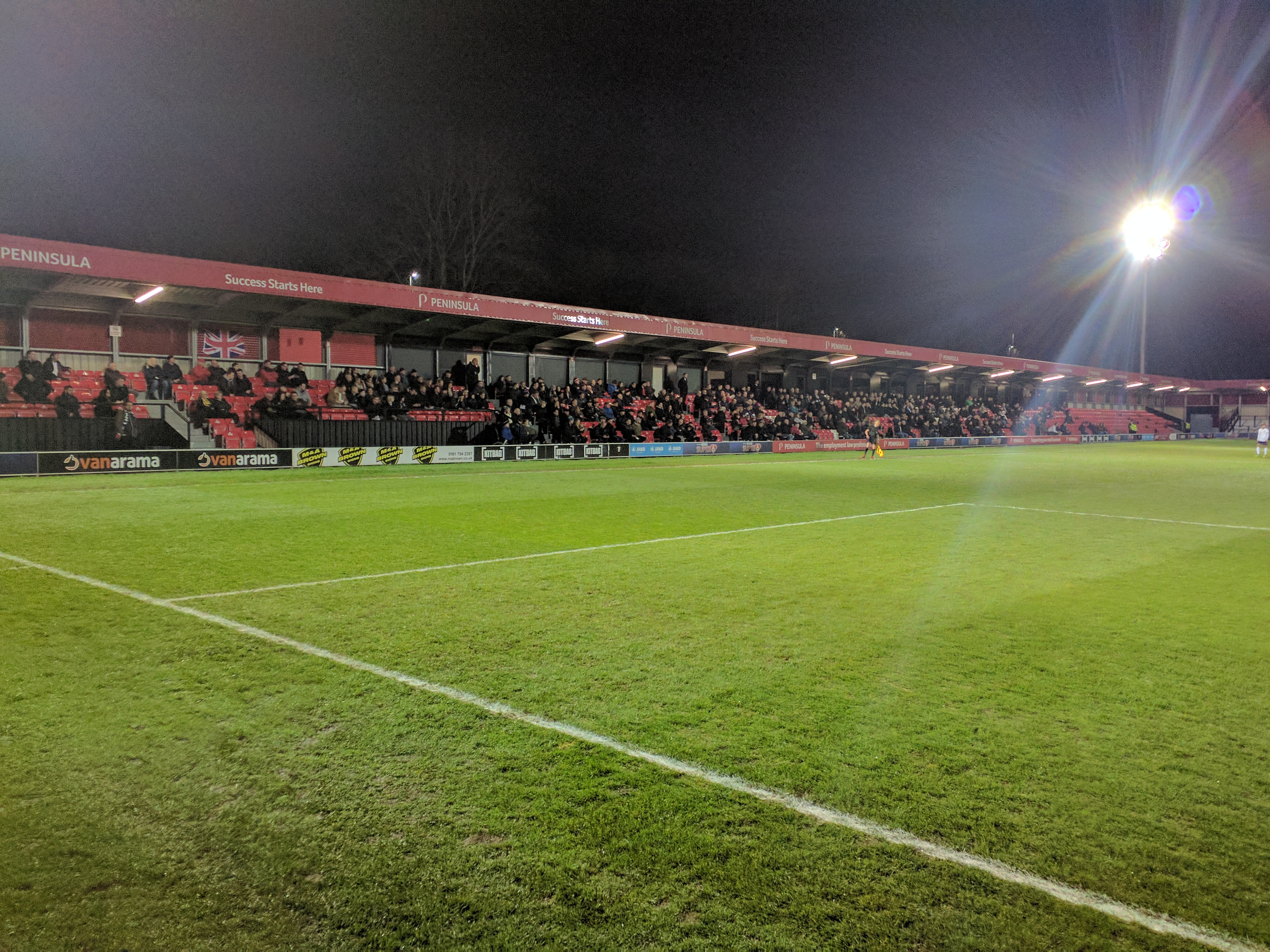
Moor Lane, home of Salford City

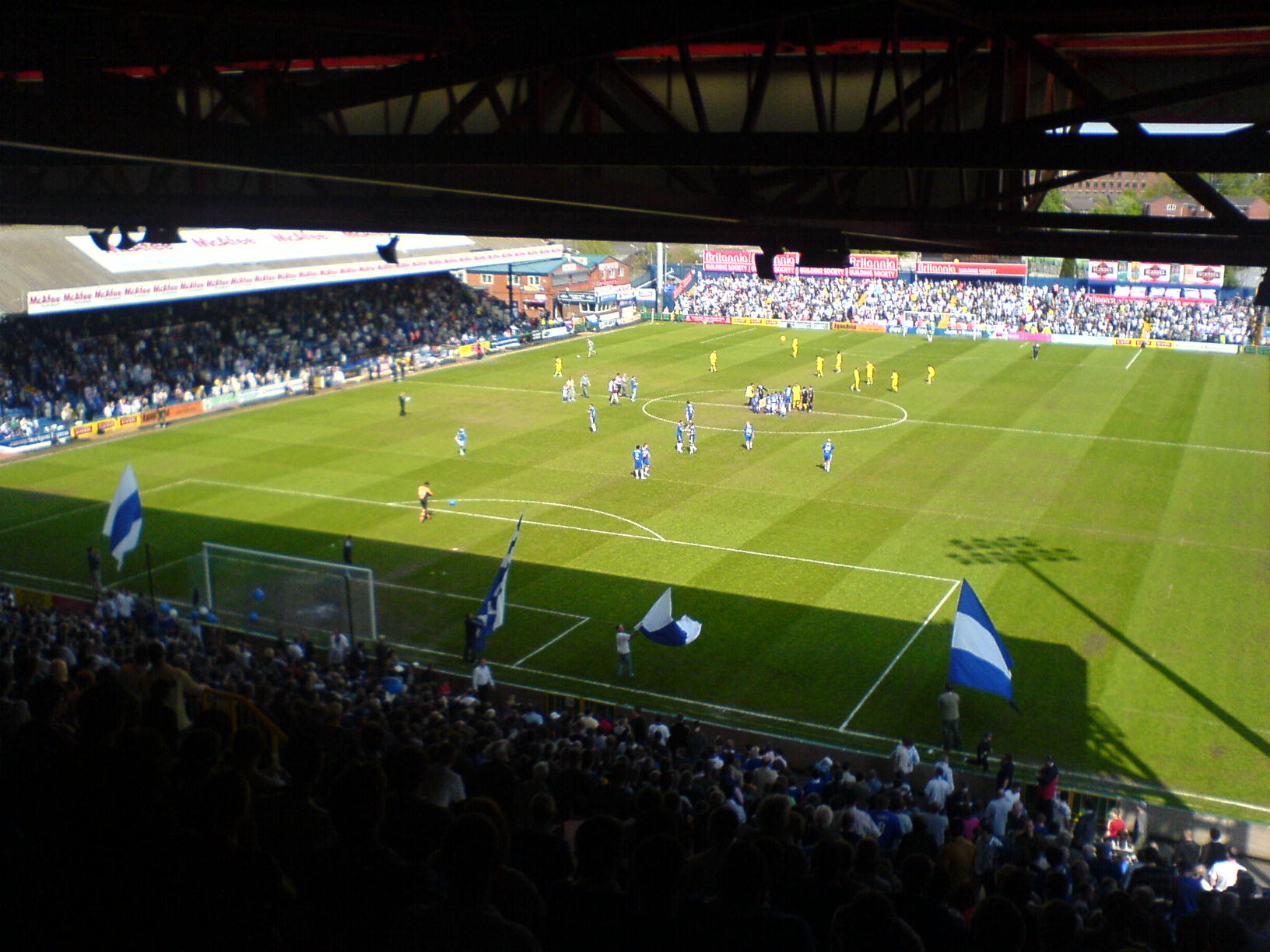
Edgeley Park, home of Stockport County

These clubs play in fully professional leagues, at levels 1–4 of the English football league system as of the 2024–25 season.

Club	League	Home ground	Borough
Level 1
Manchester City	Premier League	Etihad Stadium	Manchester
Manchester United	Premier League	Old Trafford	Trafford
Level 2
Bolton Wanderers	EFL Championship	University of Bolton Stadium	Bolton
Level 3
Stockport County	EFL League One	Edgeley Park	Stockport
Wigan Athletic	EFL League One	DW Stadium	Wigan
Level 4
Salford City	EFL League Two	Moor Lane	Salford
Oldham Athletic	EFL League Two	Boundary Park	Oldham
Rochdale	EFL League Two	Crown Oil Arena	Rochdale

Locations of Greater Manchester's Premier League and Football League clubs
Blue: Premier League (Level 1)
Red: EFL Championship (Level 2)
Green: EFL League One (Level 3)
Yellow: EFL League Two (Level 4)

=== Levels 5–8 ===
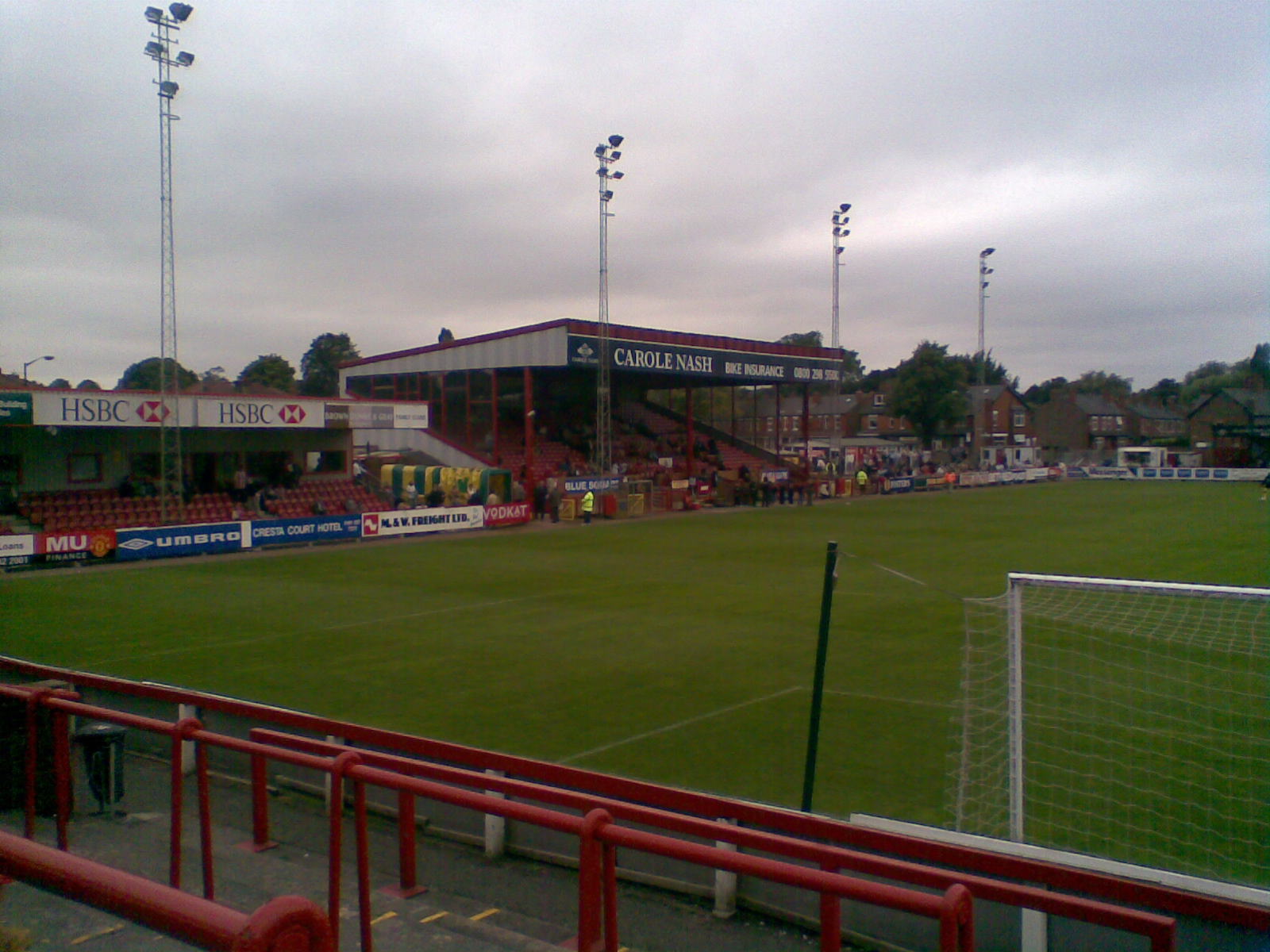
Moss Lane, home of Altrincham

These clubs play in semi-professional and amateur leagues, at levels 5–8 of the English football league system as of the 2024–25 season.

Club	League	Home ground	Borough
Level 5
Altrincham	National League	Moss Lane	Trafford
Level 6
Curzon Ashton	National League North	Tameside Stadium	Tameside
Radcliffe	National League North	Stainton Park	Bury
Level 7
Ashton United	Northern Premier League Premier Division	Hurst Cross	Tameside
F.C. United of Manchester	Northern Premier League Premier Division	Broadhurst Park	Manchester
Hyde United	Northern Premier League Premier Division	Ewen Fields	Tameside
Level 8
Atherton Collieries	Northern Premier League Division One West	Alder Street	Wigan
Avro	Northern Premier League Division One West	Whitebank Stadium	Oldham
Bury	Northern Premier League Division One West	Gigg Lane	Bury
Mossley	Northern Premier League Division One West	Seel Park	Tameside
Stalybridge Celtic	Northern Premier League Division One West	Bower Fold	Tameside
Trafford	Northern Premier League Division One West	Shawe View	Trafford
Wythenshawe Town	Northern Premier League Division One West	Ericstan Park	Wythenshawe

Locations of Greater Manchester's National League and Northern Premier League clubs
Yellow: National League (Level 5)
Green: National League North (Level 6)
Red: NPL Premier Division (Level 7)
Blue: NPL Division One North West (Level 8)

=== Levels 9–10 ===
These Greater Manchester clubs play in semi-professional and amateur leagues that grant eligibility to enter the FA Vase and are high enough in the English football league system to grant eligibility for the FA Cup, comprising levels 9–10 of the system. In Greater Manchester, this consists solely of the North West Counties Football League.

Club	League	Home ground	Borough
Level 9
Abbey Hey	North West Counties Football League Premier Division	The Abbey Stadium	Manchester
Atherton Laburnum Rovers	North West Counties Football League Premier Division	Crilly Park	Wigan
Chadderton	North West Counties Football League Premier Division	Andrew Street	Oldham
Cheadle Town	North West Counties Football League Premier Division	Park Road Stadium	Stockport
Irlam	North West Counties Football League Premier Division	Silver Street	Salford
Prestwich Heys	North West Counties Football League Premier Division	Adie Moran Park	Bury
Ramsbottom United	North West Counties Football League Premier Division	The Harry Williams Riverside Stadium	Bury
Stockport Town	North West Counties Football League Premier Division	Stockport Sports Village	Stockport
West Didsbury & Chorlton	North West Counties Football League Premier Division	Brookburn Road	Manchester
Wythenshawe	North West Counties Football League Premier Division	Hollyhedge Park	Wythenshawe
Level 10
Ashton Athletic	North West Counties Football League Division One North	Brocstedes Park	Wigan
Ashton Town	North West Counties Football League Division One North	Edge Green Street	Wigan
Cheadle Heath Nomads	North West Counties Football League Division One North	The Heath	Stockport
Daisy Hill	North West Counties Football League Division One North	New Sirs	Bolton
Maine Road	North West Counties Football League Division One North	Brantingham Road	Manchester
Stockport Georgians	North West Counties Football League Division One South	Cromley Road	Stockport

=== Levels 11–12 ===
These Greater Manchester clubs play in amateur leagues, levels 11–12. This includes the Manchester League, the Cheshire Football League, and the West Lancashire Football League.

==== Cheshire League ====
Premier Division

- Altrincham Reserves
- Broadheath Central
- Denton Town
- Winstanley Warriors
- Whalley Range

League 1

- Cheadle Heath Nomads Reserves
- Denton Town
- Golborne Sports
- Maine Road Reserves
- Wythenshawe Reserves

==== Manchester League ====
Premier Division

- Atherton Town
- Bolton County
- Chadderton Reserves
- Dukinfield Town
- Heyside
- Heywood St James
- Hindsford
- Manchester Gregorian
- Moorside Rangers
- Old Altrinchamians
- Pennington
- Rochdale Sacred Heart
- Royton Town
- Springhead
- Uppermill
- Walshaw Sports

Division One

- AFC Monton
- Altrincham Hale
- Avenue
- Avro Reserves
- Bolton Borough
- Bolton Lads and Girls
- Bolton United
- Boothstown
- East Manchester
- Elton Vale
- Govan and Uni of Manchester
- Hindley Juniors
- Manchester Central

==== West Lancashire League ====
Division One

- Eagley

== Women's teams ==
=== Levels 1–4 ===
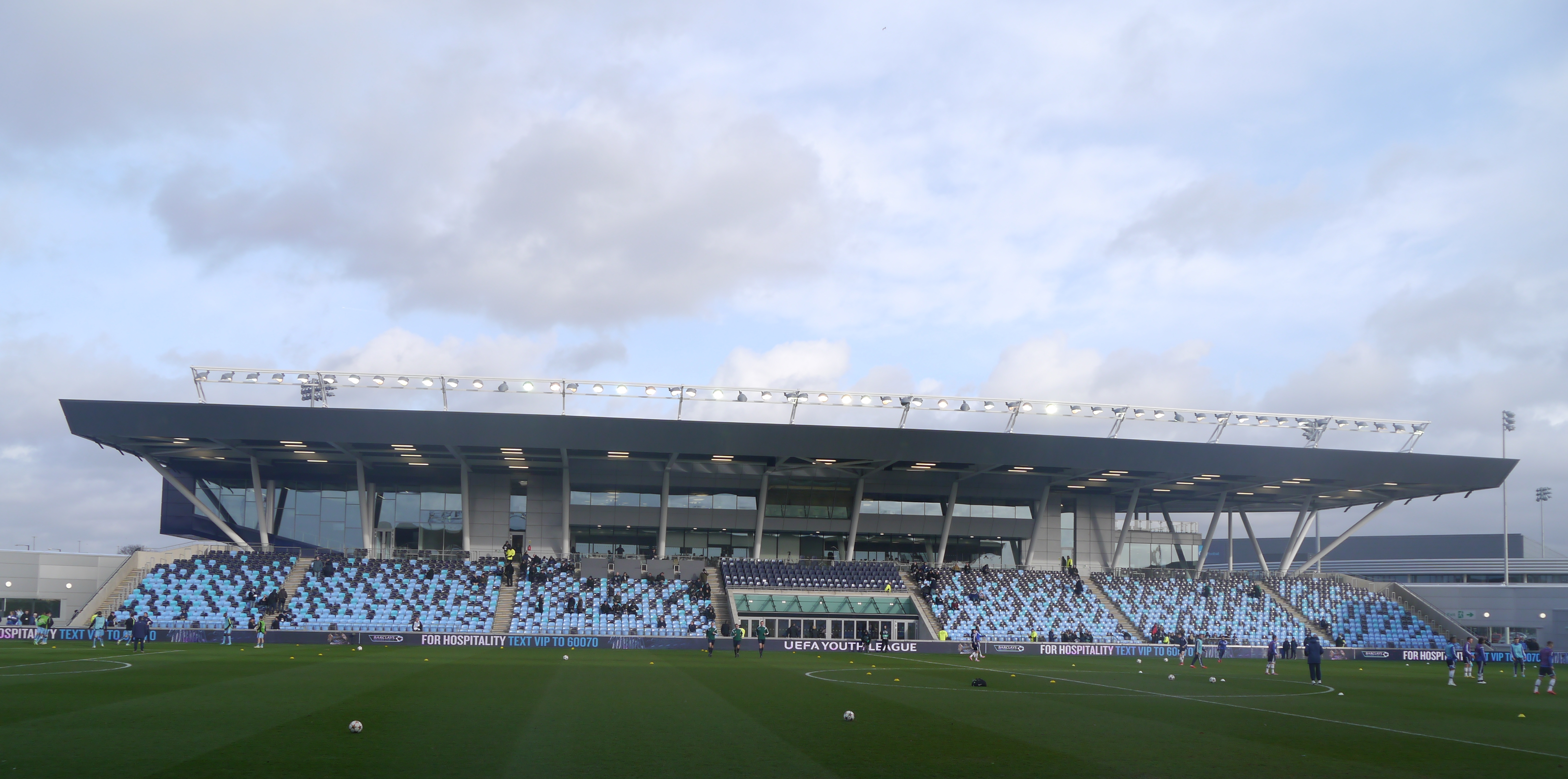
Etihad Academy Stadium, home of Manchester City Women

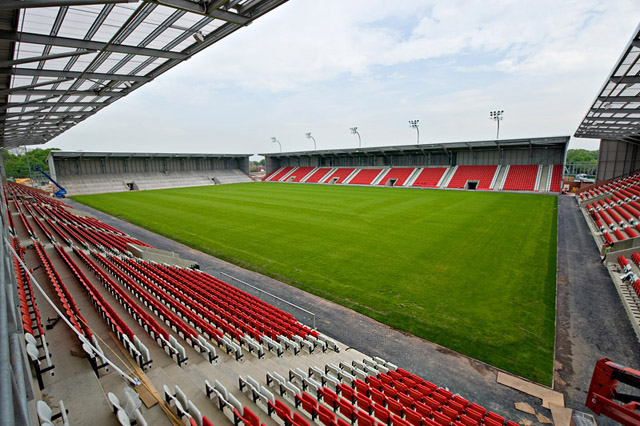
Leigh Sports Village, home of Manchester United Women

These clubs play in fully professional leagues at levels 1–4 of the English women's football league system as of the 2022–23 season.

Club	League	Home ground	Borough
Level 1
**Manchester City**	Women's Super League	Joie Stadium	Manchester
**Manchester United**	Women's Super League	Leigh Sports Village	Wigan
Level 4
**Stockport County**	Women's National League: Division One North	Stockport Sports Village	Stockport

Locations of Greater Manchester's Super League, Championship, and National League clubs
Blue: Women's Super League (Level 1)
Red: Women's Championship (Level 2)
Green: National League Premier Division (Level 3)
Yellow: National League Division One (Level 4)

=== Levels 5–6 ===
==== North West Women's Regional Football League ====
Premier Division (Level 5)

- Bury
- F.C. United of Manchester
- Manchester Stingers
- Mossley Hill Athletic
- Wigan Athletic

Division One North (Level 6)

- Leigh Genesis

Division One South (Level 6)

- Altrincham
- Curzon Ashton
- Salford City Lionesses
- Wythenshawe Amateurs

=== Levels 7–8 ===
==== Greater Manchester Women's Football League ====
Division One (Level 7)

- Ashton United
- Didsbury FC
- Heyside Ladies FC
- Langho Ladies
- Mosley AFC Ladies
- Rochdale AFC Ladies
- Sale Ladies
- Tameside United
- Urmston Meadowside
- West Didsbury and Chorlton Women

Division Two (Level 8)

- AFC Lionesses
- AFC Oldham Ladies
- Bolton Lads & Girls Club Ladies
- Boltonians Ladies
- Crompton FC Ladies
- Flixton Ladies
- Mancunian Unity Women
- Stockport Lionesses
- Swinton FC Ladies
- Walshaw Sports
- Greater Manchester FC

== See also ==
- Football in Manchester
