= Manchester Football Association =

Governing body of association football in Manchester, England

- Purpose: Football Association
- Headquarters: House of Sport Manchester; Gate 13; Rowsley Street; The Etihad Campus
- Location: Manchester, Greater Manchester, M11 3FF
- Chief Executive: Colin Bridgford
- Website: www.manchesterfa.com

The Manchester Football Association (also known as the Manchester FA) was established in 1885 and is the governing body for association football in the centre of the city of Manchester, England. They are responsible for the governance and development of football at all levels in the area.

== Administration ==
The administrative area covered by the Manchester FA and Lancashire County FA overlaps Cheshire FA, Derbyshire FA, and Liverpool County FA. According to the Memorandum on Areas and Overlapping of Associations the Manchester FA covers the area 12 miles from Manchester Town Hall.

The Manchester FA administration headquarters was located at the Platt Lane Complex until 2018, and was then moved to the Manchester Tennis and Football Centre in the Etihad Campus in May of that year.

== Affiliated leagues ==
=== Men's Saturday leagues ===
- Manchester Football League
- Lancashire and Cheshire Amateur League
- Manchester Saturday Morning League (1989)
- Wigan and District League

=== Other leagues ===
- Greater Manchester Ability Counts Football League (2003)
- Greater Manchester Police League (1975)
- Greater Manchester Veterans League (2001)
- ISS League (Wednesdays) (2004)
- Manchester Jewish Soccer League (1948)
- South Manchester and Cheshire Christian League

=== Men's Sunday leagues ===
- Cheshire and Manchester Sunday League (1971)
- Eccles Sunday League (1969)
- Hyde & District Sunday League (1968)
- Manchester Accountants Sunday League
- Manchester Amateur Sunday League (1947)
- Middleton and District Sunday League (1959)
- Oldham Sunday Football League (1970)
- Stockport and Cheadle Sunday League
- Tameside Sunday League (1965)

=== Ladies and girls leagues ===
- Greater Manchester Women's Football League
- Cheshire and Manchester Women's League
- North Manchester Girls League (2000)
- South Manchester Girls League (2003)

=== Youth leagues ===
- Bury and Radcliffe Junior League
- City of Salford Soccer League
- East Manchester Junior League (1970)
- Manchester Youth and Mini Soccer League (1982)
- North Bury Junior League (1973)
- Stockport Metro Junior League
- Tameside and District Junior League (1970)
- Timperley Junior League

=== Small sided leagues ===
- Manchester College Small Sided League
- Manchester FA Business League Summer 6's
- Manchester Futsal League
- Manchester Women's Small Sided League
- Salford Small Sided Veterans League

== Disbanded or Amalgamated Leagues ==
A number of leagues that were affiliated to the Manchester FA have disbanded or amalgamated with other leagues including:

- Ashton and District League
- Ashton and District Sunday League (formed in 1959 and disbanded in 2010)
- Blackley Amateur Sunday League
- Bury Amateur League
- Eccles and District Amateur League
- Manchester Amateur League
- Manchester and District Alliance
- Oldham Amateur League
- Reddish and District Junior League (now known as the East Manchester Junior League)
- Rochdale Alliance (disbanded in 2017)
- Rusholme Sunday League
- Salford Sunday League
- South Manchester and Wythenshawe League

== Affiliated Member Clubs ==
Among the notable clubs that are affiliated to the Manchester FA are:

- Abbey Hey
- Ashton United
- Chadderton
- Curzon Ashton
- F.C. United of Manchester
- Flixton
- Glossop North End
- Hyde United
- Irlam
- Maine Road
- Mossley
- New Mills
- Oldham Athletic
- Oldham Boro
- Prestwich Heys
- Reddish North End
- Rochdale
- Trafford
- Wythenshawe Amateurs

Clubs in the Premier League and The Football League that are located in the Manchester area include:

- Bolton Wanderers
- Manchester City
- Manchester United
- Salford City
- Wigan Athletic

Other clubs that are affiliated to the Manchester FA include:

- Atherton Town
- Avenue FC
- AVRO
- Beechfield United
- Breightmet United
- Bury Amateurs
- Chapel Town
- Dean Youth & Ladies
- Dukinfield Town
- East Manchester
- Elton Vale
- Fives Athletic
- GM Police 'D' Division
- Heywood St. James
- Hindsford
- Hollinwood
- Leigh Athletic
- Manchester Gregorians
- Manchester Maccabi
- Manchester Utd Supporters
- Monton Amateurs
- Old Altrinchamians
- Old Stretfordians
- Pennington
- Rochdale Sacred Heart
- Royton Town
- Salford Victoria
- Springhead
- Stand Athletic
- Standians
- Stockport Georgians
- Stretford Victoria
- Urmston Meadowside
- Walshaw Sports
- West Didsbury & Chorlton
- Whitworth Valley
- Wilmslow Albion
- Wythenshawe Town

== County Cup Competitions ==
The Manchester FA run the following Cup Competitions:

- Manchester Senior Cup
- Manchester Premier Cup
- Manchester Challenge Trophy
- Manchester Amateur Cup
- Manchester Amateur Sunday Cup
- Manchester Sunday Shield
- Charter Standard Adult (Men's) Cup Competition
- Manchester Youth U11 (9 v 9) Cup
- Manchester Youth U11 Cup
- Manchester Youth U12 Cup
- Manchester Youth U13 Cup
- Manchester Youth U14 Cup
- Manchester Youth U15 Cup
- Manchester Youth U16 Cup
- Manchester Youth U18 Cup
- Girls & Women's OPEN AGE County Cup
- Girls & Women's U12 County Cup
- Girls & Women's U14 County Cup
- Girls & Women's U16 County Cup

== List of Manchester Challenge Shield Winners ==
Year	Manchester Challenge Shield Winners
1934–35	Manchester North End
1935–36	Hurst
1936–37	Ashton National
1937–38	Mossley
1938–39	Hurst
1939–40	Ashton National

Year	Manchester Challenge Shield Winners
1940–41	Urmston
1941–42	Avro
1942–43	Army
1943–44	Goslings
1944–45	Ashton National

Year	Manchester Challenge Shield Winners
1945–46	Urmston
1946–47	Droylsden
1947–48	Goslings
1948–49	Mossley
1949–50	Ashton United

Year	Manchester Challenge Shield Winners
1950–51	Lancashire Steel
1951–52	Droylsden
1952–53	Ashton United
1953–54	Ashton United
1954–55	Ashton United

== List of Manchester Intermediate Challenge Cup Winners ==
(Formerly Manchester Challenge Shield)

Year	Intermediate Challenge Cup Winners
1955–56	Hyde United & Oldham Athletic
1956–57	Hyde United
1957–58	Stalybridge Celtic
1958–59	Ashton United
1959–60	Droylsden
1960–61	Mossley

Year	Intermediate Challenge Cup Winners
1961–62	Bury
1962–63	Ashton United
1963–64	Bury
1964–65	Droylsden
1965–66	Ashton United
1966–67	Mossley

Year	Intermediate Challenge Cup Winners
1967–68	Mossley
1968–69	Stalybridge Celtic
1969–70	Droylsden
1970–71	Dukinfield Town
1971–72	Curzon Ashton
1972–73	Curzon Ashton

Year	Intermediate Challenge Cup Winners
1973–74	Curzon Ashton
1974–75	Little Lever
1975–76	Maine Road
1976–77	Maine Road
1977–78	Salford Amateurs
1978–79	Salford Amateurs

== List of Manchester Premier Challenge Cup Winners ==
(Formerly Manchester Intermediate Challenge Cup)

Year	Premier Challenge Cup Winners
1979–80	Ashton United
1980–81	Droylsden
1981–82	Curzon Ashton
1982–83	Ashton United
1983–84	Curzon Ashton
1984–85	Irlam Town
1985–86	Curzon Ashton
1986–87	Curzon Ashton

Year	Premier Challenge Cup Winners
1987–88	Maine Road
1988–89	Mossley
1989–90	Curzon Ashton
1990–91	Mossley
1991–92	Ashton United
1992–93	Droylsden
1993–94	Hyde United
1994–95	Hyde United

Year	Premier Challenge Cup Winners
1995–96	Hyde United
1996–97	Glossop North End
1997–98	Glossop North End
1998–99	Hyde United
1999–2000	Droylsden
2000–01	Ashton United
2001–02	Ashton United
2002–03	Ashton United

Year	Premier Challenge Cup Winners
2003–04	Droylsden
2004–05	Hyde United
2005–06	Hyde United
2006–07	Droylsden
2007–08	Radcliffe Borough
2008–09	Droylsden
2009–10	Droylsden
2010–11	Droylsden

== List of Manchester Junior Cup Winners ==
Year	Manchester Junior Cup Winners
1887–88	Hurst Nook Rovers
1888–89	Ashton North End
1889–90	Hurst Nook Rovers
1890–91	Hurst Ramblers
1891–92	Middleton
1892–93	Middleton
1893–94	Hurst Ramblers
1894–95	Middleton
1895–96	Hadfield
1896–97	Freetown
1897–98	Hurst Ramblers
1898–99	Berrys
1899–00	Newton Heath Athletic
1900–01	Tonge
1901–02	Heywood
1902–03	Oldham Athletic
1903–04	Berrys
1904–05	Berrys
1905–06	Pendlebury
1906–07	Denton
1907–08	Eccles Borough

Year	Manchester Junior Cup Winners
1908–09	Berrys
1909–10	Alderley Edge United
1910–11	Hurst
1911–12	Hurst
1912–13	Tonge
1913–14	Northern Nomads
1914–15	Mossley
1915–19	No competition due to World War I
1919–20	New Moss Colliery
1920–21	Glossop
1921–22	Hyde United
1922–23	Droylsden
1923–24	Ashton Brothers
1924–25	Hyde United
1925–26	Ashton Brothers
1926–27	Linotype
1927–28	McMahons
1928–29	McMahons
1929–30	Linotype
1930–31	Chapel-en-le-Frith

Year	Manchester Junior Cup Winners
1931–32	Newton Heath Loco
1932–33	Hurst
1933–34	Mossley
1934–35	Denton United
1935–36	Denton United
1936–37	Glossop
1937–38	Urmston
1938–39	Urmston
1939–40	Avro
1940–41	Avro
1941–42	Goslings
1942–43	Army
1943–44	Goslings
1944–45	Range Boilers
1945–46	Goslings
1946–47	Newton Heath Loco
1947–48	Newton Heath Loco
1948–49	Glossop
1949–50	Newton Heath
1950–51	Newton Heath Loco

Year	Manchester Junior Cup Winners
1951–52	New Mills
1952–53	Newton Heath Loco
1953–54	Brindle Heath LC
1954–55	New Mills
1955–56	Avro
1956–57	Brindle Heath LC
1957–58	Cheadle Rovers
1958–59	Cheadle Rovers
1959–60	New Mills
1960–61	Cheadle Rovers
1961–62	Cheadle Rovers
1962–63	Stalybridge Celtic
1963–64	Arnfield
1964–65	New Mills
1965–66	Dukinfield Town
1966–67	Dukinfield
1967–68	Glossop
1968–69	Hyde United
1969–70	Chloride Recreation
1970–71	New Mills

== List of Manchester Challenge Trophy Winners ==
(Formerly Manchester Junior Cup)

Year	Manchester Challenge Trophy Winners
1971–72	Chadderton
1972–73	Chadderton
1973–74	Anson Villa
1974–75	Salford Amateurs
1975–76	Salford Amateurs
1976–77	North Withington
1977–78	North Withington
1978–79	GM Police
1979–80	North Withington
1980–81	Urmston Town
1981–82	Abbey Hey WMC

Year	Manchester Challenge Trophy Winners
1982–83	Maine Road
1983–84	Flixton
1984–85	Maine Road
1985–86	Maine Road
1986–87	Maine Road
1987–88	Avro
1988–89	Dukinfield Town
1989–90	ICI Blackley
1990–91	East Manchester
1991–92	East Manchester
1992–93	Wythenshawe Town

Year	Manchester Challenge Trophy Winners
1993–94	Avro
1994–95	Wythenshawe Town
1995–96	Abbey Hey
1996–97	Abbey Hey
1997–98	BICC
1998–99	Manchester University
1999–2000	Failsworth Town
2000–01	Belden
2001–02	East Manchester
2002–03	East Manchester
2003–04	Irlam MS

Year	Manchester Challenge Trophy Winners
2004–05	Trafford
2005–06	Irlam MS
2006–07	Hollinwood CC
2007–08	Blackley
2008–09	Avro
2009–10	Hollinwood CC
2010–11	Avro
2011–12	Avro
2012–13	Hyde FC Reserves (U21)
2013–14	East Manchester

== List of Manchester Amateur Cup Winners ==
Year	Manchester Amateur Cup Winners
1907–08	Old Trafford
1908–09	Cadishead Albion
1909–10	Cadishead Albion
1910–11	Old Trafford
1911–12	Longfield
1912–13	Berrys
1913–14	Berrys
1914–15	Middleton
1915–19	No competition due to WW1
1919–20	National Gas Engine
1920–21	Didsbury
1921–22	Clayton
1922–23	Acme
1923–24	Miles Platting
1924–25	McMahons
1925–26	Pendlebury
1926–27	McMahons
1927–28	Pendlebury
1928–29	N H Parish Church
1929–30	McMahons
1930–31	British Dyestuffs
1931–32	Cyclone
1932–33	Worralls
1933–34	McMahons
1934–35	Sedgeley Park
1935–36	Ferguson Pailin

Year	Manchester Amateur Cup Winners
1936–37	Audenshaw United
1937–38	Hulme Celtic
1938–39	Audenshaw United
1939–40	New Mills
1940–41	Ferguson Pailin
1941–42	Avro
1942–43	Avro
1943–44	Goslings
1944–45	Goslings
1945–46	Urmston
1946–47	Hans Renold
1947–48	Platt Brothers
1948–49	New Mills
1949–50	Hans Renold
1950–51	Hulme Lads' Club
1951–52	Hans Renold
1952–53	Walkden Yard
1953–54	Adelphi Lads' Club
1954–55	Adelphi Lads' Club
1955–56	Adelphi Lads' Club
1956–57	Adelphi Lads' Club
1957–58	Adelphi Lads' Club
1958–59	Hans Renold
1959–60	AGED
1960–61	Walkden Town
1961–62	Chloride Recreation

Year	Manchester Amateur Cup Winners
1962–63	Chloride Recreation
1963–64	Abbey Hey WMC
1964–65	Collyhurst CA
1965–66	Salford United
1966–67	Abbey Hey WMC
1967–68	Abbey Hey WMC
1968–69	Waterloo
1969–70	Milton
1970–71	Old York Victoria
1971–72	Prestwich Heys
1972–73	Maine Road
1973–74	ICI Blackley
1974–75	ICI Blackley
1975–76	ICI Blackley
1976–77	ICI Blackley
1977–78	Chamber
1978–79	Massey Ferguson
1979–80	Grasmere Rovers
1980–81	Radcliffe
1981–82	Irlam Town
1982–83	ICI Blackley
1983–84	Massey Ferguson
1984–85	ICI Blackley
1985–86	ICI Blackley
1986–87	Old York
1987–88	East Manchester

Year	Manchester Amateur Cup Winners
1988–89	ICI Blackley
1989–90	Gorton
1990–91	Heywood St James
1991–92	Bedians
1992–93	Gorton Town
1993–94
1994–95	Bedians
1995–96	Stand Athletic
1996–97	Trafford
1997–98	Maine Road
1998–99	South Manchester
1999–2000	East Manchester
2000–01	Norris Villa
2001–02	Trafford
2002–03	Heywood St James
2003–04	Trafford
2004–05	Maine Road
2005–06	East Manchester
2006–07	Maine Road
2007–08	New East Manchester
2008–09	Old Stretfordians (awarded Heywood St James)
2009–10	Dukinfield Town
2010–11

== Directors & Officials ==
=== Board of directors ===
- J Green
- D Owen (Chair)
- J McLellan-Grant (Vice Chair)
- J Craven
- C Bridgford
- C Brindley (INED)
- A Lawler (INED)
- D Treasure (INED)
- P Kay (INED)
- D O'Donoghue (INED)

=== Key Officials ===
- Colin Bridgford (Chief Executive)
- Daniel Green (Head of Participation & Development)
- Richard Cooper (Head of Business Services & Regulations)
- Lee Folkard (Participation Manager)
- Linda Meehan (Financial Controller)
