= Lancashire and Cheshire Amateur Football League =

Association football league in England

- Founded: 1909
- Country: England
- Divisions: 6
- Number of clubs: 71
- Feeder to: Manchester League; Cheshire League
- Domestic cup(s): Rhodes Cup; Wray Cup; Whitehead Cup; Hellawell Shield
- Current champions: Rushford Park (Premier Div); East Manchester Galaxy (Div 1); Moorside(Div 2); Waterhead (Div 3); Signol Athletic(Div A); Oldham Hulmeians Reserves (Div B)
- Website: landc.org.uk

The Lancashire and Cheshire Amateur Football League is an English association football league founded in 1909. As of the 2026/27 season, the league consists of six divisions – Premier, One, Two and Three, then A and B. Historically the divisions named A-D were for Reserve sides of teams in the top four divisions, but 1st teams can now play at the lower levels. In 2026/27, only A and B divisions continue to have this style of name. The Premier Division is (as of 2026/27) below the 3rd levels of the top county leagues in the area: Manchester League, Cheshire League and West Lancashire League.

== About the League ==
The Lancashire and Cheshire Amateur Football League was founded in 1909. The league, as of 2016, is the biggest of the open age Saturday afternoon men's leagues in the region, having eight Saturday divisions in operation, and a few years earlier operated with nine. Clubs are from the Greater Manchester and northern Cheshire areas. The league is overseen by the local Football Association, the Manchester FA.

The league pioneered the Respect Charter in 2002. When the FA later adopted the Respect programme, the league was a pilot League for this. The launch took place at Chorltonians FC's Police Club ground, Hough End.

One of the league's success stories are Stalybridge Celtic, who started off as an amateur football club in the league before turning professional two years later. As of summer 2022, the most recent teams to move up to the next level are Stretford Paddock, who joined the Cheshire League, Chadderton Cott and De La Salle, who joined the Manchester League for 2022/23.

In 2017, it was a record-breaking season for the Mellor club, who collected a record 5 trophies - the first team winning the Premier Division and the Rhodes Cup, the reserve team the Div 2 title and the Wray Cup, with the club also winning the Aggregate Trophy.

== Formation of the League ==
In 1909, a group of men met and in their own words decided to "Promote an Amateur League of high quality for players who pay to play the genuine sport; also to encourage competition against outside Leagues of similar outlook and standing to the mutual benefit of the amateur game." These "founding fathers" of the league included W. H. Rhodes, A. H. Downes, R. W. Lambert and E. Roscoe.

== The first season ==
The 1909–10 season saw 11 teams join the league.

League position	Team	Active in the league	1909-10 Ground	Current status (2022)
1	Walkden Amateurs	1909-1915	Edge Fold, Walkden	Folded
2	Stalybridge Celtic	1909-1911	Bower Fold, Mottram Road, Stalybridge	Northern Premier League
3	Bolton Wyresdale	1909-1910	Bolton (Note: Unknown location of ground in 1909. Current ground for the club is Inverbeg Drive, Bolton)	Lancashire Amateur League
4	Droylsden Corinthians	1909-1911	Yew Tree Farm, Copperas Lane, Droylsden	Folded
5	Lymm Amateurs	1909-1915	Rush Green, Lymm	Folded
6	Denton Corinthians	1909-1910	Denton (Note: Unknown location of the ground. References online can only be found in Manchester Grammar School from before 1909 in a newsletter referencing inter-school league games. The ground isn't noted specifically, but can be safely assumed to be somewhere in Denton)	Folded
7	Xaverian College	1909-1910	Victoria Park, Rusholme (Note: Unconfirmed if this was the address of their ground. However, the college moved to Victoria Park, 2.5 acres of grounds, in 1907 so it is likely the league games were played here)	Folded
8	Werneth Amateurs	1909-1925	Block Lane, Werneth	Folded
9	Dukinfield Astley	1909-1911	Bradley Hurst Farm, Dukinfield Hall, Dukinfield	Folded
10	Brooklands	1909-1912	Atkinson Road, Ashton-on-Mersey	Folded
11	Westinghouse	1909-1915	Warwick Road, Old Trafford	Folded

The first round of matches took place on Saturday 18 September 1909:

- Brooklands v Westinghouse
- Bolton Wyresdale v Lymm Amateurs
- Werneth Amateurs v Denton Corinthians
- Dukinfield Astley v Walkden Amateurs

The league made a profit of £19 17s at the end of the opening season. The first champions, Walkden Amateurs, finished two points clear of runners-up Stalybridge Celtic. Third place Bolton Wyresdale were seven points further behind. The league table ended with 1 game unplayed - Lymm Amateurs v Denton Corinthians. The league chairman said that Denton Corinthians "had not treated the league in a very good spirit" by not fulfilling the fixture.

After the season, Denton Corinthians disbanded, while Bolton Wyresdale moved on to the Manchester Section of the Lancashire Amateur League. Two new clubs were accepted for the following season - Nuthurst (Moston) and Manchester Simmarians. A third club was later accepted - Bolton Caledonians.

The league was said to have been so successful in its initial season, that a second division was to be launched for 1910–11.

== Clubs moving to higher status ==
A number of clubs that have left the league now play at a higher level.

Team	Active in the league	Later Leagues
Adswood Amateurs	1962-1985	1985-1987 Manchester League; Merged with Stockport Georgians in 1987
Beechfield United (Note: Played as Salford Beechfield United from 2003 to 2005)	1997-2008	2008-2022 Manchester League; Resigned 2022 (Note: After resigning from the Manchester League, the Manchester Saturday Morning League team, who were previously considered their Reserve side, has effectively become their 1st team, as their only open age side playing in 2022-23)
Boothstown	2011-2014	2014-2023 Manchester League
Bradford Parish Church; Bradford Parish; Denton Town (Note: They were called Bradford Parish Church for 1922-23 only, then played as Bradford Parish until 1994 when they were renamed Denton Town)	1922-2008	2008–present Cheshire League
Chadderton Cott	2018-2022	2022-2023 Manchester League
Cheadle Heath Nomads	1921-1925 (Note: They were inactive for 1925-26 season); 1927-1994	1994-2018 Cheshire League (Note: Merged with Linotype and played as Linotype & Cheadle Heath Nomads from 2004 to 2018. They renamed back to Cheadle Heath Nomads in 2018) (Note: The League was known as Mid-Cheshire League until 2007); 2018-2022 North West Counties League
De La Salle	2006-2007; 2020-2022	2022-2023 Manchester League
Flixton	1964-1973	1973-1986 Manchester League; 1986-1996 North West Counties League; 1996-2000 Northern Premier League; 2000-2012 North West Counties League; Folded in 2012
Govan Athletic	2002-2016	2016-2023 Manchester League (Note: Merged with University Of Manchester in 2022 and became Govan & University Of Manchester)
Irlam Steel	1993-2012	2012-2017 Manchester League; Folded in 2017
Monton Amateurs	1924-1985	1985-2022 Manchester League (Note: Resigned mid-season 2017-18 but returned for 2018-19 season. Also was set to start Div 2 in 2022-23 but resigned just before the season started) (Note: Changed name to AFC Monton in 2011)
Moorside Rangers	2006-2018	2018-2023 Manchester League
Birch Vale and Thornsett; New Mills (Note: Originally called Birch Vale and Thornsett. In 1983 they took over the ground of the New Mills side that folded and in 1984 changed their name to New Mills)	1968-1987	1987-2004 Manchester League; 2004-2011 North West Counties League; 2011-2016 Northern Premier League; 2016-2023 North West Counties League
North Withington	1958-1973	1973-2014 Manchester League (Note: North Withington changed their name to Wythenshawe Town in 1987, while in the Manchester League); 2015-2018 Cheshire League; 2018-2023 North West Counties League
Poynton	1966-1986	1986-2023 Cheshire League
Stalybridge Celtic	1909-1911	1911-1912 Lancashire Combination; 1912-1921 Central League (Note: Not including World War 1 years 1915-1919); 1914-1915 Southern League (Note: Played in both the Central League and the Southern League at the same time); 1919-1920 Lancashire Combination (Note: Played in both the Central League and the Lancashire Combination at the same time); 1921-1923 Football League Division Three North; 1923-1982 Cheshire County League (Note: Not including World War 2 years 1940-1945); 1982-1987 North West Counties League; 1987-1992 Northern Premier League; 1992-1998 Football Conference; 1998-2001 Northern Premier League; 2001-2002 Football Conference; 2002-2004 Northern Premier League; 2004-2019 National League (Note: Football Conference became National League in 2015); 2019-2023 Northern Premier League
Stand Athletic	1981-1993	1993-2001 Manchester League; 2001-2003 North West Counties League (Note: Resigned from the league midway through 2002-03 season); 2003-2009 Manchester League; Folded in 2009 (Note: Merged with Standians in summer 2009 before folding in the early stages of 2009-10)
Stretford Paddock	2020-2022	2022-2023 Cheshire League
Stockport Georgians	1931-1987	1987-2022 Manchester League (Note: Merged with Adswood Amateurs in 1987 and moved to the Manchester League, taking Adswood's place); 2022-2023 North West Counties League
Styal	1921-1923; 1927-1938; 1952-1977	1923-1927 Didn't field team 1938-1952 Unknown league 1977-2023 Cheshire League
Tintwistle Athletic	2007-2017	2017-2023 Manchester League
United Manchester Hospitals; Manchester Royal (Note: Originally called United Manchester Hospitals, and changed their name to Manchester Royal in 1988)	1978-1992	1992-2003 Manchester League; Folded in 2003 (Note: Resigned mid-season 2002-03)
West Didsbury; West Didsbury & Chorlton (Note: Joined the league as West Didsbury and changed their name to West Didsbury & Chorlton in 2003)	1920-2006	2006-2012 Manchester League; 2012-2023 North West Counties League
Whalley Range	1984-1987; 2004-2020	1987-2003 Manchester League; 2020-2023 Cheshire League
Wilmslow Albion	1973-1988	1988-1998 Mid-Cheshire League; 1998-2023 Manchester League
Woodley Athletic; Woodley Sports (Note: Joined the league as Woodley Athletic and changed their name to Woodley Sports in 1980)	1973-1988	1988-1997 Manchester League; 1997-2004 North West Counties League; 2004-2012 Northern Premier League; 2012-2015 North West Counties League; Folded in 2015 (Note: In 2012 changed name to Stockport Sports, and were expelled from the North West Counties League before the end of 2014-15 season)
Wythenshawe Amateurs	1954-1972	1972-2018 Manchester League; 2018-2023 North West Counties League

== Current members 2026-27 ==
Premier Division	Division One	Division Two	Division Three	Division A	Division B
AFC Oldham	Grappenhall Sports	Abacus Media	AFC Salford	AFC Stockport Warriors	AFC Oldham Reserves
AFC Stockport	Heywood St James Reserves	Bury Amateur	Altrincham Hale A	Bury Amateur Reserves	AFC Stockport U21
AFC Urmston Meadowside Red Star	Manchester Rovers	Didsbury	Barr Hill United	Eastside United	AFC Urmston Meadowside 1977
AR Elite	Manchester South End Reserves	Elton Fold	Boothstown	King Jonny Schmeichel	Didsbury Reserves
Bedians	Mellor	Fitton Hill Rangers	Cheadle and Gatley	Oldham Hulmeians Reserves	Didsbury Phoenix
Bollington United	Moorside	Konga	Gamesley	Richmond Rovers Reserves	Eagles Wilmslow
Chadderton Cott	Moston Brook Reserves	Milltown	Irlam Steel	Saddleworth 3Ds	Gamesley Reserves
Cheat Dave	On The Ball	Old Altrinchamians A	King Jonny Spartans	Salford Storm	King Jonny Castillas
Manchester Rose	Rochdalians	Old Stretfordians Gregorians	Moston Brook A	Santos U23	Manchester Victoria
Manchester South End	Santos	South Manchester	Newton Vikings	Spurley Hey	Moston Brook B
Oldham Hulmeians	Trafford United	Stoconians	Sale Spartans	Stoconians Reserves	Old Stretfordians Gregorians Reserves
Wythenshawe Wanderers	Village Manchester	Timperley Villa	Signol Athletic	Village Manchester Reserves	Richmond Rovers A
	Winton Wanderers	Withington Wanderers	Silver Birch	Waterhead	Saddleworth 3Ds Reserves
			Trafford United Reserves		

Note that teams sometimes officially vary their lower team names, but the above is standardising it to be clear what level it is: Reserves=2nd team, A=3rd team, B=4th team. Some teams have their 1st and 2nd teams in a higher league.

== Lancashire and Cheshire Amateur Football League winners ==
=== 1909–10 ===
The number and naming of the divisions has varied throughout the league's history, and the size of the league has grown from its early days.

Season	Division One
1909–10	Walkden Amateurs

=== 1910–14 ===
A second division (Division Two) was launched including some reserve sides from Division One.

Season	Division One	Division Two
1910–11	Stalybridge Celtic	Walkden Amateurs Reserves
1911–12	Cranford	Old Trafford St Johns Juniors
1912–13	Cranford	Refuge Assurance
1913–14	Cranford	Bramhall

=== 1919–20 ===
There was no competition 1914/15 to 1919 due to World War One. The league re-started in 1919 with a single division.

Season	Division One
1919–20	Barton Hall

=== 1920–21 ===
A second division (Division A) was launched with some reserve sides from Division One.

Season	Division One	Division A
1920–21	Chorlton Amateurs	Urmston Reserves (Note: In later records, the club was known as Urmston Victoria. They were members of the league 1914-1926)

=== 1921–26 ===
A Junior division was launched for junior players, initially defined as between 14 and 18 and a half, it was later increased up to 20 in 1924.

Season	Division One	Division A	Junior Division
1921–22	Royton Amateurs	Styal	Sale Juniors
1922–23	Royton Amateurs	Bradford Parish Church	Didsbury Juniors
1923–24	Bradford Parish (Note: Bradford Parish Church was renamed Bradford Parish in 1923)	Urmston Reserves	South Salford Lads Club
1924–25	Bramhall	South Salford (Note: South Salford Lads Club continued in the Junior Division, whilst their new Open Age side in Division A (which was mainly the previous Junior players) were called just South Salford)	Chorlton Albion
1925–26	South Salford	Mottram Amateurs	Monton Amateurs

=== 1926–27 ===
The Junior Division closed down due to problems clubs had recruiting players under 18.

Season	Division One	Division A
1926–27	South Salford (Note: Won the league with a 100% record)	Longsight

=== 1927–30 ===
A new Division Two was launched in place of Division A. Therefore, Division A would now effectively become the division for Reserves.

Season	Division One	Division Two	Division A
1927–28	South Salford (Note: Won the league after a Championship play-off with West Didsbury, winning 4-1 after extra time)	Cheadle Heath Nomads (Note: This was the original Cheadle Heath Nomads that were formed in 1919, that merged with Linotype in 2004)	Royton Amateurs Reserves
1928–29	South Salford	Chapelmoor	South Salford Reserves
1929–30	South Salford	Monton Amateurs	Union Chapel Reserves

=== 1930–31 ===
A new Junior Division was launched, and at least eight players had to be under 18.5, with up to 3 open-age players allowed. A second Reserve division "B" was also launched.

Season	Division One	Division Two	Division A	Division B	Junior Division
1930–31	South Salford	Oldham Secondary School Old Boys	South Salford Reserves	Styal Reserves	Denton Russell Scott Old Boys

=== 1931–33 ===
The Junior and B divisions were dropped after one season.

Season	Division One	Division Two	Division Three	Division A
1931–32	South Salford	Stockport Georgians	Old Urmstonians Reserves	Styal Reserves
1932–33	South Salford	Denton Russell Scott Old Boys	Old Urmstonians Reserves	Royton Amateurs Reserves

=== 1933–34 ===
Division B was re-introduced.

Season	Division One	Division Two	Division Three	Division A	Division B
1933–1934	South Salford	East Chorlton Amateurs	Birchfields	East Chorlton Amateurs Reserves	Aldermere Reserves

=== 2015–2026 ===
	Premier Division	Division One	Division Two	Division Three
2015–16	Rochdalians	Tintwistle Athletic	Whalley Range Reserves	Chorltonians Town
2016–17	Mellor	Moorside Rangers	Mellor Reserves	Didsbury Reserves
2017–18	Moorside Rangers	Waterloo	Chorltonians Reserves	Dom Doyle
2018–19	Rochdalians	Dom Doyle	Newton	Radclyffe
2019–20	cancelled/records expunged (Covid)	cancelled/records expunged (Covid)	cancelled/records expunged (Covid)	cancelled/records expunged (Covid)
2020–21	cancelled/records expunged (Covid)	cancelled/records expunged (Covid)	cancelled/records expunged (Covid)	cancelled/records expunged (Covid)
2021–22	De La Salle Reds	Chadderton Cott	Irlam Tiger Rangers	Village Manchester
2022–23	Moston Brook	Chadderton Park Sports Club	Moston Brook Reserves	Dukinfield Athletic
2023–24	Moston Brook	Hazel Grove	Bollington Health & Leisure	AFC Stockport
2024–25	Salford Victoria	Chadderton Cott	Santos	Manchester Rovers
2025–26	Rushford Park	East Manchester Galaxy	Moorside	Waterhead
