= 2002–03 North West Counties Football League =

The 2002–03 North West Counties Football League season was the 21st in the history of the North West Counties Football League, a football competition in England.

The league comprised two divisions, Division One and Division Two (at levels 8 and 9 respectively of the English football league system), and there were additionally two cup competitions: the League Challenge Cup knockout competition (known as the Worthington Challenge Trophy for sponsorship reasons) open to all the league's clubs and the Second Division Trophy, a knockout trophy competition for Division Two clubs only. The league also had a reserves team section.

== Division One ==
North West Counties Football League Division One
- Season: 2002–03
- Teams: 22
- Champions: Prescot Cables
- Promoted: Prescot Cables
- Relegated: Flixton; Winsford United
- Matches: 462
- Goals: 1,559 (3.37 per match)

Division One featured 22 clubs, 20 remaining from the previous season plus 2 additional, both promoted from Division Two:

- Alsager Town
- Squires Gate

At the end of the season the champions Prescot Cables were promoted to the Northern Premier League Division One and the bottom two clubs, Flixton and Winsford United were relegated to Division Two.

=== League table ===
Pos	Team	Pld	W	D	L	GF	GA	GD	Pts	Season End Notes
1	Prescot Cables (C, P)	42	30	6	6	110	38	+72	96	Promoted to Northern Premier League Division One
2	Clitheroe	42	28	8	6	97	38	+59	92	
3	Mossley	42	27	7	8	100	41	+59	88	
4	Newcastle Town	42	23	12	7	83	52	+31	81	
5	Skelmersdale United	42	22	8	12	91	51	+40	74	
6	Nantwich Town	42	19	11	12	90	74	+16	68	
7	St Helens Town	42	17	14	11	77	60	+17	65	
8	Congleton Town	42	19	8	15	72	62	+10	65	
9	Salford City	42	17	12	13	84	63	+21	63	
10	Fleetwood Town	42	17	9	16	73	70	+3	60	
11	Alsager Town	42	15	11	16	61	67	−6	56	
12	Squires Gate	42	13	12	17	58	71	−13	51	
13	Abbey Hey	42	12	13	17	56	73	−17	49	
14	Atherton Laburnum Rovers	42	11	12	19	65	86	−21	45	
15	Ramsbottom United	42	11	11	20	73	83	−10	44	
16	Warrington Town	42	11	11	20	48	66	−18	44	
17	Woodley Sports	42	11	9	22	62	85	−23	42	
18	Curzon Ashton	42	11	9	22	60	87	−27	42	
19	Atherton Collieries	42	11	7	24	52	85	−33	40	
20	Glossop North End	42	10	9	23	55	104	−49	39	
21	Flixton (R)	42	10	8	24	44	112	−68	38	Relegated to Division Two
22	Winsford United (R)	42	10	7	25	48	91	−43	37	Relegated to Division Two

Source: NWCFL: Final Tables, Season 2002/03
Rules for classification: 1) points; 2) goal difference; 3) number of goals scored.
(C) Champions; (P) Promoted; (R) Relegated

== Division Two ==
North West Counties Football League Division Two
- Season: 2002–03
- Teams: 18
- Champions: Bacup Borough
- Promoted: Bacup Borough; Stone Dominoes
- Relegated: None
- Matches: 306
- Goals: 1,012 (3.31 per match)

At the commencement of the season Division Two featured 19 clubs, 17 remaining from the previous season plus 2 additional, both relegated from Division One:

- Maine Road
- Great Harwood Town

However, during October 2002 Stand Athletic resigned from the league and disbanded: their record was expunged and the division reduced to 18 active clubs.

At the end of the season the champions Bacup Borough and runners-up Stone Dominoes were promoted to Division One.

=== League table ===
Pos	Team	Pld	W	D	L	GF	GA	GD	Pts	Season End Notes
1	Bacup Borough (C, P)	34	25	2	7	91	32	+59	77	Promoted to Division One
2	Stone Dominoes (P)	34	24	3	7	94	34	+60	75	Promoted to Division One
3	Maine Road	34	23	2	9	74	55	+19	71	
4	Padiham	34	20	5	9	69	42	+27	65	
5	Holker Old Boys	34	18	7	9	65	42	+23	61	
6	Great Harwood Town	34	15	7	12	64	61	+3	52	
7	Nelson	34	13	12	9	50	40	+10	51	
8	Darwen	34	14	7	13	59	64	−5	49	
9	Norton United	34	14	6	14	50	52	−2	48	
10	Colne	34	14	5	15	65	53	+12	47	
11	Ashton Town	34	12	9	13	49	53	−4	45	
12	Castleton Gabriels	34	10	8	16	43	60	−17	38	
13	Cheadle Town	34	10	8	16	39	56	−17	38	
14	Blackpool Mechanics	34	9	10	15	39	52	−13	37	
15	Leek County School Old Boys	34	8	9	17	46	57	−11	33	
16	Daisy Hill	34	7	5	22	42	93	−51	26	
17	Oldham Town	34	4	12	18	40	86	−46	24	
18	Chadderton	34	5	5	24	33	80	−47	20	
19	Stand Athletic	0	0	0	0	0	0	0	0	Resigned (Record Expunged) (Note: During October 2002 Stand Athletic resigned from the league and disbanded: their record, P12 W5 D4 L3, was expunged.)

Source: Non-League Matters: North West Counties League 2000–2011
Rules for classification: 1) points; 2) goal difference; 3) number of goals scored.
(C) Champions; (P) Promoted

== League Challenge Cup ==
The 2002–03 League Challenge Cup (known as the Worthington Challenge Trophy for sponsorship reasons) was a knockout competition open to all the league's clubs. The all Division One club final, played at Bury F.C., was won 2–1 by Mossley who defeated Clitheroe.

Quarter-finals, Semi-finals and Final

(The semi-finals were decided on aggregate score from two legs played)

Quarter-finals
Clitheroe (D1)	3
Skelmersdale United (D1)	1
Padiham (D2)	2
Congleton Town (D1)	1
Salford City (D1)	2
Mossley (D1)	4
Ramsbottom United (D1)	2
Newcastle Town (D1)	4

Semi-finals
Clitheroe (D1)	4	1	5
Padiham (D2)	1	1	2
Mossley (D1)	4	1	5
Newcastle Town (D1)	1	2	3

Final (Note: Played at Bury F.C.)
Clitheroe (D1)	1
Mossley (D1)	2

Club's division appended to team name: (D1)=Division One; (D2)=Division Two
sources:

- Quarter-finals and Semi-finals: "Worthington Challenge Trophy Sponsored by Coors Brewery". nwcfl.co.uk. March 2003. Archived from the original on 29 April 2003.
- Final: "Disappointing Blues fail to rise to occasion". The Clitheroe Advertiser and Times. Clitheroe. 15 May 2003. p. 38.

== Second Division Trophy ==
The 2002–03 Second Division Trophy was a knockout competition for Division Two clubs only. The winners, in the final played at Congleton Town F.C., were Stone Dominoes who defeated Ashton Town 2–1.

Semi-finals and Final

Semi-finals
Oldham Town	0
Ashton Town	3
Stone Dominoes	6
Bacup Borough	0

Final (Note: Played at Congleton Town F.C.)
Ashton Town	1
Stone Dominoes	2

sources:

- Semi-finals: "Division Two Trophy". nwcfl.co.uk. March 2003. Archived from the original on 26 April 2003.
- Final: "Ashton Town lose trophy final in tense clash". Wigan Observer. Wigan. 15 May 2003. p. 69.

== Reserves Section ==
Main honours for the 2002–03 season:

- Reserves Division
  - Winners: Padiham Reserves
  - Runners-up: Skelmersdale United Reserves
- Reserves Division Cup
  - Winners: Skelmersdale United Reserves
  - Runners-up: Daisy Hill Reserves
