= Herbert Dale =

English footballer

Herbert Dale (January 1867 – December 1925) was an English footballer who played as a forward. Born in Stoke on Trent, Staffordshire, he played for Newton Heath and made an appearance for the Manchester FA representative side.
