= 2001–02 North West Counties Football League =

The 2001–02 North West Counties Football League season was the 20th in the history of the North West Counties Football League, a football competition in England.

The league comprised two divisions, Division One and Division Two (at levels 8 and 9 respectively of the English football league system), and there was additionally a single cup competition, the League Challenge Cup knockout competition (known as the Worthington Challenge Trophy for sponsorship reasons) open to all the league's clubs (the Second Division Trophy competition was not contested this season). The league also had a reserves team section.

== Division One ==
North West Counties Football League Division One
- Season: 2001–02
- Teams: 23
- Champions: Kidsgrove Athletic
- Promoted: Kidsgrove Athletic
- Relegated: Great Harwood Town; Maine Road
- Matches: 506
- Goals: 1,763 (3.48 per match)

Division One featured 23 clubs, 19 remaining from the previous season plus 4 additions:

- Atherton Laburnum Rovers, promoted from third place in Division Two
- Congleton Town, relegated from the Northern Premier League Division One
- Winsford United, relegated from the Northern Premier League Division One
- Warrington Town, promoted as champions of Division Two

At the end of the season the champions Kidsgrove Athletic were promoted to the Northern Premier League Division One and the bottom two clubs, Maine Road and Great Harwood Town, were relegated to Division Two. Over this season the divisional record of goals scored per match of 3.42 (established in the 1994–95 season) was extended marginally to 3.48 goals per match.

=== League table ===
Pos	Team	Pld	W	D	L	GF	GA	GD	Pts	Season End Notes
1	Kidsgrove Athletic (C, P)	44	31	9	4	125	47	+78	102	Promoted to Northern Premier; League Division One
2	Prescot Cables	44	29	10	5	110	42	+68	97	
3	Salford City	44	29	10	5	91	40	+51	97	
4	St Helens Town	44	28	6	10	101	44	+57	90	
5	Newcastle Town	44	22	11	11	97	66	+31	77	
6	Clitheroe	44	22	10	12	73	53	+20	76	
7	Winsford United	44	19	12	13	72	71	+1	69	
8	Mossley	44	18	14	12	82	63	+19	68	
9	Skelmersdale United	44	19	5	20	87	89	−2	62	
10	Woodley Sports	44	16	12	16	58	65	−7	60	
11	Warrington Town	44	16	11	17	78	72	+6	59	
12	Ramsbottom United	44	15	10	19	75	73	+2	55	
13	Curzon Ashton	44	16	7	21	74	72	+2	55	
14	Fleetwood Freeport	44	13	13	18	70	86	−16	52	
15	Nantwich Town	44	12	15	17	63	90	−27	51	
16	Congleton Town	44	13	11	20	71	79	−8	50	
17	Atherton Collieries	44	13	8	23	66	91	−25	47	
18	Abbey Hey	44	12	11	21	62	101	−39	47	
19	Glossop North End	44	13	7	24	78	105	−27	46	
20	Atherton Laburnum Rovers	44	11	11	22	62	88	−26	44	
21	Flixton	44	11	9	24	61	112	−51	42	
22	Maine Road (R)	44	8	7	29	68	115	−47	31	Relegated to Division Two
23	Great Harwood Town (R)	44	5	11	28	39	99	−60	26	Relegated to Division Two

Source: NWCFL: Final Tables, Season 2001/02
Rules for classification: 1) points; 2) goal difference; 3) number of goals scored.
(C) Champions; (P) Promoted; (R) Relegated

== Division Two ==
North West Counties Football League Division Two
- Season: 2001–02
- Teams: 21
- Champions: Stand Athletic
- Promoted: Alsager Town; Squires Gate
- Relegated: None
- Matches: 420
- Goals: 1,437 (3.42 per match)

Division Two featured 21 clubs, 17 remaining from the previous season plus 4 additions:

- Cheadle Town, relegated from Division One
- Leek CSOB, relegated from Division One
- Norton United, promoted as champions of the Midland Football League
- Stand Athletic, promoted as champions of the Manchester League

At the end of the season champions Stand Athletic were denied promotion as their ground was deemed unacceptable for Division One; consequently the promotion places were taken by runners-up Alsager Town and third placed Squires Gate. Also leaving the division (and subsequently joining the Liverpool County Combination) were Formby and Bootle – both expelled as their ground facilities were below the division's required standard.

=== League table ===
Pos	Team	Pld	W	D	L	GF	GA	GD	Pts	Season End Notes
1	Stand Athletic (C)	40	30	5	5	110	47	+63	95	
2	Alsager Town (P)	40	24	9	7	77	31	+46	81	Promoted to Division One
3	Squires Gate (P)	40	24	9	7	103	60	+43	81	Promoted to Division One
4	Stone Dominoes	40	25	3	12	71	40	+31	78	
5	Formby	40	21	14	5	76	39	+37	77	Expelled (ground substandard)
6	Bootle	40	19	7	14	82	64	+18	64	Expelled (ground substandard)
7	Norton United	40	19	7	14	56	51	+5	64	
8	Blackpool Mechanics	40	18	9	13	69	48	+21	63	
9	Nelson	40	18	9	13	73	63	+10	63	
10	Leek County School Old Boys	40	17	8	15	62	65	−3	59	
11	Darwen	40	15	10	15	77	73	+4	55	
12	Bacup Borough	40	13	13	14	52	66	−14	52	
13	Padiham	40	14	8	18	69	66	+3	50	
14	Colne	40	14	8	18	61	72	−11	50	
15	Chadderton	40	15	5	20	65	81	−16	50	
16	Ashton Town	40	13	6	21	65	85	−20	45	
17	Cheadle Town	40	10	8	22	66	85	−19	38	
18	Castleton Gabriels	40	10	3	27	61	95	−34	33	
19	Holker Old Boys	40	7	9	24	43	79	−36	30	
20	Daisy Hill	40	8	4	28	49	114	−65	28	
21	Oldham Town	40	7	4	29	50	113	−63	25	

Source: NWCFL: Final Tables, Season 2001/02
Rules for classification: 1) points; 2) goal difference; 3) number of goals scored.
(C) Champions; (P) Promoted

== League Challenge Cup ==
The 2001–02 League Challenge Cup (known as the Worthington Challenge Trophy for sponsorship reasons) was a knockout competition open to all the league's clubs. The all Division One club final, played at Bury F.C., was won by Prescot Cables who defeated Atherton Collieries 4–2.

Semi-finals and Final

The semi-finals were decided on aggregate score from two legs played

Semi-finals
Kidsgrove Athletic (D1)	2	0	2
Atherton Collieries (D1)	3	1	4
St Helens Town (D1)	0	2	2
Prescot Cables (D1)	2	1	3

Final (Note: Played at Bury F.C.)
Atherton Collieries (D1)	2
Prescot Cables (D1)	4

Club's division appended to team name: (D1)=Division One
sources:

- Semi-finals: "Football Results and League Tables: North West Counties League: Semi Finals Challenge Cup First Legs". The Gazette. Blackpool. 18 March 2002. p. 31.; "Football Results and League Tables: North West Counties League: Semi Finals Challenge Cup". The Gazette. Blackpool. 25 March 2002. p. 30.
- Final: "Colls finshed off". Lancashire Telegraph. 22 April 2002.

== Reserves Section ==
Main honours for the 2001–02 season:

- Reserves Division
  - Winners: Woodley Sports Reserves
  - Runners-up: Skelmersdale United Reserves
- Reserves Division Cup
  - Winners: Woodley Sports Reserves
  - Runners-up: Maine Road Reserves
