= 2000–01 Northern Premier League =

The 2000–01 Northern Premier League season was the 33rd in the history of the Northern Premier League, a football competition in England. Teams were divided into two divisions; the Premier and the First.

== Premier Division ==
Northern Premier League Premier Division
- Season: 2000–01
- Champions: Stalybridge Celtic
- Promoted: Stalybridge Celtic
- Relegated: Leek Town; Spennymoor United
- Matches: 506
- Goals: 1,553 (3.07 per match)

The Premier Division featured three new teams:

- Altrincham relegated from the Football Conference
- Accrington Stanley promoted as champions of Division One
- Burscough promoted as runners-up of Division One

=== League table ===
Pos	Team	Pld	W	D	L	GF	GA	GD	Pts	Promotion or relegation
1	Stalybridge Celtic (C, P)	44	31	9	4	96	32	+64	102	Promotion to Football Conference
2	Emley	44	31	8	5	87	42	+45	101	
3	Bishop Auckland	44	26	7	11	88	53	+35	85	
4	Lancaster City	44	24	9	11	84	60	+24	81	
5	Worksop Town	44	20	13	11	102	60	+42	73	
6	Barrow	44	21	9	14	83	63	+20	72	
7	Altrincham	44	20	10	14	80	57	+23	70	
8	Gainsborough Trinity	44	17	14	13	59	56	+3	65	
9	Accrington Stanley	44	18	10	16	71	67	+4	64	
10	Hucknall Town	44	17	12	15	57	63	−6	63	
11	Gateshead	44	16	12	16	68	61	+7	60	
12	Bamber Bridge	44	17	8	19	63	65	−2	59	
13	Runcorn	44	15	10	19	56	70	−14	55	
14	Blyth Spartans	44	15	9	20	61	64	−3	54	
15	Burscough	44	14	10	20	59	68	−9	52	
16	Hyde United	44	13	12	19	72	79	−7	51	
17	Whitby Town	44	13	11	20	60	76	−16	50	
18	Marine	44	12	13	19	62	78	−16	49	
19	Colwyn Bay	44	12	10	22	68	102	−34	46	
20	Frickley Athletic	44	10	15	19	50	79	−29	45	
21	Droylsden	44	13	6	25	50	80	−30	45	
22	Leek Town (R)	44	12	8	24	45	70	−25	44	Relegation to NPL Division One
23	Spennymoor United (R)	44	4	5	35	32	108	−76	16 (Note: Spennymoor United were docked 1 point)	Relegation to NPL Division One

Updated to match(es) played on 5 May 2001. Source:
Rules for classification: 1) points; 2) goal difference; 3) number of goals scored.
(C) Champions; (P) Promoted; (R) Relegated

=== Results ===
Home \ Away	ACC	ALT	BAM	BRW	BIS	BLY	BUR	COL	DRO	EML	FRK	GAI	GAT	HUC	HYD	LNC	LEE	MAR	RUN	SPU	STL	WTB	WKS
Accrington Stanley		2–1	1–3	2–1	3–1	3–3	2–0	2–2	3–0	3–1	1–1	1–1	3–1	1–2	4–1	1–2	2–1	3–2	2–1	1–0	1–4	0–2	3–4
Altrincham	5–2		1–2	1–1	0–2	3–1	2–2	3–0	3–0	0–2	3–1	0–2	3–2	1–0	2–0	3–1	1–1	3–1	2–1	5–0	0–0	3–1	1–2
Bamber Bridge	3–0	1–1		1–2	0–2	1–3	0–1	3–4	2–1	1–1	0–1	2–0	4–2	1–3	2–1	1–4	1–0	2–0	3–1	0–0	0–2	5–0	1–2
Barrow	3–0	2–3	3–1		1–4	2–0	2–2	3–2	2–0	1–3	2–0	3–2	3–1	5–0	1–0	2–2	3–0	1–0	1–2	5–0	0–0	2–3	2–1
Bishop Auckland	2–1	2–0	5–2	2–2		1–0	4–0	5–1	2–1	1–3	2–0	3–1	0–1	2–0	3–1	1–3	3–1	1–1	0–2	2–0	0–2	2–1	2–1
Blyth Spartans	1–0	1–1	0–0	1–1	1–2		1–0	5–2	0–1	2–1	3–0	1–0	2–1	1–1	0–0	0–1	0–0	4–1	3–0	0–1	1–2	0–2	1–0
Burscough	0–0	3–1	3–0	1–2	2–1	3–1		1–2	3–1	0–1	1–2	1–1	0–1	2–1	1–0	2–3	1–0	1–3	0–0	4–1	1–1	2–3	2–2
Colwyn Bay	2–4	1–2	1–1	2–0	3–3	1–0	4–1		3–2	0–4	0–0	3–3	2–2	0–2	2–1	1–2	4–1	2–3	2–2	3–2	1–7	2–1	3–2
Droylsden	0–4	2–1	0–1	2–1	0–3	1–2	1–2	1–0		1–3	1–1	4–0	0–0	1–1	2–4	3–2	1–0	2–3	0–2	4–1	0–1	1–3	2–5
Emley	1–0	3–1	1–0	0–0	3–1	1–0	2–1	4–1	2–1		0–0	1–0	2–0	0–0	3–1	1–0	1–1	3–2	2–1	3–3	2–3	4–0	5–3
Frickley Athletic	0–2	3–3	1–2	3–2	0–1	4–2	1–0	6–2	1–1	1–3		2–2	1–0	1–2	1–1	0–0	1–3	0–1	1–1	2–0	0–0	1–1	1–5
Gainsborough Trinity	2–0	1–0	2–0	2–0	0–0	4–2	2–1	1–0	0–1	3–2	2–2		0–2	1–1	2–1	1–1	4–1	2–0	2–0	2–1	0–0	1–3	1–1
Gateshead	0–0	2–1	0–2	1–2	0–3	2–5	1–1	4–2	1–1	0–1	5–0	1–1		1–2	3–0	1–0	2–1	3–0	5–1	4–0	2–2	1–1	0–0
Hucknall Town	2–0	1–3	1–0	1–4	2–5	4–1	3–2	1–0	1–2	0–2	3–1	1–0	2–2		1–2	3–1	2–0	1–1	1–0	1–0	2–2	0–1	1–1
Hyde United	3–3	4–2	1–4	4–4	1–1	6–2	1–1	1–1	3–2	1–2	0–0	0–1	3–1	5–1		1–1	2–1	2–1	1–1	4–0	1–2	3–2	1–3
Lancaster City	1–1	4–1	3–2	1–1	1–0	1–1	5–2	1–0	0–2	3–3	0–1	2–1	2–0	4–1	1–4		3–2	3–1	3–1	2–0	3–2	3–1	2–0
Leek Town	0–2	0–0	1–1	2–1	3–1	0–4	4–0	2–4	1–1	0–1	2–1	1–0	1–2	0–0	2–0	0–2		2–2	2–1	3–1	0–2	0–1	0–3
Marine	1–1	0–4	2–1	1–2	1–3	1–1	3–5	2–0	1–0	0–2	1–0	2–2	1–1	1–1	1–1	1–1	2–0		4–1	1–0	0–3	4–1	0–1
Runcorn	2–0	0–2	2–3	3–1	4–4	1–0	2–0	1–0	3–1	1–1	2–1	1–1	1–2	2–1	1–1	1–0	0–1	2–2		2–0	2–1	2–1	0–4
Spennymoor United	1–6	0–4	1–2	2–3	0–3	1–2	0–2	1–1	0–1	0–2	0–5	0–3	1–4	0–1	3–0	0–3	2–0	2–2	2–0		0–1	1–2	0–1
Stalybridge Celtic	4–0	1–0	3–0	1–0	2–0	2–0	0–2	4–0	4–1	4–2	3–0	7–1	2–1	1–0	3–1	5–0	1–2	2–1	3–1	3–2		1–1	1–0
Whitby Town	0–0	2–2	1–1	0–2	1–1	1–0	0–2	5–1	0–1	0–1	2–2	0–1	0–1	2–2	1–3	1–5	1–2	3–2	3–1	3–3	0–1		1–1
Worksop Town	0–2	1–2	1–1	4–2	1–2	4–3	1–0	1–1	5–0	1–2	12–0	1–1	2–2	1–1	4–1	4–2	3–1	3–3	1–1	6–0	1–1	3–2	

Updated to match(es) played on 5 May 2001. Source: Northern Premier Division results grid
Legend: Blue = home team win; Yellow = draw; Red = away team win.

== Division One ==
Northern Premier League Division One
- Season: 2000–01
- Champions: Bradford Park Avenue
- Promoted: Bradford Park Avenue; Vauxhall Motors
- Relegated: Congleton Town; Winsford United
- Matches: 462
- Goals: 1,423 (3.08 per match)

Division One featured four new teams:

- Guiseley relegated from the Premier Division
- Winsford United relegated from the Premier Division
- North Ferriby United promoted as champions of the Northern Counties East League Premier Division
- Vauxhall Motors promoted as champions of the North West Counties League Division One

=== League table ===
Pos	Team	Pld	W	D	L	GF	GA	GD	Pts	Promotion or relegation
1	Bradford Park Avenue (C, P)	42	28	5	9	83	40	+43	89	Promotion to Premier Division
2	Vauxhall Motors (P)	42	23	10	9	95	50	+45	79	Promotion to Premier Division
3	Ashton United	42	23	9	10	91	49	+42	78	
4	Stocksbridge Park Steels	42	19	13	10	80	60	+20	70	
5	Trafford	42	20	9	13	70	62	+8	68 (Note: Trafford were docked 1 point.)	
6	Belper Town	42	18	11	13	71	62	+9	65	
7	Witton Albion	42	15	16	11	51	50	+1	61	
8	Ossett Town	42	16	12	14	66	58	+8	60	
9	Radcliffe Borough	42	17	8	17	72	71	+1	59	
10	Chorley	42	15	14	13	71	70	+1	59	
11	Harrogate Town	42	15	10	17	60	70	−10	55	
12	Matlock Town	42	14	10	18	70	74	−4	52	
13	North Ferriby United	42	14	10	18	64	73	−9	52	
14	Workington	42	13	12	17	53	60	−7	51	
15	Lincoln United	42	13	12	17	60	75	−15	51	
16	Gretna	42	12	12	18	72	82	−10	48	
17	Guiseley	42	11	15	16	37	50	−13	48	
18	Kendal Town	42	12	12	18	60	69	−9	47 (Note: From this season onwards Netherfield Kendal were known as Kendal Town. They were docked 1 point during the season.)	
19	Farsley Celtic	42	12	11	19	53	71	−18	47	
20	Eastwood Town	42	13	8	21	40	63	−23	47	
21	Winsford United (R)	42	13	11	18	61	70	−9	44 (Note: Winsford United were docked 6 points.)	Relegation to NWCFL Division One
22	Congleton Town (R)	42	8	6	28	43	94	−51	30	Relegation to NWCFL Division One

Updated to match(es) played on 8 February 2011. Source:
Rules for classification: 1) points; 2) goal difference; 3) number of goals scored.
(C) Champions; (P) Promoted; (R) Relegated

=== Results ===
Home \ Away	ASH	BLP	BPA	CHO	CNG	EAS	FAR	GRT	GUI	HAR	KEN	LIN	MAT	NFU	OST	RAD	STO	TRA	VAU	WNS	WTN	WRK
Ashton United		3–4	0–2	7–3	4–1	0–2	1–0	9–2	0–0	4–1	8–1	3–1	2–2	0–0	1–1	3–0	3–2	0–0	2–0	1–0	0–0	2–1
Belper Town	0–4		0–2	1–1	3–1	4–0	2–2	0–0	1–1	1–1	3–2	3–1	3–1	2–2	0–1	4–6	1–2	0–2	1–1	4–1	2–1	2–0
Bradford Park Avenue	1–2	2–1		1–1	1–2	4–1	3–0	2–2	3–0	4–2	4–0	2–0	0–2	2–1	3–2	0–1	1–0	1–0	0–1	4–0	4–1	1–0
Chorley	2–1	1–1	2–1		1–1	3–1	1–4	2–2	1–1	1–0	2–2	8–1	1–1	3–2	1–1	3–3	0–1	0–3	5–5	2–0	0–1	1–2
Congleton Town	0–1	1–4	0–2	2–4		2–0	1–3	2–1	3–1	1–3	2–0	0–0	2–1	1–4	2–1	0–1	0–3	2–6	0–2	1–2	2–2	0–3
Eastwood Town	2–1	0–0	0–1	0–2	1–0		1–1	4–1	0–1	0–2	2–0	0–0	0–4	3–1	0–2	2–1	0–2	2–2	0–4	1–0	1–2	2–2
Farsley Celtic	0–3	2–3	0–3	0–1	1–0	0–0		2–0	0–1	1–1	1–2	3–1	1–2	1–1	3–2	1–3	1–2	1–0	1–2	2–3	3–0	2–1
Gretna	1–1	1–2	0–1	0–2	5–1	0–1	3–3		1–1	2–0	4–3	2–3	2–0	5–4	1–0	3–2	1–1	7–1	1–2	1–1	1–2	1–2
Guiseley	1–2	1–1	0–0	0–1	0–1	0–2	1–1	0–0		1–0	0–0	3–2	0–4	1–1	0–3	4–1	1–1	0–1	1–1	3–0	1–0	1–0
Harrogate Town	3–2	3–1	1–2	3–0	5–1	3–0	0–3	2–2	1–1		0–3	5–0	2–1	1–0	0–4	2–2	1–1	4–1	1–2	2–2	0–2	0–0
Kendal Town	4–3	2–2	0–1	3–0	4–0	1–1	0–2	0–1	1–1	0–0		1–0	2–0	2–2	2–2	1–0	3–2	1–2	3–1	1–2	2–2	2–0
Lincoln United	1–2	1–0	2–2	1–4	2–1	1–0	2–0	3–1	3–1	0–1	1–0		0–1	2–1	1–0	2–0	1–2	2–2	4–4	1–1	3–0	2–2
Matlock Town	0–1	3–2	1–5	0–3	4–2	0–4	2–2	7–0	2–0	3–1	3–3	2–1		2–2	1–0	3–2	1–2	1–4	0–3	1–2	2–2	2–2
North Ferriby United	1–3	1–2	2–1	0–3	2–1	2–0	2–1	2–6	1–0	4–1	2–2	3–1	2–1		2–0	1–2	2–2	1–3	3–2	0–3	0–2	0–1
Ossett Town	0–3	3–0	1–1	3–3	1–1	2–0	2–0	0–0	2–1	1–2	2–1	1–2	1–0	0–3		5–2	1–1	3–1	1–3	3–2	0–0	2–1
Radcliffe Borough	2–3	1–2	1–2	3–2	3–1	1–0	0–1	2–1	0–1	3–0	1–0	2–2	1–1	4–0	5–6		1–1	2–0	1–0	1–2	0–0	4–2
Stocksbridge Park Steels	2–2	0–4	0–3	2–2	3–1	4–1	6–0	4–1	4–2	0–0	2–1	3–3	3–2	0–2	3–3	1–2		1–2	1–0	2–1	5–2	1–1
Trafford	3–1	1–0	1–3	1–0	2–0	0–1	2–2	1–0	1–1	4–1	2–2	1–0	1–2	1–1	2–1	2–2	3–1		2–1	3–1	2–1	1–4
Vauxhall Motors	0–2	3–1	2–0	5–0	3–0	1–1	4–0	3–2	3–0	8–1	1–0	2–2	3–2	0–1	2–2	1–1	1–2	4–2		2–0	1–1	4–0
Winsford United	1–0	1–2	1–2	2–0	2–2	2–3	5–0	3–3	0–3	2–0	1–3	2–2	4–1	1–1	0–0	1–2	0–3	3–2	2–2		0–0	2–2
Witton Albion	1–1	0–1	5–2	0–0	0–0	3–1	0–0	1–4	1–0	0–1	2–0	2–1	2–2	1–0	2–0	3–1	1–1	2–0	1–4	1–0		1–1
Workington	2–0	0–1	2–5	2–0	3–2	1–0	2–2	0–1	0–1	0–3	2–0	2–2	0–0	4–2	0–1	2–0	2–1	0–0	0–2	1–3	1–1	

Updated to match(es) played on 5 May 2001. Source: Northern Premier League First Division results grid
Legend: Blue = home team win; Yellow = draw; Red = away team win.

== Promotion and relegation ==
In the thirty-third season of the Northern Premier League Stalybridge Celtic (as champions) were automatically promoted to the Football Conference. Leek Town and Spennymoor United were relegated to the First Division; these two clubs were replaced by First Division winners Bradford Park Avenue, second placed Vauxhall Motors and readmitted Burton Albion (returning from the Southern League Premier Division. In the First Division Winsford United and Congleton Town left the League at the end of the season and were replaced by newly admitted Rossendale United and Ossett Albion.

== Cup Results ==
Challenge Cup: Teams from both leagues.

- Lancaster City bt. Bishop Auckland

President's Cup: 'Plate' competition for losing teams in the NPL Cup.

- Stalybridge Celtic bt. Blyth Spartans

Chairman's Cup: 'Plate' competition for losing teams in the NPL Cup.

- Barrow bt. Harrogate Town

Peter Swales Shield: Between Champions of NPL Premier Division and Winners of the NPL Cup.

- Stalybridge Celtic bt. Lancaster City
