= Haslingden F.C. (1969) =

English football club in Rossendale, Lancashire

- Nicknames: Hassy, the Tangerines
- Founded: 1969
- Dissolved: 1998
- Ground: Ewood Bridge
Home colours

Haslingden F.C. was a football club based in Rossendale, Lancashire.

== History ==
The club was founded in 1969. In 1994, they won the North West Counties Football League Division Two. Haslingden played at Ewood Bridge, later used by Stand Athletic, and were members of the North West Counties League between 1993 and 1998. Although Division Two Champions in their first season Haslingden were not promoted until finishing runners up in 1997.

The club completed just one season in the top flight, finishing 16th out of 22, before financial difficulties caused the club to dissolve. Haslingden's final match was a 3–2 win over League champions Kidsgrove Athletic on 4 May 1998, Lloyd Green scoring the winning goal.

The town of Haslingden is today represented by Haslingden St.Mary's F.C. of the West Lancashire Football League. The club play at South Shore Street close to Haslingden town centre.

== Honours ==
- North West Counties Football League Division Two
  - Champions 1993–94
  - Runners-up 1996–97
- Lancashire Combination Division Two
  - Champions 1910–11
- West Lancashire League Division Two
  - Runners-up 1992–93

== See also ==
- Stand Athletic F.C.
