= Stand Athletic F.C. =

- Founded: 1964
- Dissolved: 2009
- Ground: Green Lane
- 2008–09: Manchester Football League Division One, 4th
Home colours

Stand Athletic F.C. was a football club based in Whitefield, Greater Manchester, England.

== History ==
The club was founded in 1964 and played at Elms Park in Whitefield from 1969. The club was originally in the Bury Sunday School League. In 1970 they were accepted into the South East Lancashire League, where they became a very successful club.

The club ran two teams, was managed by Harry Molineux, with John Roebuck as Secretary, and assisted by Warren Derbyshire as coach until 1973. A regular player Tom Edwards then took over as Manager In 1981 they joined the Lancashire and Cheshire Amateur League and won Division Two in 1982–83. In 1993, they joined the Manchester League.

In 2000, the club moved from Whitefield to the Ewood Bridge ground formerly used by Haslingden F.C. on a seven-year lease but financial difficulties meant that they returned to Whitefield after two years. The club secretary said that "We were successful on the pitch but not off it. It's a large site and it could be a great opportunity for someone". They joined the North West Counties League in 2001. In their first season at the higher level, they won the Division Two title, but were not accepted for promotion to Division One due to issues with this new ground.

After 12 matches of the 2002–03 season, they resigned from the North West Counties League, and rejoined the Manchester League for 2003–04. They finished fourth in the Manchester League Division One in 2008–09 and had also fielded a team in Division Three. They were forced to leave the Elms Park site in the summer of 2008 when the local council closed the changing facilities, which were used by various local sports teams.

The club played one season at Agecroft in Salford and then, in the summer of 2009, merged with another local club, called Standians F.C., that was to be managed by former Bury F.C. striker Kevin Hulme. The new arrangements were fractious, with on-field brawls in pre-season training, and the merged club resigned from the Manchester League. A team calling itself Standians F.C., comprising mostly players from the former club of that name, went on to play in the Lancashire and Cheshire League for the 2009–10 season, leading to accusations from the Athletic coach that his players had been "stabbed in the back", although he did acknowledge that there were disciplinary problems.

== Colours ==
The club's home kit was yellow and black stripes.

== Ground ==
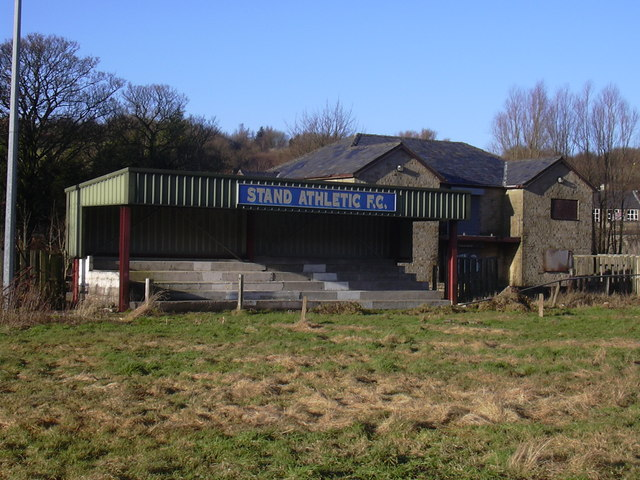
The club's overgrown ground in January 2009.

The club's overgrown pitch and dilapidated home supporters' stand at Ewood Bridge can be seen from the East Lancashire Railway, close to the Irwell Vale railway station. The ground is located just off Blackburn Road (B6527) between the railway line and the River Irwell.

The ground included a match pitch, a synthetic training pitch, a two-story clubhouse with changing rooms, a function room and bar, and a stand.

== Honours ==
- North West Counties Football League Division Two
  - Champions 2001–02
- Manchester League Premier Division
  - Champions 1998–99, 1999–2000, 2000–01
- Manchester League Division One
  - Champions 1995–96
