= Prestwich Heys A.F.C. =

Association football club in Greater Manchester, England

Coordinates: 53°32′40″N 2°16′23″W

Prestwich Heys (previously Heys Old Boys)
- Full name: Prestwich Heys Amateur Football Club
- Nickname: The Heys
- Founded: 1938 (Heys Old Boys) 1964 (Prestwich Heys)
- Ground: Adie Moran Park, Prestwich
- Chairman: Jonathan Lyons
- Manager: Ryan Hutchinson
- League: North West Counties League Premier Division
- 2024–25: North West Counties League Premier Division, 22nd of 24
Home colours	Away colours

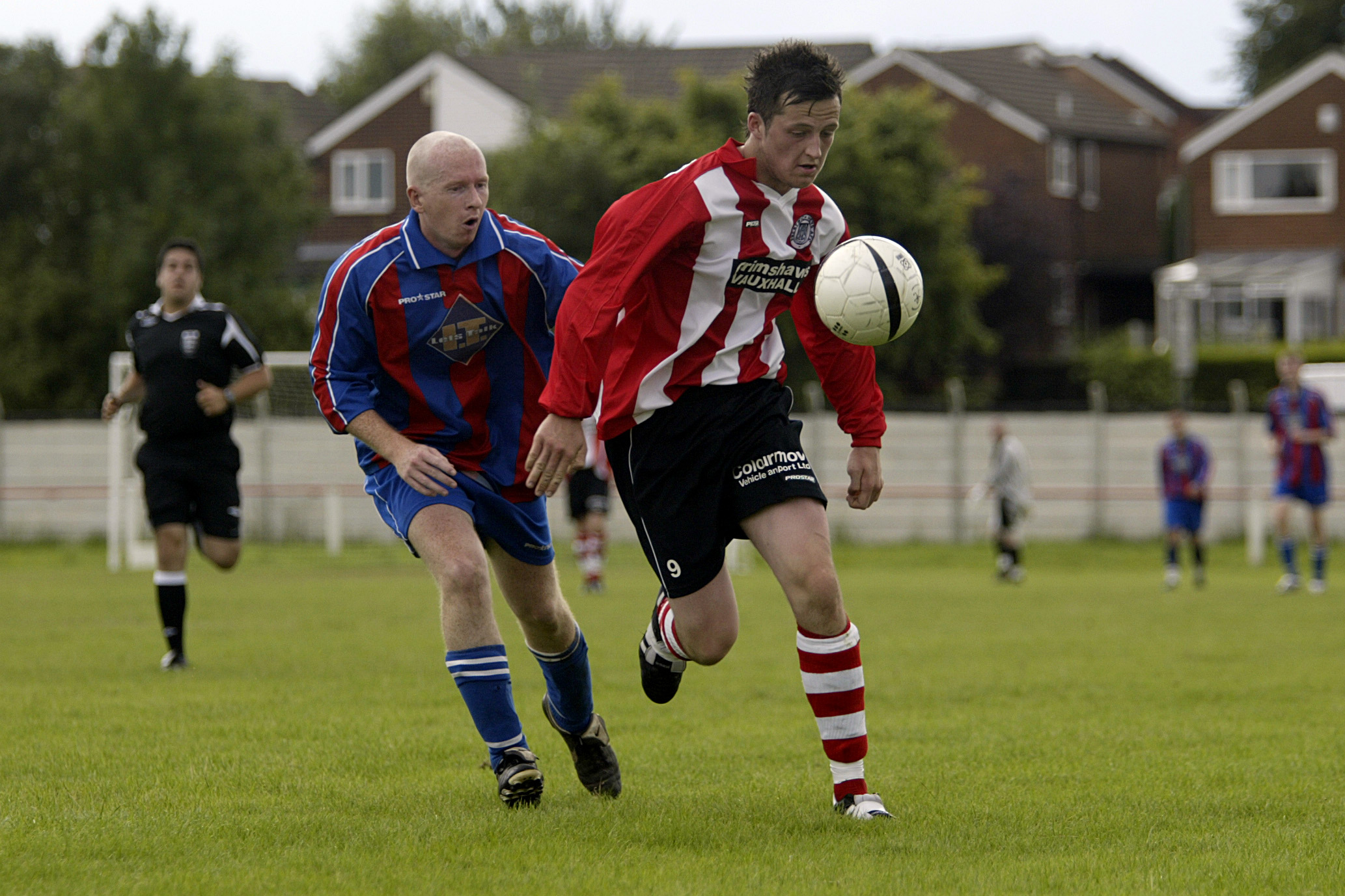
Prestwich Heys match action 2008–09 season

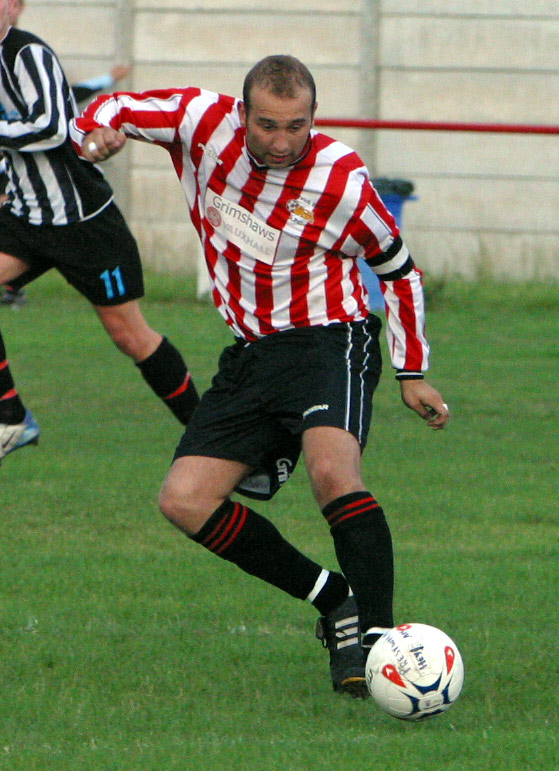
Former skipper Lee Connell in action for Heys in 2006

Prestwich Heys A.F.C. is a semi-professional football club based in Prestwich, Greater Manchester, England. It was formerly an amateur team called Heys Old Boys, being made up of former pupils of a school on Heys Road.

Heys run one senior side competing in the North West Counties League Premier Division. An U21s youth team began playing in the North West Under 21 Development League in the 2025-26 season.

== League history ==
- 1968–69 – Joined the Lancashire Combination
- 1969–70 – Lancashire Combination Runners-Up
- 1970–71 – Lancashire Combination Champions
- 1971–72 – Joined the Cheshire County League
- 1978–79 – Dropped down to become founder members of Division Two
- 1982–83 – Founder Members of the North West Counties League
- 1985–86 – Final season in the North West Counties League
- 1986–87 – Joined the Manchester Football League Division One
- 1987–88 – Manchester Football League Division One Champions
- 1987–88 – Promoted to the Premier Division
- 1995–96 – Relegated to Division One
- 1996–97 – Manchester Football League Division One Champions
- 1996–97 – Promoted to the Premier Division
- 2003–04 – Premier Division Runners-Up
- 2004–05 – Premier Division Champions
- 2005–06 – Premier Division Champions
- 2006–07 – Premier Division Champions
- 2015–16 – Premier Division Champions
- 2016–17 – Joined North West Counties League Division One
- 2021-22 – Promoted to the Premier Division

== Records ==
League Positions:
1st in the Lancashire Combination 1970–71
4th in the North West Counties League Division Three 1982–83
1st in the Manchester Football League Premier Division 2004–05, 2005–06, 2006–07 and 2015–16

FA Cup:
Second round qualifying v Mossley 1973–74 (lost 3–2)
Second round qualifying v Stalybridge Celtic 1978–79 (lost 4–1)
Second round qualifying v Southport, 1983–84 (lost 1–0)

FA Amateur Cup:
Quarter-final v Enfield 1969–70 (lost 2–0)

FA Trophy
Second round qualifying v Leeds & Carnegie College 1974–75 (lost 2–1)

FA Vase
Third round v Harborough Town 2021–22 (lost 7–1), 2025–26 (ongoing)

LWC Drinks Cup (Inter league cup)

Winners 2017-18 v Cammel Laird (won 2–1)
