= Manchester Football League =

Association football league in England

- Founded: 1893
- Country: England
- Divisions: Premier Division; Division One; Division Two; Division Three (for reserve teams); Division Four (for reserve teams); Division Five (Development Division for U23 teams)
- Number of clubs: 81 (for the purposes of the league system)
- Level on pyramid: Level 11 (Premier Division)
- Feeder to: North West Counties League
- Promotion to: North West Counties League; First Division
- Domestic cup(s): Gilgryst Cup; Murray Trophy; Open Trophy; Manchester League Cup
- Current champions: Dukinfield Town (Premier Division); North Walkden (Division One); Heywood St James (Division Two) (2025–26)
- Website: Official website

The Manchester Football League is a football league in England, affiliated with Manchester FA, covering a 30-mile radius from Manchester Town Hall. It was formed in 1893, although play ceased between 1912 and 1920. Currently it consists of five divisions, with the Premier division being at level 11 of the English football league system.

== Structure ==
The League consists of six divisions, from Premier Division to Division five. The Premier Division, Division One and Division Two can incorporate both first teams, and reserve teams of clubs who are playing at a higher level, while Divisions Three and Four and Five usually consist entirely of reserve or lower teams.

However, for the 2018–19 season only, the constitution was amended to allow a small number of reserve teams into the bottom division of the first teams (Division Two) to even up the numbers. This was put in place in the hope of keeping all teams playing regularly as opposed to the old structure which meant teams could go without a fixture for a few weeks at a time.

For the 2023–24 season Division 5 will become a new Development Division for U23's teams.

The Premier Division had a promotion and relegation arrangement with the North West Counties Football League (NWCFL), placing it at level 11 of the English football league system. However, the NWCFL's ground requirements are considerably higher than those of the Manchester League, so meeting them usually requires expensive improvements, and consequently few teams take up the opportunity of promotion. Ashton Athletic took the step up in 2006, despite only finishing 4th in Division One. Teams such as Salford City, Maine Road and Northern Nomads have all played in the league at some point. The latest teams to make the step up were Prestwich Heys, Avro and most recently Stockport Georgians.

Teams from the Premier Division are relegated to Division One, making Division One the twelfth level of the English league system. However, first teams from Division One could be relegated to Division Two after the realignment of the league structure at the start of the 2017–18 season.

Following the introduction of the Coronavirus pandemic (COVID-19) national lockdown restrictions in March 2020, the 2019/20 season was unable to be completed and was therefore declared null and void. The following season suffered the same outcome with only around a third of fixtures being completed.

== Current member clubs (2026-27) ==
=== Premier Division ===
- Atherton Town
- De La Salle
- Dukinfield Town
- Elton Vale
- Hindsford
- Manchester Corinthians
- Moorside Rangers
- North Walkden
- Old Altrinchamians
- Pennington
- Rochdale Sacred Heart
- Royton Town
- Stockport Georgians Reserves
- Tottington United
- University of Manchester
- Walshaw Sports Club

=== Division One ===
- Altrincham Hale
- Avro Reserves
- Baguley Athletic
- Bolton County
- Bolton Lads and Girls Club
- Bolton United
- Chadderton Reserves
- East Manchester
- Eccles United
- Heywood St James
- Horwich RMI
- Macclesfield Shadow Youth
- Moston Brook
- Salford Victoria
- Springhead
- Tintwistle Athletic

=== Division Two ===
- Abbey Hey Reserves
- AFC Monton
- Astley and Tyldesley
- Bacup Borough Shadow
- Chapel Town
- Glossop North End Community
- Hollinwood
- Little Lever Sports Club
- Radcliffe Town
- Ramsbottom United Reserves
- Stalybridge Celtic Reserves
- Uppermill Reserves
- Wilmslow Albion

== Recent champions of Premier Division, Division One & Division Two ==
Season	Premier Division	Division One	Division Two
1982–83	Maine Road	Mount Pleasant	
1983–84	Maine Road	Shell (Carington)	
1984–85	Maine Road	Coldhurst United	
1985–86	Maine Road	Adswood Amateurs	
1986–87	Adswood Amateurs	Castleton Gabriels	
1987–88	Stockport Georgians	Prestwich Heys	
1988–89	Abbey Hey	Avro	
1989–90	Wythenshawe Amateurs	Greater Manchester Police	
1990–91	Abbey Hey	Ramsbottom United	
1991–92	East Manchester	Woodley Sports	
1992–93	Wythenshawe Amateurs	Atherton Town	
1993–94	Abbey Hey	Winton United	
1994–95	Abbey Hey	Highfield United	
1995–96	Little Hulton United	Stand Athletic	
1996–97	Highfield United	Prestwich Heys	
1997–98	Springhead	Urmston	
1998–99	Stand Athletic	Willows	
1999–00	Stand Athletic	Sacred Heart	
2000–01	Stand Athletic	Leigh Athletic	
2001–02	Stockport Georgians	Royton Town	
2002–03	Wythenshawe Amateurs	Breightmet United	
2003–04	Royton Town	Avro	
2004–05	Prestwich Heys	AFC Blackley	
2005–06	Prestwich Heys	Whitworth Valley	
2006–07	Prestwich Heys	Walshaw Sports	
2007–08	Wigan Robin Park	Chapel Town	
2008–09	Gregorians	Springhead	
2009–10	Avro	Bury Amateurs	
2010–11	Manchester Gregorians	Avro	
2011–12	Hindsford	Wythenshawe Town	
2012–13	Hindsford	Rochdale Sacred Heart	
2013–14	Hindsford	Chapel Town	
2014–15	Stockport Georgians	Old Altrinchamians	
2015–16	Prestwich Heys	East Manchester	
2016–17	Rochdale Sacred Heart	Prestwich Heys Reserves	
2017–18	Avro	Chadderton Reserves	Altrincham Hale
2018-19	Hindsford	Heywood St James	Middleton Colts
2019-20	Null & Void	Null & Void	Null & Void
2020-21	Null & Void	Null & Void	Null & Void
2021-22	Hindsford	Moorside Rangers	Bolton United
2022–23	Rochdale Sacred Heart	Govan & University of Manchester	Chadderton Cott
2023–24	Uppermill	Stockport Georgians Reserves	Manchester Corinthians
2024–25	Rochdale Sacred Heart	Manchester Corinthians	North Walkden
2025–26	Dukinfield Town	North Walkden	Heywood St James
