= Stalybridge Celtic F.C. =

English football club in Greater Manchester

Stalybridge Celtic
- Full name: Stalybridge Celtic Football Club
- Nickname: Celts
- Founded: 1909; 117 years ago (possibly 1905)
- Ground: Bower Fold, Stalybridge
- Capacity: 6,500 (1,300 seated)
- Chairman: Nigel Jones
- Manager: Dave Jones
- League: Northern Premier League Division One West
- 2025–26: Northern Premier League Division One West, 3rd of 22
Home colours	Away colours

Stalybridge Celtic Football Club is an English football club based in Stalybridge, Greater Manchester. They are currently members of the Northern Premier League Division One West and play at Bower Fold. The team traditionally plays in a blue and white strip.

In 1921, Stalybridge Celtic became a founder member of the Football League's Third Division North. After only two seasons in the new league, they became the first club to leave the new division.

== History ==
The club's formation is usually given as 1909. However, it may have been as early as 1905 when an amateur club with the same name was formed. There were players called Storrs and Manwood who played in the 1906 and 1909 teams, and a player called Rhodes who played in the amateurs' first game; a Herbert Rhodes was a significant benefactor of the 'later' Celtic.

The club played for two seasons in the Lancashire and Cheshire Amateur League, before turning professional and joining the Lancashire Combination in 1911–12, winning the title in its first season, but withdrawing from the competition to play in the Central League - the following season a Celtic reserve XI replaced Tyldesley Albion in the Combination after the latter had played one match in the season. Celtic finished in fourth place in the Central League in 1912–13, and was runner-up in 1913–14. In an attempt to progress the club joined the Southern League. The club rejoined the Central League for the 1919–20 season and in 1921 became one of the founder members of the Football League's Third Division North. However the club resigned after two seasons, as it was felt that it could not attract enough support to justify a League side – in spite of the fact that average attendance of 5,480 in 1922 was almost 2,000 more than neighbouring Rochdale, who played in the same Division. The full Celtic story in the League is detailed in Manchester A Football History where Celtic are given the same level of analysis and research as the Manchester region's other sides.

They joined the Cheshire County League remaining members for 60 years and winning the title only once in 1980. With the league's merger with the Lancashire Combination in 1982, they became founder members of the North West Counties League, winning the title in 1984 and 1987, with the latter triumph resulting in them being promoted to the Northern Premier League (NPL). In 1992 the club won the league title and was promoted to the Football Conference, playing at that level for six seasons to 1998 before being relegated to the NPL again, after finishing bottom.

In 2000–01, the club had one of the best seasons in its history, achieving a treble of the Cheshire Senior Cup, the President's Cup and the Northern Premier League Premier Division, thus being promoted back to the Football Conference (though they were relegated after only one season). When the conference added a second level for the 2004–05 season, the club became one of the founders of the new Conference North. Until the end of 2006–07 season the manager was John Reed, who had extensive experience as a manager in English non-league football, including three successful seasons as manager of Harrogate Town. On 30 May 2007 Steve Burr was appointed as a manager.

Stalybridge (in blue) play local rivals Hyde in 2012

The 2007–08 season was one of the best in recent times; after finishing 18th the previous year, a third-place finish in the league meant a promotion opportunity to the Conference National was presented via the play-offs. After reaching the final, Stalybridge were denied after a 1–0 defeat to Barrow.

The club continued in the Conference North for the three seasons; placing 6th in the 2008–09 season in which manager Steve Burr left for Kidderminster, 10th in the 2009–10 season and 10th again in the 2010–11 season.

In the 2011–12 season, they were a huge contender for a promotion place as late as February before a poor set of results saw their hopes slip away towards the end of the season, finishing sixth, just below the last playoff place.

In the 2012–13 season, after languishing near the relegation zone for most of the year, they finished 11th following a 9-game unbeaten run. Stalybridge also reached the final of the Cheshire Senior Cup, losing 2–1 to Chester F.C.

The 2013–14 season wasn't a good one either, as Stalybridge finished 19th, narrowly avoiding relegation by 2 points. Jim Harvey was sacked in October 2013, being replaced by former player Keith Briggs. They secured Conference North football for another season with a 1–1 draw against Bradford Park Avenue in the penultimate game of the season.

The 2014–15 season was arguably the worst for a long time. Stalybridge struggled to keep their heads above water, which led to the resignation of Keith Briggs in March 2015. He was replaced by 3-time Conference North winning manager, Liam Watson. This brought a turn around in results, with Watson only losing 1 of his 7 games in charge, winning 4. Survival came down to the final game against Gainsborough, with Stalybridge needing to better Colwyn Bay's and Brackley's results. A pulsating match finished 4–4, and they survived on goal difference. The club were relegated from the NPL Premier Division in the 2022–23 season.

== Stadium ==
There has been a ground at Bower Fold since 1906. The current main stand was built in 1996, with the covered stand at the Town End (Joe Jackson Stand) dating from 1994. The main stand, replaced a wooden one dating from 1909, which held 500 fans, before being converted to tip-up seating with a reduced capacity of around 400 persons. The Lord Pendry Stand opened in 2004, replacing a covered terrace dating from the 1950s. The Mottram End cover stems from construction starting in the 1970s and finishing in the mid '80s. The main stand, holding about 700 people, is all seated. Its opposite stand, the Lord Pendry stand has 652 seats.

It is possible for the ground to be segregated with self-contained areas which include separate turnstiles, refreshment facilities and toilets (though this is rarely necessary). The away fans' area in this case is uncovered. The next area (clockwise from the away fans' area) around the ground is the Lockwood and Greenwood stand which is a covered standing area. This area is popular with home fans when Stalybridge are kicking towards this goal. Next is an uncovered standing area, followed by the Lord Tom Pendry Stand (a seated area) with a capacity of approximately three hundred. Next is a small uncovered area followed by the covered Joe Jackson stand. The club shop and bar are behind this stand. Away fans are allowed to use the bar and there is no admission charge. Next are the main turnstiles, refreshment facilities and disabled spectators' area.

The ground's capacity of 6,500 has not been reached recently. The attendance was nearly 4,000 when Chester visited for an FA Cup 1st round match in 1999.

== Current squad ==
As of 2 October 2026

Note: Flags indicate national team as defined under FIFA eligibility rules; some limited exceptions apply. Players may hold more than one non-FIFA nationality.

No.	Pos.	Nation	Player
—	GK	ENG	Conor Harte
—	GK	ENG	Charlie Monks
—	DF	ENG	Kyle Brownhill
—	DF	ENG	Jack Byrne
—	DF	ENG	Aaron Chalmers
—	DF	ENG	Josh Granite
—	DF	ENG	Jack Kenny (on loan from Chester)
—	DF	ENG	Mike Koral
—	DF	ZIM	Fortune Maphosa
—	DF	ENG	Jack Tinning

No.	Pos.	Nation	Player
—	MF	ENG	Rohan Butler
—	MF	ENG	Charlie Doyle
—	MF	ENG	Cameron Fogerty
—	MF	ENG	Ellis Horan
—	MF	ENG	Jack Irlam
—	MF	UGA	Obua Mugalula
—	MF	ENG	Andy Scarisbrick
—	MF	ENG	Liam Tongue
—	FW	ENG	Ruben Jerome
—	FW	ENG	Lewis Rawsthorn

=== Backroom staff ===
Position	Name
Manager	(England) David Jones
Assistant Manager	(England) Steve Atkinson
First Team Coach	(England) Luke Gibson
Player/Coach	
Goalkeeping Coach	(England) Phil Jackson
Sports Therapist	(England) David Pover
Student Sports Rehabilitator	(England) Ethan Cust

== Records ==
- Best FA Cup performance: Second round, 1935–36, 1993–94, 1999–00
- Best FA Trophy performance: Quarter-finals, 2001–02

== Honours ==
- Challenge shield – 1955, 1978
- Cheshire county league – 1980
- Cheshire county league cup – 1922
- Cheshire Senior Cup – 1953, 2001
- Edward case cup – 1978
- Intermediate cup – 1958, 1969
- Lancashire & Cheshire League Division 1 - 1910–11
- Lancashire Combination Division Two – 1912
- Lancashire floodlit cup – 1989
- Manchester Senior Cup – 1923
- North West Counties League – 1984, 1987
- North west counties super cup – 1984
- Northern Premier League – 1991–92, 2000–01
- Northern Premier League Challenge Cup – 1999
- Northern Premier League President's Cup – 2001, 2003
- Peter Swales Shield – 1992

== See also ==
- Ray Stanley Memorial Trophy
