= 2018–19 North West Counties Football League =

The 2018–19 North West Counties Football League season (known as the Hallmark Security League for sponsorship reasons) was the 37th in the history of the North West Counties Football League, a football competition in England.

The league comprised three divisions, the Premier Division (at level 9 of the English football league system, Step 5 National League System) and for the first occasion, rather than a single First Division, there were two regional divisions at level 10 or Step 6: the First Division North and First Division South. At the end of the season, three clubs in total were promoted from the North and South first divisions, the champions of each plus the runner-up from either with the highest points per game ratio. The champions of each of the two First Division leagues competed in a single match for the First Division Champions Cup. Additionally this season there were two cup competitions: the League Challenge Cup (known as the Macron Challenge Cup for sponsorship reasons), a knockout competition open to all the league's clubs; and the First Division Trophy, a knockout trophy competition for First Division clubs only.

== Premier Division ==
North West Counties Football League Premier Division
- Season: 2018–19
- Teams: 20
- Champions: City of Liverpool
- Promoted: City of Liverpool
- Relegated: Abbey Hey; West Didsbury & Chorlton
- Matches: 380
- Goals: 1,328 (3.49 per match)
- Average attendance: 172

At the end of the previous season 6 clubs had left the division:

- AFC Darwen, relegated to First Division North
- AFC Liverpool, relegated to First Division North
- Barnton, relegated to First Division South
- Maine Road, relegated to First Division South
- Runcorn Linnets, promoted to Northern Premier League Division One West
- Widnes, promoted to Northern Premier League Division One West

The 2018–19 Premier Division club allocations from the FA Leagues Committee (subject to appeal) were announced on 25 May 2018 and the league constitution was ratified at the league's AGM on 16 June 2018. The division comprised 20 clubs, 17 remaining from the previous season plus 3 additions (all promoted from the First Division:

- Litherland REMYCA, promoted as runners-up
- Silsden, promoted as champions
- Whitchurch Alport, promoted as promotion play-off winners

At the end of the season the champions City of Liverpool were promoted to Northern Premier League Division One North West. Three other clubs left the division: Silsden were transferred laterally to the Northern Counties East League Premier Division; and both Abbey Hey and West Didsbury & Chorlton were relegated to the First Division South.

=== Table ===
Pos	Team	Pld	W	D	L	GF	GA	GD	Pts	Season End Notes
1	City of Liverpool (C, P)	38	29	4	5	89	37	+52	91	Promoted to Northern Premier; League Division One North West
2	Bootle	38	28	5	5	98	36	+62	89	
3	Congleton Town	38	25	3	10	86	37	+49	78	
4	Northwich Victoria	38	20	7	11	85	49	+36	67	
5	Ashton Athletic	38	19	4	15	69	49	+20	61	
6	Charnock Richard	38	19	4	15	80	68	+12	61	
7	Runcorn Town	38	19	3	16	68	65	+3	60	
8	Squires Gate	38	17	7	14	79	62	+17	57 (Note: Squires Gate had one point deducted for contravening league rules)	
9	Silsden	38	17	6	15	59	65	−6	57	Transferred to Northern Counties; East League Premier Division
10	1874 Northwich	38	15	11	12	63	55	+8	56	
11	Barnoldswick Town	38	17	5	16	72	75	−3	56	
12	Burscough	38	14	9	15	74	66	+8	51	
13	Irlam	38	13	10	15	57	62	−5	49	
14	Whitchurch Alport	38	12	7	19	54	59	−5	43	
15	Litherland REMYCA	38	11	7	20	51	78	−27	39 (Note: Litherland REMYCA had one point deducted for contravening league rules)	
16	Winsford United	38	10	8	20	55	86	−31	38	
17	Hanley Town	38	11	5	22	53	85	−32	38	
18	Padiham	38	10	7	21	55	85	−30	37	
19	West Didsbury & Chorlton (R)	38	10	4	24	55	89	−34	34	Relegated to First Division South
20	Abbey Hey (R)	38	5	2	31	26	120	−94	17	Relegated to First Division South

Source: "Final Tables, Season 2018/19". nwcfl.com., "North West Counties League - North West Counties League Premier Division: 2018 – 19: League Table". nonleaguematters.co.uk.
Rules for classification: 1) Points; 2) Goal difference; 3) Number of goals scored; 4) Number of matches won; 5) Head-to-head results
(C) Champions; (P) Promoted; (R) Relegated

=== Results ===
Home \ Away	18N	ABH	ASH	BWT	BTL	BUR	CHR	COL	CON	HAN	IRL	LIT	NWV	PAD	RNT	SIL	SQG	WDC	WHI	WIN
1874 Northwich		1–1	0–3	2–0	2–1	4–2	1–1	3–6	3–2	2–1	2–4	1–0	1–1	1–3	3–0	5–0	1–1	5–1	1–0	1–1
Abbey Hey	0–3		0–6	1–7	2–3	0–3	0–1	0–1	0–3	0–4	2–1	1–6	0–1	2–1	0–2	1–2	1–5	0–6	0–6	2–2
Ashton Athletic	2–2	3–0		0–3	2–0	1–2	0–1	0–4	0–3	1–0	3–2	3–0	2–0	8–0	3–0	1–0	0–1	5–0	2–1	4–1
Barnoldswick T	3–2	6–0	2–1		0–1	2–0	0–5	2–3	1–6	1–4	2–2	4–1	3–4	1–3	5–1	0–2	2–1	2–1	1–3	4–1
Bootle	2–0	5–1	4–2	4–0		0–3	3–1	1–0	2–1	3–0	0–0	4–0	1–1	4–0	4–2	2–0	3–5	3–0	5–2	2–1
Burscough	1–1	5–0	2–4	5–0	0–3		1–1	0–1	0–1	1–2	1–2	1–1	5–3	3–3	4–0	3–2	1–1	3–0	2–3	4–0
Charnock Richard	0–2	2–1	2–1	2–0	0–5	4–1		0–3	2–1	4–1	1–3	4–0	1–2	3–5	1–4	0–2	5–2	1–0	2–1	6–2
City of Liverpool	1–1	3–0	2–1	2–0	0–2	3–0	5–3		2–1	3–2	2–2	4–0	2–1	3–0	4–0	1–2	3–2	4–0	1–0	5–2
Congleton Town	0–1	3–1	3–0	0–0	3–0	0–0	3–3	3–0		3–1	1–0	1–0	2–1	3–0 (Note: Congleton Town v Padiham: Score of 3–0 from the match abandoned at 65 minutes allowed to stand as the result)	1–2	5–0	1–3	4–1	1–3	3–0
Hanley Town	2–2	2–0	1–2	0–3	0–3	1–2	1–5	2–4	0–4		4–2	1–3	0–3	0–1	3–2	1–0	2–1	1–1	1–6	2–0
Irlam	1–0	1–2	0–0	2–3	0–2	2–2	2–4	0–2	1–0	1–2		2–2	0–4	1–0	0–1	3–3	0–2	2–3	1–0	3–1
Litherland R	2–1	3–1	2–0	3–3	1–1	2–0	3–2	1–2	0–3	1–3	5–1		0–5	2–2	2–1	0–2	1–2	0–4	1–3	1–1
Northwich Vic.	3–2	3–1	0–0	0–1	2–3	2–2	2–0	1–2	1–3	3–1	0–1	2–1		2–2	5–1	2–0	2–1	6–0	2–0	4–1
Padiham	1–2	4–0	0–2	1–2	1–6	2–3	1–2	0–1	1–3	4–1	0–0	4–0	0–4		2–5	1–4	2–2	1–0	3–2	3–2
Runcorn Town	2–1	5–1	1–0	2–2	0–2	2–3	4–0	2–1	3–1	2–0	1–1	1–0	1–1	3–2		0–2	2–3	5–0	2–1	3–0
Silsden	0–0	0–1	2–0	0–1	0–7	3–2	1–1	1–1	4–1	2–1	2–5	0–2	2–2	2–0	0–3		1–1	3–0	1–2	4–2
Squires Gate	3–0	4–1	6–2	5–2	0–1	6–1	0–3	0–3	0–1	1–1	2–5	3–0	0–3	1–0	2–0	3–4		0–1	4–0	0–2
W Didsbury & Ch.	1–2	4–2	1–2	2–3	2–2	1–4	1–2	1–3	0–5	4–0	0–1	2–2	3–5	1–1	3–1	2–1	1–2		3–1	1–2
Whitchurch Alport	1–1	0–1	1–1	2–0	1–3	1–0	3–2	1–1	2–3	2–2	1–1	1–2	1–0	0–0	1–0	1–2	1–1	0–2		0–3
Winsford United	2–1	3–0	0–2	1–1	1–1	2–2	0–4	0–1	0–3	3–3	0–2	2–1	3–2	4–1	1–2	2–3	3–3	3–2	1–0	

Source: "Premier Division Results 2018/19". nwcfl.com.
Legend: Blue = home team win; Yellow = draw; Red = away team win.

=== Stadia and locations ===
Locations of the 2018–19 North West Counties Football League Premier Division teams

Team	Stadium
1874 Northwich	Barton Stadium (groundshare with Winsford United)
Abbey Hey	The Abbey Stadium, Gorton
Ashton Athletic	Brockstedes Park
Barnoldswick Town	Greenberfield Lane
Bootle	New Bucks Park
Burscough	Victoria Park
Charnock Richard	Mossie Park
City of Liverpool	New Bucks Park (groundshare with Bootle)
Congleton Town	Ivy Gardens
Hanley Town	Abbey Lane
Irlam	Silver Street
Litherland REMYCA	Litherland Sports Park
Northwich Victoria	Wincham Park (groundshare with Witton Albion)
Padiham	Arbories Memorial Sports Ground
Runcorn Town	Pavilions Sports Complex
Silsden	Keighley Road Stadium
Squires Gate	School Road
West Didsbury & Chorlton	Brookburn Road, Chorlton
Whitchurch Alport	Yockings Park
Winsford United	Barton Stadium

== First Division ==
At the end of the previous season 3 clubs left the division, all promoted to the Premier Division:

- Silsden, promoted as champions
- Litherland REMYCA, promoted as runners-up
- Whitchurch Alport, promoted as promotion play-off winners

Prior to the 2018–19 season the remaining 19 clubs were split into the two newly formed regional divisions – the First Division North and the First Division South.

== First Division North ==
North West Counties Football League First Division North
- Season: 2018–19
- Teams: 20
- Champions: Longridge Town
- Promoted: Avro; Longridge Town
- Matches: 380
- Goals: 1,617 (4.26 per match)
- Average attendance: 88

The club allocations to the newly formed 2018–19 First Division North from the FA Leagues Committee (subject to appeal) were announced on 25 May 2018 and its constitution ratified at the league's AGM on 16 June 2018. The division comprised 20 clubs:

- Two clubs relegated from the Premier Division
  - AFC Darwen
  - AFC Liverpool
- Ten clubs allocated from the First Division
  - AFC Blackpool
  - Atherton Laburnum Rovers
  - Bacup Borough
  - Carlisle City
  - Chadderton
  - Daisy Hill
  - Holker Old Boys
  - Nelson
  - Prestwich Heys
  - St Helens Town
- Eight clubs promoted from National League System Step 7 divisions allocated to the division by the FA Leagues Committee:
  - Ashton Town, from the Cheshire League – returning to the league following a one season absence
  - Avro, from the Manchester League
  - Cleator Moor Celtic, from the Wearside League
  - Garstang, from the West Lancashire League
  - Longridge Town, from the West Lancashire League
  - Lower Breck, from the Liverpool County Premier League
  - Shelley, from the West Yorkshire League
  - Steeton, from the West Riding County Amateur League

At the end of the season, three clubs left the division: the champions Longridge Town and runners-up Avro (who had both joined the league from Step 7 this season) were promoted to the Premier Division; and Carlisle City were transferred laterally to the Northern League Division Two

Over the season a new league record for the highest average goals scored per match of 4.26 was established (exceeding the 4.02 former record from the 1994–95 season); and Longridge Town with 144 goals from 38 matches exceeded the previous highest goals scored in a season by a single club at First Division (formerly Division Two) level (previously the highest was 142 from 36 matches by Cammell Laird in the 2004–05 season).

=== League table ===
Pos	Team	Pld	W	D	L	GF	GA	GD	Pts	Season End Notes
1	Longridge Town (C, P)	38	28	6	4	144	52	+92	90	Promoted to Premier Division
2	Avro (P)	38	28	4	6	118	44	+74	88	Promoted to Premier Division
3	AFC Liverpool	38	25	4	9	97	67	+30	79	
4	Lower Breck	38	24	5	9	130	57	+73	77	
5	Prestwich Heys	38	22	3	13	82	52	+30	69	
6	Carlisle City	38	21	4	13	82	76	+6	67	Transferred to Northern; League Division Two
7	Garstang	38	18	6	14	87	68	+19	60	
8	Bacup Borough	38	18	6	14	84	71	+13	59 (Note: Bacup Borough had one point deducted for contravening league rules)	
9	Ashton Town	38	16	7	15	82	88	−6	55	
10	AFC Darwen	38	16	6	16	76	86	−10	54	
11	Cleator Moor Celtic	38	15	6	17	78	87	−9	51	
12	Shelley	38	13	9	16	59	76	−17	48	
13	AFC Blackpool	38	13	8	17	57	79	−22	47	
14	Nelson	38	12	9	17	60	66	−6	45	
15	Steeton	38	11	11	16	80	93	−13	44	
16	Chadderton	38	11	7	20	77	82	−5	40	
17	St Helens Town	38	9	7	22	82	100	−18	34	
18	Holker Old Boys	38	9	4	25	54	113	−59	31	
19	Daisy Hill	38	6	7	25	58	124	−66	25	Reprieved from relegation
20	Atherton Laburnum Rovers	38	3	5	30	30	136	−106	13 (Note: Atherton Laburnum Rovers had one point deducted for contravening league rules)	Reprieved from relegation

Source: "Final Tables, Season 2018/19". nwcfl.com., "North West Counties League - North West Counties League Division One North: 2018 – 19: League Table". nonleaguematters.co.uk.
Rules for classification: 1) Points; 2) Goal difference; 3) Number of goals scored; 4) Number of matches won; 5) Head-to-head results
(C) Champions; (P) Promoted

=== Results ===
Home \ Away	ABL	ADR	ALV	ASH	ALR	AVR	BAC	CAR	CHA	CLE	DSH	GAR	HOL	LON	LOW	NEL	PRE	SHE	STH	STE
AFC Blackpool		3–1	0–2	4–0	1–0	0–4	2–3	3–0	0–0	0–0	2–2	3–1	2–2	1–1	2–8	2–1	1–0	1–2	1–0	1–1
AFC Darwen	2–3		0–1	1–1	1–0	1–4	2–1	2–2	5–1	3–0	1–3	2–1	2–1	2–6	3–2	2–1	2–3	2–0	7–1	2–4
AFC Liverpool	3–1	3–2		1–3	7–0	1–0	3–2	6–2	3–5	0–5	5–1	4–3	1–2	1–1	3–2	1–0	2–0	3–1	2–1	3–3
Ashton Town	3–2	3–4	3–4		1–1	1–5	6–2	0–3	3–2	1–1 (Note: Ashton Town v Cleator Moor Celtic: score at 1–1 of abandoned match allowed to stand as the result)	4–1	2–1	2–1	0–4	1–0	0–2	0–2	1–2	2–4	5–2
Atherton Lab R	3–2	4–4	1–3	0–6		0–2	0–5	0–3	2–2	0–3	1–4	0–5	0–1	0–6	1–7	1–1	1–2	0–2	0–3	0–3
Avro	3–3	5–1	2–0	5–0	7–0		3–3	7–1	1–0	5–0	5–0	4–2	6–0	3–2	1–4	1–1	3–2	2–1	3–1	0–1
Bacup Boro'	4–3	3–2	0–2	3–2	4–0	0–3		3–2	1–2	4–2	4–2	3–1	3–1	0–3	0–0	2–2	0–2	1–1	2–2	5–1
Carlisle City	1–2	1–3	4–0	5–4	3–0	4–2	2–1		1–0	3–0	6–3	1–3	2–1	0–2	0–3	2–2	2–1	4–0	5–4	4–3
Chadderton	3–0	4–0	1–2	2–3	6–2	1–1	3–3	1–2		6–1	1–1	4–2	5–0	1–2	1–7	0–1	1–2	3–4	3–2	1–0
Cleator Moor C	4–1	7–1	0–4	1–1	2–0	1–2	1–2	2–0	4–1		5–0	0–3	1–0	3–6	1–4	5–1	0–3	4–4	2–1	5–4
Daisy Hill	0–1	2–3	0–6	1–4	2–2	1–4	1–2	1–2	3–2	3–1		2–0	0–3	3–3	4–1	1–4	3–3	1–2	0–5	2–2
Garstang	0–1	2–0	3–0	2–2	2–4	2–1	1–0	1–3	5–4	3–3	2–0		2–2	1–1	2–2	2–0	2–0	8–2	1–0	4–2
Holker OB	5–0	0–3	3–3	0–2	5–0	0–3	2–1	3–5	3–0	0–4	3–3	0–4		2–11	6–2	0–4	0–4	0–2	2–1	1–2
Longridge T	1–1	1–2	5–3	7–2	8–1	3–0	5–0	7–0	3–1	4–0	8–1	0–3	4–1		4–1	3–2	5–1	4–2	5–1	5–2
Lower Breck	3–1	5–0	4–2	6–1	8–2	2–3	3–1	2–2	4–2	8–1	2–1	5–1	7–1	3–0		1–0	3–0	6–0	1–2	5–1
Nelson	1–4	1–1	0–2	1–4	1–0	0–3	0–4	0–1	2–2	4–2	8–1	2–1	2–1	1–3	1–2		1–5	0–2	4–0	1–1
Prestwich Heys	8–1	1–0	1–2	2–4	6–0	2–6	1–0	1–0	1–0	2–0	3–1	4–1	6–0	1–2	2–1	1–1		0–2	2–2	3–1
Shelley	3–0	1–3	1–3	0–0	0–1	1–3	1–4	0–1	0–0	2–2	4–1	2–4	3–1	1–2	0–0	1–4	1–0		3–1	1–1
St Helens T	3–2	2–2	3–3	1–2	3–0	0–2	2–6	0–2	2–4	1–3	4–2	1–3	9–0	4–4	3–5	2–2	1–2	2–2		4–0
Steeton	1–0	2–2	2–3	3–3	5–3	2–4	0–2	2–2	4–2	0–2	6–1	2–2	2–1	1–3	1–1	0–1	0–3	3–3	4–3	

Source: "First Division North Results 2018/19". nwcfl.com.
Legend: Blue = home team win; Yellow = draw; Red = away team win.

=== Stadia and locations ===
Locations of the 2018–19 North West Counties Football League First Division North teams

Team	Stadium
AFC Blackpool	The Mechanics
AFC Darwen	The Anchor Ground
AFC Liverpool	Rossett Park, Crosby (groundshare with Marine)
Ashton Town	Edge Green Street
Atherton Laburnum Rovers	Crilly Park
Avro	Whitebank Stadium, Oldham
Bacup Borough	West View
Carlisle City	Gillford Park Stadium
Chadderton	MCA Stadium
Cleator Moor Celtic	McGrath Park
Daisy Hill	New Sirs, Westhoughton
Garstang	The Riverside
Holker Old Boys	Rakesmoor Lane, Barrow-in-Furness
Longridge Town	Mike Riding Ground
Lower Breck	Anfield Sports and Community Centre
Nelson	Victoria Park
Prestwich Heys	Adie Moran Park
Shelley	Storthes Hall Park
St Helens Town	Ruskin Drive Sportsground
Steeton	Cougar Park

== First Division South ==
North West Counties Football League First Division South
- Season: 2018–19
- Teams: 20
- Champions: Rylands
- Promoted: Rylands
- Relegated: Stone Dominoes
- Matches: 380
- Goals: 1,444 (3.8 per match)
- Average attendance: 79

The club allocations to the newly formed 2018–19 First Division South from the FA Leagues Committee (subject to appeal) were announced on 25 May 2018 and its constitution ratified at the league's AGM on 16 June 2018. The division comprised 20 clubs:

- Two clubs relegated from the Premier Division:
  - Barnton
  - Maine Road
- Nine clubs allocated from the First Division:
  - Abbey Hulton United
  - Alsager Town
  - Cammell Laird 1907
  - Cheadle Town
  - Eccleshall
  - FC Oswestry Town
  - New Mills
  - Sandbach United
  - Stockport Town
- Seven clubs promoted from National League System Step 7 divisions, allocated to the division by the FA Leagues Committee:
  - Cheadle Heath Nomads, from the Cheshire League
  - Rylands, from the Cheshire League
  - St Martins, from the West Midlands (Regional) League
  - Stone Dominoes, from the Staffordshire County Senior League – returning to the league after resigning from the Premier Division at the end of the 2012–13 season in which they had conceded a league record 166 goals with a record negative goal difference of −135 over the season.
  - Vauxhall Motors, from the West Cheshire League – returning to the league from which they had been promoted after the 1999–2000 season and following subsequent promotions had progressed to the Conference North from which they had resigned and returned to the West Cheshire League
  - Wythenshawe Amateurs, from the Manchester League
  - Wythenshawe Town, from the Cheshire League
- Two clubs allocated to the division by the FA Leagues Committee moved laterally from the West Midlands (Regional) League:
  - Ellesmere Rangers
  - Stone Old Alleynians

At the end of the season two clubs, who had both been promoted to the division this season, left from opposite ends of the league table: champions Rylands were promoted to the Premier Division and Stone Dominoes were relegated back to the Staffordshire County Senior League.

=== League table ===
Pos	Team	Pld	W	D	L	GF	GA	GD	Pts	Season End Notes
1	Rylands (C, P)	38	28	4	6	111	27	+84	85 (Note: Rylands had three points deducted for fielding an ineligible player)	Promoted to Premier Division
2	Vauxhall Motors	38	23	9	6	86	46	+40	78	
3	Stone Old Alleynians	38	21	9	8	92	56	+36	72	
4	Wythenshawe Amateurs	38	21	8	9	92	53	+39	71	
5	Wythenshawe Town (Note: Abbey Hulton United v Wythenshawe Town (27 April 2019): match cancelled due to "legal entity issues", Abbey Hulton United awarded a win and three points)	38	21	5	12	92	58	+34	68	
6	FC Oswestry Town	38	20	8	10	76	52	+24	68	
7	Sandbach United	38	19	10	9	88	54	+34	67	
8	Abbey Hulton United	38	20	4	14	71	65	+6	64	
9	Cheadle Heath Nomads	38	19	5	14	77	66	+11	62	
10	Stockport Town	38	16	5	17	76	62	+14	53	
11	St Martins	38	15	7	16	71	68	+3	52	
12	Barnton	38	15	5	18	71	72	−1	50	
13	Eccleshall	38	14	4	20	65	91	−26	46	
14	Maine Road	38	14	0	24	71	98	−27	42	
15	Cammell Laird 1907	38	10	11	17	55	73	−18	41	
16	Cheadle Town	38	11	10	17	61	67	−6	40 (Note: Cheadle Town had three points deducted for contravening league rules)	
17	Alsager Town	38	11	7	20	47	80	−33	40	
18	New Mills	38	10	5	23	74	113	−39	35	
19	Ellesmere Rangers	38	6	7	25	43	97	−54	25	Reprieved from relegation
20	Stone Dominoes (R)	38	4	1	33	25	146	−121	13	Relegated to Staffordshire; County Senior League

Source: "Final Tables, Season 2018/19". nwcfl.com., "North West Counties League - North West Counties League Division One South: 2018 – 19: League Table". nonleaguematters.co.uk.
Rules for classification: 1) Points; 2) Goal difference; 3) Number of goals scored; 4) Number of matches won; 5) Head-to-head results
(C) Champions; (P) Promoted; (R) Relegated

=== Results ===
Home \ Away	ABH	ALS	BNT	CAM	CHN	CHT	ECC	ELL	OSW	MNR	NWM	RYL	SAN	STM	STK	STD	SOA	VAU	WYA	WYT
Abbey Hulton U		2–1	2–1	3–1	4–0	1–1	1–0	1–0	2–1	3–5	4–1	2–0	2–2	1–2	3–1	5–0	2–1	0–1	2–2	W–x (Note: Abbey Hulton United v Wythenshawe Town (27 April 2019): match cancelled due to "legal entity issues", Abbey Hulton United awarded a win and three points)
Alsager Town	2–0		1–1	3–3	4–1	2–0	1–1	0–1	0–5	2–0	3–1	2–1	1–2	1–1	0–2	3–1	1–3	1–2	1–0	1–4
Barnton	0–3	5–1		0–1	2–0	0–4	5–1	2–0	2–5	5–0	1–0	1–3	1–1	1–0	2–1	4–2	2–4	0–2	0–3	0–3
Cammell L 1907	2–3	1–1	2–0		1–0	1–1	1–0	1–1	2–0	1–0	1–1	0–0	1–1	1–0	1–1	8–1	3–3	1–4	1–3	1–3
Cheadle Heath N	2–0	2–0	2–1	3–0		1–1	2–2	2–1	3–0	2–1	2–3	2–5	2–4	3–2	2–0	3–2	2–5	5–2	3–2	2–0
Cheadle Town	1–2	1–2	0–3	1–1	0–2		3–2	4–1	1–0	2–3	1–4	0–0	0–7	0–1	1–2	2–0	0–2	1–1	2–0	1–2
Eccleshall	2–4	3–1	5–2	0–4	1–4	0–0		2–4	2–0	4–2	3–2	0–3	1–4	3–0	4–3	0–1	1–3	2–1	1–3	3–11
Ellesmere R	1–1	2–0	0–5	1–4	1–1	0–1	0–1		2–2	1–2	2–2	1–5	2–0	0–1	1–3	1–0	1–1	1–2	0–4	2–4
FC Oswestry T	2–1	4–3	0–0	2–0	2–0	2–1	3–0	5–2		3–2	5–5	0–0	2–0	3–3	3–1	2–1	1–0	3–1	1–0	0–4
Maine Road	6–5	4–0	1–2	3–1	0–3	5–1	1–2	4–1	2–1		1–4	0–5	0–2	3–4	1–2	4–0	2–3	1–3	2–6	2–3
New Mills	2–0	2–3	2–5	5–2	2–4	1–3	1–5	3–2	1–3	1–2		1–6	1–2	2–3	1–1	4–2	3–1	1–4	3–2	0–4
Rylands	6–0	3–0	5–0	1–0	3–5	1–3	3–0	7–0	3–0	4–0	5–0		2–0	1–0	4–1	6–0	1–0	0–3	5–1	3–0
Sandbach United	1–2	0–0	3–3	6–2	3–0	2–2	4–2	3–1	1–3	5–1	2–2	1–3		5–3	1–2	3–0	0–1	1–1	2–2	2–2
St Martins	1–4	3–2	4–1	3–1	1–1	3–1	1–2	1–1	3–2	1–2	2–6	2–0	1–3		0–2	9–1	2–2	0–0	0–4	1–1
Stockport Town	2–0	2–2	1–2	0–0	2–1	3–1	5–1	4–0	3–0	3–0	4–1	0–4	1–2	1–2		1–1	8–0	1–2	2–3	3–4
Stone Dominoes	1–2	0–2	2–1	0–2	0–6	0–13	0–4	3–0	0–5	0–5	2–1	1–3	0–6	0–4	0–3		0–6	0–3	0–4	1–7
Stone Old All.	6–0	4–0	1–0	4–1	3–1	2–2	1–1	4–1	0–0	6–1	7–0	0–5	2–3	1–0	2–0	2–1		3–3	2–1	1–0
Vauxhall Motors	2–1	5–0	3–2	5–1	3–1	2–2	3–1	3–2	0–0	3–0	4–1	0–1	0–1	4–3	3–2	5–0	2–1		1–1	1–1
Wythenshawe Am	3–2	7–0	1–1	2–1	1–0	2–3	4–1	4–5	1–1	3–1	5–2	1–1	1–0	1–0	5–2	4–1	3–3	1–1		1–0
Wythenshawe T	3–1	1–0	3–2	2–0	2–2	4–0	0–2	5–1	0–5	1–2	5–2	0–3	2–3	1–4	2–1	3–1	2–2	3–1	0–1	

Source: "First Division South Results 2018/19". nwcfl.com.
Legend: Blue = home team win; Yellow = draw; Red = away team win.

=== Stadia and locations ===
Locations of the 2018–19 North West Counties Football League First Division South teams
Locations of North West Counties First Division South 2018–19 teams (Greater Manchester)

Team	Stadium
Abbey Hulton United	Birches Head Road
Alsager Town	Wood Park Stadium
Barnton	Townfield
Cammell Laird 1907	Kirklands, Birkenhead
Cheadle Heath Nomads	The Heath
Cheadle Town	Park Road Stadium
Eccleshall	Pershall Park
Ellesmere Rangers	Beech Grove
FC Oswestry Town	Park Hall Stadium
Maine Road	Brantingham Road, Chorlton
New Mills	Church Lane
Rylands	Gorsey Lane, Warrington
Sandbach United	Sandbach Community Football Centre
St Martins	The Venue, Oswestry
Stockport Town	Stockport Sports Village
Stone Dominoes	Yarnfield Lane
Stone Old Alleynians	Yarnfield Lane
Vauxhall Motors	Rivacre Park, Ellesmere Port
Wythenshawe Amateurs	Hollyhedge Park
Wythenshawe Town	Ericstan Stadium

== League Challenge Cup ==
The 2018–19 League Challenge Cup (known as the Macron Challenge Cup for sponsorship reasons) was a knockout competition open to all the league's 60 clubs. The final, played at Altrincham F.C. contested by Premier Division clubs, was won 1–0 by 1874 Northwich who defeated City of Liverpool who were thus denied a league and cup double.

=== First round ===
From the 60 clubs in the draw 28 first round ties featuring 56 clubs were drawn. Four clubs, Atherton Laburnum Rovers (FDN), Barnoldswick Town (PD), Wythenshawe Amateurs (FDS) and Wythenshawe Town (FDS) received byes to the second round.

(Appended to club names in the results listings below: '(PD)'=Premier Division club; '(FDN)'=First Division North club; '(FDS)'=First Division South club)

Home team (division)	Score	Away team (division)
Abbey Hey (PD)	3–3 (6–5 p)	Daisy Hill (FDN)
Bacup Borough (FDN)	2–3	Avro (FDN)
Barnton (FDS)	0–4	Congleton Town (PD)
Bootle (PD)	2–2 (4–2 p)	Vauxhall Motors (FDS)
Burscough (PD)	5–1	New Mills (FDS)
Chadderton (FDN)	3–4	1874 Northwich (PD)
Charnock Richard (PD)	0–0 (1–3 p)	Runcorn Town (PD)
Cheadle Heath Nomads (FDS)	3–1	Litherland REMYCA (PD)
City of Liverpool (PD)	3–1	Ashton Athletic (PD)
Cleator Moor Celtic (FDN)	5–2	Winsford United (PD)
Eccleshall (FDS)	3–2	AFC Darwen (FDN)
FC Oswestry Town (FDS)	x–W (Note: FC Oswestry Town disqualified for fielding ineligible player (match result: 2–2 (5–4 p)))	West Didsbury & Chorlton (PD)
Holker Old Boys (FDN)	0–9	Lower Breck (FDN)
Irlam (PD)	1–3	Abbey Hulton United (FDS)
Longridge Town (FDN)	1–3	Squires Gate (PD)
Maine Road (FDS)	4–0	Steeton (FDN)
Nelson (FDN)	2–1	Hanley Town (PD)
Northwich Victoria (PD)	5–1	Alsager Town (FDS)
Padiham (PD)	void (Note: Both Padiham and Shelley disqualified for fielding ineligible players (match result: 5–1))	Shelley (FDN)
Rylands (FDS)	5–1	Carlisle City (FDN)
Sandbach United (FDS)	4–1	AFC Liverpool (FDN)
Silsden (PD)	0–2	Garstang (FDN)
St Helens Town (FDN)	0–2	Cheadle Town (FDS)
St Martins (FDS)	2–4	Cammell Laird 1907 (FDS)
Stockport Town (FDS)	3–2	Ellesmere Rangers (FDS)
Stone Dominoes (FDS)	W–x (Note: Ashton Town disqualified for fielding ineligible player (match result: 2–4))	Ashton Town (FDN)
Stone Old Alleynians (FDS)	1–3	AFC Blackpool (FDN)
Whitchurch Alport (PD)	1–1 (3–5 p)	Prestwich Heys (FDN)

=== Second round ===
Home team (division)	Score	Away team (division)
1874 Northwich (PD)	5–0	AFC Blackpool (FDN)
Abbey Hey (PD)	2–0	Atherton Laburnum Rovers (FDN)
Abbey Hulton United (FDS)	bye (Note: Abbey Hulton United received a bye as both Padiham and Shelley were disqualified from the previous round)	–
Avro (FDN)	7–0	Wythenshawe Town (FDS)
Barnoldswick Town (PD)	3–0	Wythenshawe Amateurs (FDS)
Burscough (PD)	3–1	Sandbach United (FDS)
Cammell Laird 1907 (FDS)	0–0 (6–5 p)	Lower Breck (FDN)
Cheadle Town (FDS)	5–0	Bootle (PD)
City of Liverpool (PD)	1–0	Squires Gate (PD)
Eccleshall (FDS)	W–x (Note: West Didsbury & Chorlton disqualified for fielding ineligible player (match result: 1–2))	West Didsbury & Chorlton (PD)
Maine Road (FDS)	0–5	Nelson (FDN)
Northwich Victoria (PD)	3–1	Runcorn Town (PD)
Prestwich Heys (FDN)	5–0	Cleator Moor Celtic (FDN)
Rylands (FDS)	5–0	Cheadle Heath Nomads (FDS)
Stockport Town (FDS)	2–2 (3–5 p)	Garstang (FDN)
Stone Dominoes (FDS)	0–4	Congleton Town (PD)

=== Third round ===
Home team (division)	Score	Away team (division)
Abbey Hey (PD)	1–4	1874 Northwich (PD)
Abbey Hulton United (FDS)	0–1	Congleton Town (PD)
Avro (FDN)	7–2	Garstang (FDN)
Barnoldswick Town (PD)	9–4	Eccleshall (FDS)
Cammell Laird 1907 (FDS)	3–1	Rylands (FDS)
City of Liverpool (PD)	6–2	Burscough (PD)
Nelson (FDN)	2–1	Prestwich Heys (FDN)
Northwich Victoria (PD)	5–2	Cheadle Town (FDS)

=== Quarter-finals ===
Home team (division)	Score	Away team (division)
1874 Northwich (PD)	3–2	Barnoldswick Town (PD)
Avro (FDN)	3–1	Nelson (FDN)
City of Liverpool (PD)	2–1	Northwich Victoria (PD)
Congleton Town (PD)	6–0	Cammell Laird 1907 (FDS)

=== Semi-finals ===
The semi-finals were decided on aggregate score from two legs played

Tie	Home team (division)	Score	Away team (division)
1	Avro (FDN)	1–3	City of Liverpool (PD)
1	City of Liverpool (PD)	3–1	Avro (FDN)
1	City of Liverpool won 6–2 on aggregate		
2	Congleton Town (PD)	0–5	1874 Northwich (PD)
2	1874 Northwich (PD)	2–0	Congleton Town (PD)
2	1874 Northwich won 7–0 on aggregate		

=== Final ===
Team (division)	Score	Team (division)
Played 4 May 2019 at Altrincham F.C., Moss Lane stadium
1874 Northwich (PD)	1–0	City of Liverpool (PD)

source: "League Challenge Cup: 2018/19 Season". nwcfl.com.

== First Division Trophy ==
The 2018–19 First Division Trophy was a knockout competition for First Division clubs only. The final, played at Vauxhall Motors F.C., was won 4–2 by Sandbach United from the First Division South who defeated Avro from the North division.

=== First round ===
Sixteen clubs were drawn into first round matches, the remaining twenty-four received byes to the second round.

(Appended to club names in the results listings below: '(FDN)'=First Division North club; '(FDS)'=First Division South club)

Home team (division)	Score	Away team (division)
AFC Darwen (FDN)	2–4	Carlisle City (FDN)
Alsager Town (FDS)	5–3	Daisy Hill (FDN)
Atherton Laburnum Rovers (FDN)	1–6	Cheadle Town (FDS)
Holker Old Boys (FDN)	0–6	Garstang (FDN)
Nelson (FDN)	3–1	St Martins (FDS)
Sandbach United (FDS)	6–0	New Mills (FDS)
Stone Old Alleynians (FDS)	2–0	Shelley (FDN)
Wythenshawe Town (FDS)	2–3	AFC Blackpool (FDN)
The remaining 24 clubs received byes to the second round

=== Second round ===
Home team (division)	Score	Away team (division)
Abbey Hulton United (FDS)	2–3 (3–4 p)	Rylands (FDS)
AFC Blackpool (FDN)	2–1	Stockport Town (FDS)
AFC Liverpool (FDN)	3–0	Cleator Moor Celtic (FDN)
Ashton Town (FDN)	2–4	Wythenshawe Amateurs (FDS)
Avro (FDN)	7–0	Stone Dominoes (FDS)
Chadderton (FDN)	2–3	Alsager Town (FDS)
Cheadle Heath Nomads (FDS)	5–2	St Helens Town (FDN)
Eccleshall (FDS)	2–1	Nelson (FDN)
Ellesmere Rangers (FDS)	1–1 (4–2 p)	Stone Old Alleynians (FDS)
Longridge Town (FDN)	1–1 (2–4 p)	Garstang (FDN)
Lower Breck (FDN)	0–3	Carlisle City (FDN)
Maine Road (FDS)	W–x (Note: FC Oswestry Town disqualified for fielding ineligible player (match result: 2–2 (1–4 p)))	FC Oswestry Town (FDS)
Prestwich Heys (FDN)	1–6	Barnton (FDS)
Sandbach United (FDS)	5–0	Cheadle Town (FDS)
Steeton (FDN)	1–2	Bacup Borough (FDN)
Vauxhall Motors (FDS)	1–0	Cammell Laird 1907 (FDS)

=== Third round ===
Home team (division)	Score	Away team (division)
AFC Blackpool (FDN)	0–2	Ellesmere Rangers (FDS)
Alsager Town (FDS)	0–2	Sandbach United (FDS)
Bacup Borough (FDN)	2–2 (4–3 p)	Barnton (FDS)
Carlisle City (FDN)	11–2	Eccleshall (FDS)
Maine Road (FDS)	1–1 (12–13 p)	Garstang (FDN)
Rylands (FDS)	0–2	Avro (FDN)
Vauxhall Motors (FDS)	2–3	AFC Liverpool (FDN)
Wythenshawe Amateurs (FDS)	1–2	Cheadle Heath Nomads (FDS)

=== Quarter-finals ===
Home team (division)	Score	Away team (division)
Avro (FDN)	2–1	Garstang (FDN)
Carlisle City (FDN)	2–1	Ellesmere Rangers (FDS)
Cheadle Heath Nomads (FDS)	1–3	Sandbach United (FDS)
AFC Liverpool (FDN)	1–1 (2–3 p)	Bacup Borough (FDN)

=== Semi-finals ===
The semi-finals were decided on aggregate score from two legs played

Tie	Home team (division)	Score	Away team (division)
1	Bacup Borough (FDN)	0–2	Avro (FDN)
1	Avro (FDN)	3–1	Bacup Borough (FDN)
1	Avro won 5–1 on aggregate		
2	Carlisle City (FDN)	2–4	Sandbach United (FDS)
2	Sandbach United (FDS)	5–1	Carlisle City (FDN)
2	Sandbach United won 9–3 on aggregate		

=== Final ===
Team (division)	Score	Team (division)
Played 6 May 2019 at Vauxhall Motors F.C., Syncreon Arena Rivacre Road
Avro (FDN)	2–4	Sandbach United (FDS)

source: "First Division Trophy: 2018/19 Season". nwcfl.com.

== First Division Champions Cup ==
The 2018–19 First Division Champions Cup was contested by the champions of the First Division North and First Division South. The single match, played at neutral venue A.F.C. Darwen, was won by Rylands the southern section champions.

30 April 2019	Longridge Town (FDN)	0–3	Rylands (FDS)	Darwen
		Report	Stephen Wolhuter 10'; Stuart Wellstead 24'; Tom McNamara 73'	Stadium: AFC Darwen, WEC Anchor Ground

Source: "First Division Champions Cup Results: 2018/19 Season". nwcfl.com.
