= 2019–20 North West Counties Football League =

The 2019–20 North West Counties Football League season was the 38th in the history of the North West Counties Football League, a football competition in England.

The league comprised three divisions, the Premier Division (at level 9 of the English football league system, Step 5 National League System) and for the second season two regional divisions at level 10 or Step 6: the First Division North and First Division South with the champions of each Division competing in a single match for the First Division Champions Cup. Additionally there were two cup competitions: the League Challenge Cup (known as the Macron Challenge Cup for sponsorship reasons), a knockout competition open to all the league's clubs; and the First Division Trophy (known for sponsorship reasons as the PlayerMatch.com Cup), a knockout trophy competition for First Division clubs only.

Prior to the season the FA outlined plans to continue restructuring the National League System which would create one new division at Step 4 and two at Step 5. This entailed three teams to be promoted from the Premier Division to Step 4 and four from each of the First Divisions North and South to geographically suitable Step 5 divisions.

As a consequence of the COVID-19 pandemic the season's competition, with most of the fixtures completed, was suspended after matches played on 14 March and subsequently formally abandoned on 26 March 2020; all results from the season were expunged with no promotion or relegation to take place to, from, or within the league. The decision stood despite sixty-six non-league clubs sending an open letter to the Football Association on 30 March 2020, requesting that they reconsider their decision. The planned changes to the football pyramid were also abandoned and not implemented until the 2021–22 season.

== Premier Division ==
North West Counties Football League Premier Division
- Season: 2019–20
- Teams: 20
- Matches: 292
- Goals: 1,029 (3.52 per match)
- Average attendance: 150
- All statistics correct as of 14 March 2020 (at abandonment).

At the end of the previous season 4 clubs had left the division:

- Abbey Hey, relegated to First Division South
- City of Liverpool, promoted to the Northern Premier League Division One North West
- Silsden, transferred to the Northern Counties East League Premier Division
- West Didsbury & Chorlton, relegated to First Division South

The 2019–20 Premier Division club allocations from the FA Leagues Committee (subject to appeal) were announced on 19 May 2019: and its constitution ratified at the league's AGM on 15 June 2019. The division comprised 20 clubs, 16 remaining from the previous season plus 4 additions:

- Avro, promoted as champions from First Division North
- Longridge Town, promoted as best First Division runner-up (from First Division North)
- Rylands, promoted as champions from First Division South
- Skelmersdale United, relegated from the Northern Premier League Division One West

=== League table (at abandonment) ===
Pos	Team	Pld	W	D	L	GF	GA	GD	Pts
1	1874 Northwich	29	22	5	2	79	27	+52	71
2	Rylands	30	20	3	7	62	32	+30	63
3	Bootle	27	19	2	6	66	37	+29	59 (Note: Skelmerdale v Bootle match on 29 February (result 2–1) was declared void and is not included in the table.)
4	Charnock Richard	31	20	2	9	73	50	+23	59 (Note: Charnock Richard were deducted three points for fielding an ineligible player in a match won on 12 November.)
5	Ashton Athletic	29	16	5	8	64	38	+26	53
6	Longridge Town	26	17	2	7	62	44	+18	53
7	Runcorn Town	31	14	9	8	55	41	+14	51
8	Irlam	27	13	4	10	50	42	+8	43
9	Squires Gate	32	13	4	15	56	68	−12	43
10	Northwich Victoria	28	11	7	10	57	43	+14	40
11	Whitchurch Alport	29	10	8	11	43	44	−1	38
12	Avro	30	11	4	15	49	55	−6	37
13	Winsford United	29	9	5	15	51	57	−6	32
14	Congleton Town	30	8	7	15	54	60	−6	31
15	Barnoldswick Town	27	8	4	15	40	62	−22	28
16	Skelmersdale United	30	7	6	17	48	60	−12	27
17	Padiham	28	7	5	16	31	55	−24	26
18	Burscough	30	7	5	18	25	67	−42	26
19	Litherland REMYCA	31	5	7	19	30	77	−47	22
20	Hanley Town	30	5	6	19	34	70	−36	21

Source: "Final Tables, Season 2019/20". nwcfl.com., "North West Counties League - North West Counties League Premier Division: 2019 – 20: League Table". nonleaguematters.co.uk.
Rules for classification: 1) Points; 2) Goal difference; 3) Number of goals scored; 4) Number of matches won; 5) Head-to-head results

=== Results (up to abandonment) ===
Home \ Away	18N	ASH	AVR	BWT	BTL	BUR	CHR	CON	HAN	IRL	LIT	LON	NWV	PAD	RNT	RYL	SKE	SQG	WHI	WIN
1874 Northwich		0–0	–	0–0	2–0	–	5–0	2–1	2–1	2–4	1–0	3–2	–	4–1	1–1	2–1	1–0	24 Mar	31 Mar	3–1
Ashton Athletic	0–1		2–1	–	2–3	3–1	–	–	2–1	1–0	–	–	3–1	0–1	4–1	1–3	2–2	3–2	3–3	24 Mar
Avro	1–1	1–2		3–4	–	5–2	–	1–0	3–1	–	0–1	1–2	1–2	0–2	2–2	0–1	3–2	3–2	1–2	2–2
Barnoldswick T	4–8	1–0	–		–	4–2	21 Mar	3–3	3–1	0–3	2–0	3–1	–	17 Mar	1–2	–	–	2–2	2–4	2–1
Bootle	1–4	0–4	7–2	3–1		4–1	–	21 Mar	1–1	3–0	1–0	3–2	27 Mar	–	4–0	0–3	1–1	7–3	1–0	1–0
Burscough	0–2	1–1	0–1	3–2	0–5		1–2	1–0	2–1	1–1	0–2	1–1	–	0–1	0–1	0–0	–	2–1	2–0	1–3
Charnock Richard	0–5	3–2	1–3	2–1	3–1	0–1		1–3	4–0	2–0	4–3	–	2–2	2–0	24 Mar	3–1	4–0	–	4–0	4–1
Congleton Town	–	0–0	1–5	5–0	0–3	1–1	3–1		–	–	4–3	1–3	2–4	4–0	4–2	–	3–1	2–3	0–1	4–3
Hanley Town	0–4	2–6	0–2	3–0	0–4	–	0–1	4–3		24 Mar	0–0	1–3	2–2	28 Mar	0–3	2–1	–	1–3	–	21 Mar
Irlam	–	2–4	0–2	3–2	31 Mar	21 Mar	2–4	1–0	1–0		2–2	4–2	17 Mar	–	1–2	1–2	4–0	–	4–2	1–0
Litherland R	0–9	1–7	0–2	1–0	–	–	2–5	3–0	4–1	28 Mar		0–5	21 Mar	0–2	–	0–3	0–3	0–0	0–3	1–3
Longridge Town	2–1	2–3	–	–	28 Mar	25 Mar	3–2	–	4–3	4–2	3–2		2–1	2–1	21 Mar	4–1	1–0	–	–	5–3
Northwich Vic	3–3	–	1–0	2–0	1–2	6–1	2–3	1–0	1–1	3–3	8–0	1–2		3–1	–	0–2	2–0	2–3	0–1	1–1
Padiham	–	0–1	1–1	–	1–3	1–0	1–1	–	2–0	0–2	1–1	2–0	1–1		0–2	1–3	2–4	1–2	1–4	–
Runcorn Town	2–3	0–1	4–1	3–0	2–0	5–0	1–3	2–2	1–1	1–2	1–1	3–1	2–0	3–3		–	0–0	2–1	18 Mar	2–2
Rylands	21 Mar	2–1	5–0	0–1	2–3	–	2–2	4–2	–	1–0	1–1	31 Mar	1–2	5–1	1–1		2–0	2–1	2–1	–
Skelmersdale U	2–3	21 Mar	28 Mar	3–0	(2–1) (Note: Skelmersdale v Bootle, match of 29 February 2020 (score 2–1) declared void)	4–0	2–4	2–1	2–2	0–1	–	1–4	2–4	3–2	–	2–3		3–3	2–3	0–1
Squires Gate	0–4	0–4	2–1	3–1	2–4	0–1	2–1	2–1	1–2	0–5	1–0	–	2–1	21 Mar	2–0	0–3	3–1		0–0	3–1
Whitchurch Alport	0–1	–	21 Mar	1–1	0–1	4–0	0–3	1–1	4–1	1–1	1–1	1–2	23 Mar	–	0–1	0–2	1–1	3–2		–
Winsford United	0–2	3–2	3–1	28 Mar	–	6–0	0–2	2–2	1–2	–	4–1	0–0	–	4–1	0–1	0–2	0–5	5–4	1–2	

Source: "Premier Division Results 2019/20". nwcfl.com. and fixtures
Legend: Blue = home team win; Yellow = draw; Red = away team win.

=== Stadia and locations ===
Locations of the 2019–20 North West Counties Football League Premier Division teams

Team	Stadium
1874 Northwich	Townfield (groundshare with Barnton)
Ashton Athletic	Brockstedes Park
Avro	Whitebank Stadium, Oldham
Barnoldswick Town	Greenberfield Lane
Bootle	New Bucks Park
Burscough	Victoria Park
Charnock Richard	Mossie Park
Congleton Town	Ivy Gardens
Hanley Town	Abbey Lane
Irlam	Silver Street
Litherland REMYCA	Litherland Sports Park
Longridge Town	Mike Riding Ground
Northwich Victoria	Wincham Park (groundshare with Witton Albion)
Padiham	Arbories Memorial Sports Ground
Runcorn Town	Pavilions Sports Complex
Rylands	Gorsey Lane
Skelmersdale United	Valerie Park
Squires Gate	School Road
Whitchurch Alport	Yockings Park
Winsford United	Barton Stadium

== First Division North ==
North West Counties Football League First Division North
- Season: 2019–20
- Teams: 20
- Matches: 291
- Goals: 1,203 (4.13 per match)
- Average attendance: 99
- All statistics correct as of 14 March 2020 (at abandonment).

At the end of the previous season 3 clubs had left the division:

- Avro, promoted to the Premier Division
- Carlisle City, transferred to the Northern League Division Two
- Longridge Town, promoted to the Premier Division

The 2019–20 First Division North club allocations from the FA Leagues Committee (subject to appeal) were announced on 19 May 2019: and its constitution only provisionally ratified at the league's AGM on 15 June 2019 as a delayed appeal hearing, by Carlisle City who were objecting to their lateral movement to the Northern League, was outstanding. The appeal was rejected and the previously ratified provisional league constitution adopted. The division comprised 20 clubs, 17 remaining from the previous season plus 3 additions:

- Emley, transferred from the Northern Counties East League Division One
- Golcar United, promoted from the West Riding Amateur League
- Pilkington, promoted from the Cheshire League

After the season Emley AFC were transferred back at their request to the Northern Counties East League, having spent one season in this league.

=== League table (at abandonment) ===
Pos	Team	Pld	W	D	L	GF	GA	GD	Pts	Season End Notes
1	Lower Breck	29	21	4	4	95	38	+57	67	
2	AFC Liverpool	29	17	6	6	91	43	+48	57	
3	Shelley	31	17	6	8	67	47	+20	57	
4	Emley AFC	27	17	5	5	68	43	+25	56	Transferred to Northern Counties; East League Division One
5	Golcar United	28	14	4	10	71	49	+22	46	
6	Ashton Town	29	14	4	11	68	54	+14	46	
7	Prestwich Heys	29	14	4	11	49	48	+1	46	
8	Pilkington	30	14	2	14	62	61	+1	44	
9	AFC Blackpool	29	13	2	14	58	60	−2	41	
10	Holker Old Boys	30	12	4	14	55	63	−8	40	
11	Daisy Hill	31	11	5	15	63	86	−23	38	
12	Chadderton	29	11	3	15	56	66	−10	36	
13	AFC Darwen	32	14	4	14	65	74	−9	35 (Note: AFC Darwen had 11 points deducted for using an ineligible player in numerous matches.)	
14	Nelson	28	10	5	13	47	57	−10	35	
15	Garstang	29	11	1	17	57	69	−12	34	
16	Cleator Moor Celtic	26	8	7	11	52	64	−12	31	
17	Atherton Laburnum Rovers	29	8	7	14	36	58	−22	31	
18	Bacup Borough	27	7	6	14	50	58	−8	27	
19	Steeton	29	7	5	17	40	75	−35	26	
20	St Helens Town	31	7	4	20	53	90	−37	25	

Source: "Final Tables, Season 2019/20". nwcfl.com., "North West Counties League - North West Counties League Division One North: 2019 – 20: League Table". nonleaguematters.co.uk.
Rules for classification: 1) Points; 2) Goal difference; 3) Number of goals scored; 4) Number of matches won; 5) Head-to-head results

=== Results (up to abandonment) ===
Home \ Away	ABL	ADR	ALV	ASH	ALR	BAC	CHA	CLE	DSH	EML	GAR	GOL	HOL	LOW	NEL	PIL	PRE	SHE	STH	STE
AFC Blackpool		2–4	2–0	2–0	2–3	3–2	1–3	2–2	–	0–3	–	1–2	1–1	2–1	1–5	4–1	4–1	3–1	28 Mar	1–2
AFC Darwen	2–1		1–0	2–1	4–1	3–1	4–3	0–3	3–3	2–3	3–2	–	3–0	0–4	1–1	1–5	2–1	0–2	21 Mar	–
AFC Liverpool	4–2	8–0		25 Mar	4–1	1–0	4–1	4–2	7–1	4–4	2–1	2–2	8–2	–	–	3–3	3–0	1–2	6–2	8–0
Ashton Town	2–0	–	5–1		28 Mar	5–3	2–3	–	3–0	2–2	1–2	1–6	1–0	–	5–0	3–2	–	5–0	4–1	1–1
Atherton Lab R	1–0	2–2	2–0	1–2		1–1	0–3	2–2	0–2	–	1–2	2–1	–	0–2	0–2	0–2	–	0–4	3–2	3–1
Bacup Boro'	–	1–2	0–0	2–0	1–3		5–1	–	–	2–2	–	–	4–2	1–2	2–3	1–0	–	0–1	4–0	27 Mar
Chadderton	2–3	4–3	31 Mar	0–2	–	3–4		7–0	1–1	0–1	2–1	2–1	1–2	0–3	–	–	1–1	1–1	3–2	5–3
Cleator Moor C	–	1–3	1–3	0–3	21 Mar	3–2	4–1		3–1	2–3	3–4	4–4	–	3–3	–	2–2	3–5	3–1	24 Mar	–
Daisy Hill	1–2	4–1	1–4	–	–	3–1	21 Mar	–		2–4	3–0	1–0	1–3	0–6	2–3	3–1	3–2	1–3	2–1	0–0
Emley AFC	4–1	3–1	–	–	2–3	–	1–0	1–1	4–2		2–1	1–4	3–2	28 Mar	2–1	–	4–1	1–3	–	5–1
Garstang	–	2–5	0–2	4–2	–	4–4	–	–	7–1	0–2		1–5	–	2–0	2–0	0–8	2–3	1–2	–	3–1
Golcar United	1–3	3–1	17 Mar	5–3	–	3–3	–	1–1	–	–			2–1	21 Mar	5–3	28 Mar	2–1	1–0	5–0	2–3
Holker OB	2–6	1–6	–	3–3	1–0	2–0	–	1–3	8–0	21 Mar	0–2	2–1		1–2	1–1	2–0	1–0	4–1	–	1–3
Lower Breck	4–3	1–0	3–3	4–3	6–1	–	5–1	–	4–3	3–1	5–1	5–2	4–1		4–1	3–0	2–2	–	5–1	–
Nelson	1–2	–	1–4	3–1	1–1	–	1–0	2–0	3–6	31 Mar	21 Mar	3–2	28 Mar	–		2–3	1–3	0–0	1–1	0–1
Pilkington	1–2	–	–	0–2	3–1	4–1	1–2	0–3	5–1	3–2	2–1	1–5	3–2	3–1	3–2		21 Mar	–	3–2	2–0
Prestwich Heys	–	2–1	1–0	3–1	2–0	–	–	31 Mar	0–3	0–0	3–1	1–0	1–2	0–4	0–2	4–0		2–2	2–1	–
Shelley	21 Mar	4–1	–	–	1–1	3–0	5–0	3–2	1–1	–	2–1	–	2–3	2–0	5–3	4–1	1–2		0–2	5–2
St Helens T	4–2	3–2	2–2	3–1	2–2	1–2	4–2	6–0	3–8	2–3	1–5	0–2	0–0	0–8	0–1	–	1–3	2–3		3–1
Steeton	18 Mar	1–2	1–3	1–3	1–1	21 Mar	1–4	0–1	–	0–5	1–4	2–1	1–4	1–1	–	2–0	1–3	3–3	5–1	

Source: "First Division North Results 2019/20". nwcfl.com. and fixtures
Legend: Blue = home team win; Yellow = draw; Red = away team win.

=== Stadia and locations ===
Locations of the 2019–20 North West Counties Football League First Division North teams

Team	Stadium
AFC Blackpool	The Mechanics
AFC Darwen	The Anchor Ground
AFC Liverpool	Rossett Park, Crosby (groundshare with Marine)
Ashton Town	Edge Green Street
Atherton Laburnum Rovers	Crilly Park
Bacup Borough	West View
Chadderton	MCA Stadium
Cleator Moor Celtic	McGrath Park
Daisy Hill	New Sirs, Westhoughton
Emley	Welfare Ground
Garstang	The Riverside
Golcar United	Longfield Avenue
Holker Old Boys	Rakesmoor Lane, Barrow-in-Furness
Lower Breck	Anfield Sports and Community Centre
Nelson	Victoria Park
Pilkington	Ruskin Drive Sportsground
Prestwich Heys	Adie Moran Park
Shelley Community	Storthes Hall Park
St Helens Town	Ruskin Drive Sportsground
Steeton	Cougar Park

== First Division South ==
North West Counties Football League First Division South
- Season: 2019–20
- Teams: 20
- Matches: 289
- Goals: 1,009 (3.49 per match)
- Average attendance: 106
- All statistics correct as of 14 March 2020 (at abandonment).

At the end of the previous season 2 clubs had left the division:

- Rylands, promoted to the Premier Division
- Stone Dominoes, relegated to the Staffordshire County Senior League

The 2019–20 First Division South club allocations from the FA Leagues Committee (subject to appeal) were announced on 19 May 2019 and the constitution ratified at the league's AGM on 15 June 2019. The division comprised 20 clubs, 18 remaining from the previous season plus 2 additions (both relegated from the Premier Division):

- Abbey Hey
- West Didsbury & Chorlton

Prior to the announcement of the allocations for the following season FC Oswestry Town folded and resigned from the league.

=== League table (at abandonment) ===
Pos	Team	Pld	W	D	L	GF	GA	GD	Pts	Season End Notes
1	Vauxhall Motors	31	27	1	3	83	28	+55	82	
2	FC Oswestry Town	30	21	3	6	68	37	+31	66	Resigned after the season
3	Stone Old Alleynians	30	18	5	7	65	32	+33	59	
4	Wythenshawe Town	27	17	5	5	71	25	+46	56	
5	Abbey Hey	29	16	5	8	56	44	+12	53	
6	West Didsbury & Chorlton	28	14	5	9	51	34	+17	47	
7	Eccleshall	29	14	3	12	55	47	+8	45	
8	Cheadle Town	30	13	5	12	50	47	+3	44	
9	Stockport Town	29	13	4	12	57	52	+5	37 (Note: Stockport Town had six points deducted.StockportTown at the Football Club History Database)	
10	Maine Road	30	11	5	14	57	54	+3	38	
11	Cheadle Heath Nomads	30	10	5	15	44	59	−15	35	
12	Wythenshawe Amateurs	26	10	4	12	38	34	+4	34	
13	Cammell Laird 1907	29	9	7	13	56	58	−2	34	
14	New Mills	28	9	6	13	49	63	−14	33	
15	Abbey Hulton United	31	10	1	20	40	80	−40	31	
16	Sandbach United	26	10	0	16	37	45	−8	30	
17	Barnton	29	9	1	19	30	59	−29	28	
18	Ellesmere Rangers	28	7	5	16	37	73	−36	26	
19	Alsager Town	28	6	7	15	31	63	−32	25	
20	St Martins	30	5	3	22	34	75	−41	18	

Source: "Final Tables, Season 2019/20". nwcfl.com., "2019–20 North West Counties League". fchd.info.
Rules for classification: 1) Points; 2) Goal difference; 3) Number of goals scored; 4) Number of matches won; 5) Head-to-head results

=== Results (up to abandonment) ===
Home \ Away	AHY	AHU	ALS	BNT	CAM	CHN	CHT	ECC	ELL	OSW	MNR	NWM	SAN	STM	STK	SOA	VAU	WDC	WYA	WYT
Abbey Hey		2–0	1–1	4–2	2–1	1–4	–	21 Mar	24 Mar	1–1	2–1	–	3–0	3–1	2–0	2–1	2–4	1–3	3–3	1–1
Abbey Hulton U	–		28 Mar	1–0	1–1	1–3	1–3	3–2	0–2	0–4	2–1	2–6	5–3	1–4	2–0	14 Mar	2–5	–	0–1	0–9
Alsager Town	0–3	3–2		24 Mar	0–3	1–4	21 Mar	0–3	2–2	0–3	1–2	0–2	2–0	1–0	1–2	2–3	–	1–2	0–0	–
Barnton	2–3	0–2	1–1		2–3	0–2	1–0	0–2	0–2	4 Mar	2–3	–	3–2	1–0	11 Mar	1–6	1–4	0–1	–	2–1
Cammell L 1907	31 Mar	3–1	2–3	0–2		1–1	2–0	–	2–2	–	4–1	4–5	–	4–2	2–3	21 Mar	2–3	1–2	24 Mar	3–3
Cheadle Heath N	0–1	5–1	1–2	1–2	0–1		–	1–0	3–0	2–4	–	2–0	1–4	3–2	1–5	1–1	–	0–5	1–1	–
Cheadle Town	0–1	4–1	1–2	–	–	3–1		2–2	3–0	1–5	2–1	1–1	1–0	0–1	2–1	1–2	0–1	2–1	–	0–7
Eccleshall	4–1	2–0	8–1	–	2–4	2–0	0–4		9–0	0–5	1–0	1–2	–	3–2	2–0	–	0–1	0–4	0–4	25 Mar
Ellesmere R	2–3	0–2	–	0–3	2–2	–	28 Mar	–		0–1	1–6	2–0	2–0	2–0	0–2	1–5	1–2	3–2	7 Mar	1–2
FC Oswestry T	2–1	1–0	5–1	2–1	4–1	4–0	1–3	–	3–3		2–1	–	–	2–1	0–1	1–1	2–1	2–1	2–3	2–1
Maine Road	2–2	1–2	1–1	3–0	3–0	4–1	2–2	–	6–1	3–1		1–2	1–2	28 Mar	–	0–3	1–3	–	1–1	30 Mar
New Mills	–	6–1	1–1	1–0	4–4	1–1	1–2	0–3	21 Mar	2–3	1–1		1–3	–	–	1–2	1–3	3–3	–	2–4
Sandbach United	0–1	1–0	3–1	0–1	0–3	–	24 Mar	1–2	–	4–0	–	0–2		–	5–2	0–1	1–2	28 Mar	1–3	–
St Martins	–	–	2–2	1–2	2–0	21 Mar	1–6	0–2	4–2	–	1–2	3–1	2–2		2–3	1–4	0–4	2–2	0–3	0–0
Stockport Town	2–1	1–5	–	–	4–1	1–3	2–2	2–2	2–2	3–2	8–2	4–1	30 Mar	2–0		1–1	2–3	2–1	1–2	1–2
Stone Old All.	0–1	2–1	–	2–1	1–1	4–1	1–1	3–1	4–0	0–1	0–2	–	3–0	5–0	–		1–3	0–1	2–1	–
Vauxhall Motors	2–1	21 Mar	2–0	4–0	–	2–1	4–2	–	2–4	24 Mar	3–1	8–0	–	5–0	2–0	–		3–0	–	1–2
W Didsbury & Ch.	–	5–0	4–1	21 Mar	2–1	0–0	2–1	4–0	–	17 Mar	0–3	–	31 Mar	–	1–0	0–2	0–1		2–1	1–1
Wythenshawe Am	2–5	0–1	–	3–0	1–0	28 Mar	0–1	0–2	17 Mar	0–1	–	0–2	0–2	5–0	21 Mar	2–4	1–2	1–0		–
Wythenshawe T	3–2	–	–	5–0	28 Mar	5–0	2–0	3–0	3–0	1–2	3–1	4–0	1–2	2–0	–	3–1	0–1	2–2	1–0	

Source: "First Division South Results 2019/20". nwcfl.com. and fixtures
Legend: Blue = home team win; Yellow = draw; Red = away team win.

=== Stadia and locations ===

Locations of the 2019–20 North West Counties Football League First Division South teams
Locations of North West Counties First Division South 2019-20 teams (Greater Manchester)

Team	Stadium
Abbey Hey	The Abbey Stadium, Gorton
Abbey Hulton United	Birches Head Road
Alsager Town	Wood Park Stadium
Barnton	Townfield
Cammell Laird 1907	Kirklands, Birkenhead
Cheadle Heath Nomads	The Heath
Cheadle Town	Park Road Stadium
Eccleshall	Pershall Park
Ellesmere Rangers	Beech Grove
FC Oswestry Town	Park Hall Stadium
Maine Road	Brantingham Road, Chorlton
New Mills	Church Lane
Sandbach United	Sandbach Community Football Centre
St Martins	The Venue, Oswestry
Stockport Town	Stockport Sports Village
Stone Alleynians	Yarnfield Lane
Vauxhall Motors	Rivacre Park, Ellesmere Port
West Didsbury & Chorlton	Brookburn Road, Chorlton
Wythenshawe Amateurs	Hollyhedge Park
Wythenshawe Town	Ericstan Stadium

== League Challenge Cup ==
The 2019–20 League Challenge Cup (known as the Macron Challenge Cup for sponsorship reasons) was a knockout competition open to all the league's 60 clubs. The twice delayed final (unusually played at the home of one of the participants, Runcorn Town, on 24 July 2021), contested by Premier Division clubs, was won 6–3 by 1874 Northwich who defeated Runcorn Town. It was 1874 Northwich's second successive win and the first occasion that the trophy had been retained.

=== First round ===
From the 60 clubs in the open draw 28 first round ties featuring 56 clubs were drawn. Four clubs, Alsager Town (FDS), Cheadle Town (FDS), Longridge Town (PD) and Whitchurch Alport (PD) received byes to the second round.

(Appended to club names in the results listings below: '(PD)'=Premier Division club; '(FDN)'=First Division North club; '(FDS)'=First Division South club)

Home team (division)	Score	Away team (division)
Abbey Hey (FDS)	2–1	Holker Old Boys (FDN)
Ashton Town (FDN)	5–1	Golcar United (FDN)
Avro (PD)	0–6	Vauxhall Motors (FDS)
Bacup Borough (FDN)	1–1 (3–1 p)	Charnock Richard (PD)
Bootle (PD)	3–2	Eccleshall (FDS)
Burscough (PD)	0–5	Ashton Athletic (PD)
Cheadle Heath Nomads (FDS)	1–5	1874 Northwich (PD)
Congleton Town (PD)	2–3 (Note: AFC Darwen fielded ineligible player, and forfeited a place in next season's competition.)	AFC Darwen (FDN)
Daisy Hill (FDN)	3–6	AFC Blackpool (FDN)
Ellesmere Rangers (FDS)	3–2	Cleator Moor Celtic (FDN)
Emley AFC (FDN)	2–1	Squires Gate (PD)
Garstang (FDN)	1–1 (4–2 p)	Stockport Town (FDS)
Hanley Town (PD)	1–2	Abbey Hulton United (FDS)
Lower Breck (FDN)	2–1	Cammell Laird 1907 (FDS)
Maine Road (FDS)	3–0	FC Oswestry Town (FDS)
Northwich Victoria (PD)	3–1	Barnoldswick Town (PD)
Padiham (PD)	9–1	St Martins (FDS)
Pilkington (FDN)	1–3	Steeton (FDN)
Prestwich Heys (FDN)	1–0	Winsford United (PD)
Runcorn Town (PD)	5–0	Atherton Laburnum Rovers (FDN)
Rylands (PD)	5–0	Barnton (FDS)
Sandbach United (FDS)	2–4	AFC Liverpool (FDN)
Shelley (FDN)	3–2	Wythenshawe Town (FDS)
Skelmersdale United (PD)	1–3	Irlam (PD)
St Helens Town	2–1	Nelson (FDN)
Stone Old Alleynians (FDS)	1–2	Litherland REMYCA (PD)
West Didsbury & Chorlton (FDS)	3–1	New Mills (FDS)
Wythenshawe Amateurs (FDS)	2–1	Chadderton (FDN)
The remaining 4 clubs received byes to the second round

=== Second round ===
Home team (division)	Score	Away team (division)
Abbey Hey (FDS)	2–1	Bacup Borough (FDN)
Abbey Hulton United (FDS)	0–2 (Note: Played at AFC Liverpool's home ground, following postponements)	AFC Liverpool (FDN)
Ashton Athletic (PD)	4–2	Ashton Town (FDN)
Emley AFC (FDN)	1–2	Ellesmere Rangers (FDS)
Garstang (FDN)	4–2	Steeton (FDN)
Irlam (PD)	0–4 (Note: Played at 1874 Northwich's home ground, following postponements)	1874 Northwich (PD)
Litherland REMYCA (PD)	2–0	Bootle (PD)
Longridge Town (PD)	0–3	Vauxhall Motors (FDS)
Lower Breck	2–4	Maine Road (FDS)
Northwich Victoria (PD)	0–2	Runcorn Town (PD)
Prestwich Heys (FDN)	2–1	AFC Darwen (FDN)
Rylands (PD)	4–3	Padiham (PD)
St Helens Town (FDN)	0–1	AFC Blackpool (FDN)
West Didsbury & Chorlton (FDS)	6–1	Alsager Town (FDS)
Whitchurch Alport (PD)	2–3	Shelley (FDN)
Wythenshawe Amateurs (FDS)	3–2	Cheadle Town (FDS)

=== Third round ===
Home team (division)	Score	Away team (division)
AFC Blackpool (FDN)	1–2	Ellesmere Rangers (FDS)
Ashton Athletic (PD)	6–0	Wythenshawe Amateurs (FDS)
Garstang (FDN)	0–2 (Note: Played at Maine Road's home ground, following postponements)	Maine Road (FDS)
Prestwich Heys (FDN)	0–2	AFC Liverpool (FDN)
Rylands (PD)	1–1 (2–3 p)	1874 Northwich (PD)
Shelley (FDN)	3–2	Abbey Hey (FDS)
Vauxhall Motors (FDS)	1–2	Litherland REMYCA (PD)
West Didsbury & Chorlton (FDS)	1–4	Runcorn Town (PD)

=== Quarter-finals ===
Home team (division)	Score	Away team (division)
Ashton Athletic (PD)	2–2 (2–4 p)	Runcorn Town (PD)
Litherland REMYCA (PD)	1–5	AFC Liverpool (FDN)
Maine Road (FDS)	0–4	1874 Northwich (PD)
Shelley (FDN)	3–2	Ellesmere Rangers (FDS)

=== Semi-finals ===
The semi-finals matches were delayed and played as a single ties in September 2020, at the start of the 2020–21 season.

Home team (division)	Score	Away team (division)
AFC Liverpool (FDN)	3–3 (2–4 p)	Runcorn Town (PD)
Shelley (FDN)	1–6	1874 Northwich (PD)

=== Final ===
The delayed final was played prior to the start of the 2021–22 season.

Team (division)	Score	Team (division)
Played on 24 July 2021 at Runcorn Town F.C.
Runcorn Town (PD)	3–6	1874 Northwich (PD)

source: "League Challenge Cup: 2019/20 Season". nwcfl.com.

== First Division Trophy ==
The 2019–20 First Division Trophy (known as the PlayerMatch.com Cup for sponsorship reasons) was a knockout competition for the 40 First Division clubs only. The delayed final, unusually played at the home of one of the participants Sandbach United, was won by Sandbach United who defeated AFC Liverpool 4–3 in a penalty shoot-out after the match had finished 2–2. It was Sandbach United's second successive win and the second occasion that the trophy had been retained (the first had been by their opponents AFC Liverpool in 2010).

=== First round ===
(Appended to club names in the results listings below: '(FDN)'=First Division North club; '(FDS)'=First Division South club)

Home team	Score	Away team
Abbey Hey (FDS)	3–2	Bacup Borough (FDN)
Abbey Hulton United (FDS)	4–1	Ellesmere Rangers (FDS)
AFC Liverpool (FDN)	3–1	Shelley (FDN)
Cleator Moor Celtic (FDN)	1–2	Cheadle Town (FDS)
Holker Old Boys (FDN)	0–3	AFC Blackpool (FDN)
Lower Breck (FDN)	6–2	Vauxhall Motors (FDS)
New Mills (FDS)	3–3 (4–5 p)	Eccleshall (FDS)
Steeton (FDN)	0–0 (3–5 p)	FC Oswestry Town (FDS)
The remaining 24 clubs received byes to the second round

=== Second round ===
Home team	Score	Away team
Abbey Hulton United (FDS)	1–2	Cheadle Heath Nomads (FDS)
Alsager Town (FDS)	2–5	Cheadle Town (FDS)
Ashton Town (FDN)	9–2	Atherton Laburnum Rovers (FDN)
Barnton (FDS)	0–4	Abbey Hey (FDS)
Cammell Laird 1907 (FDS)	0–0 (6–7 p)	Sandbach United (FDS)
Chadderton (FDN)	0–1	Pilkington (FDN)
Daisy Hill (FDN)	5–3	Maine Road (FDS)
Emley AFC (FDN)	4–0	AFC Blackpool (FDN)
Garstang (FDN)	2–3 (3–5 p)	FC Oswestry Town (FDS)
Golcar United (FDN)	4–4 (3–4 p)	Wythenshawe Town (FDS)
Lower Breck (FDN)	6–0	Eccleshall (FDS)
St Helens Town (FDN)	8–3	AFC Darwen (FDN)
St Martins (FDS)	0–5	AFC Liverpool (FDN)
Stone Old Alleynians (FDS)	2–1	Prestwich Heys (FDN)
West Didsbury & Chorlton (FDS)	4–0	Nelson (FDN)
Wythenshawe Amateurs (FDS)	3–2	Stockport Town (FDS)

=== Third round ===
Home team	Score	Away team
AFC Liverpool (FDN)	2–1	Pilkington (FDN)
Ashton Town (FDN)	2–2 (8–9 p)	Abbey Hey (FDS)
Cheadle Town (FDS)	4–2	Wythenshawe Amateurs (FDS)
Emley AFC (FDN)	6–1	Daisy Hill (FDN)
FC Oswestry Town (FDS)	W–x (Note: Tie awarded to FC Oswestry Town as Lower Breck used an ineligible player and were eliminated (match result: 0–1))	Lower Breck (FDN)
Sandbach United (FDS)	2–1	Stone Old Alleynians (FDS)
St Helens Town (FDN)	1–2	West Didsbury & Chorlton (FDS)
Wythenshawe Town (FDS)	4–1	Cheadle Heath Nomads (FDS)

=== Quarter-finals ===
Home team	Score	Away team
Abbey Hey (FDS)	1–3	Wythenshawe Town (FDS)
AFC Liverpool (FDN)	3–0	Cheadle Town (FDS)
FC Oswestry Town (FDS)	1–0	Emley AFC (FDN)
West Didsbury & Chorlton (FDS)	0–2	Sandbach United (FDS)

=== Semi–finals ===
The semi-finals were decided on aggregate score from two legs played. The single second leg tie played was delayed until 5 September 2020.

Tie	Home team	Score	Away team
1	FC Oswestry Town (FDS)	0–3	AFC Liverpool (FDN)
1	AFC Liverpool(FDN)	– (Note: Not played owing to the earlier resignation of FC Oswestry Town)	FC Oswestry Town(FDS)
1	Tie awarded to AFC Liverpool following the earlier resignation of FC Oswestry Town		
2	Wythenshawe Town (FDS)	1–2	Sandbach United (FDS)
2	Sandbach United (FDS)	1–0	Wythenshawe Town (FDS)
2	Sandbach United won 3–1 on aggregate		

=== Final ===
Owing to the premature conclusion of the 2019–20 season the final was played on 12 September 2020

Team	Score	Team
Played on 12 September 2020 at Sandbach United F.C.
Sandbach United (FDS)	2–2 (4–3 p)	AFC Liverpool (FDN)

source: "First Division Trophy: 2019/20 Season". nwcfl.com.

== First Division Champions Cup ==
The 2019–20 First Division Champions Cup would have been contested by the winners of First Division North and First Division South at the end of the season however, owing to the abandonment of the league programme, it was cancelled.
