= Louis Moss =

Barbadian footballer

Personal information
- Date of birth: 23 October 1992 (age 34)
- Place of birth: Chester, England
- Height: 1.73 m (5 ft 8 in)
- Position: Midfielder

Team information
- Current team: Colwyn Bay

Youth career
- Wrexham

Senior career*
Years	Team	Apps	(Gls)
2010–2012	Wrexham	2	(1)
2012	Ventura County Fusion	1	(0)
2012–2013	Vauxhall Motors	18	(1)
2013–2015	Colwyn Bay	49	(3)
2015–2016	Chester Nomads		
2016–2017	Runcorn Town		
2017–2018	Chester Nomads		
2018	Oswestry Town		
2018	Peninsula Strikers	1	(0)
2018–	Oswestry Town		

International career^{‡}
- Barbados U15
- Barbados U17
2011–	Barbados	7	(0)
- * Club domestic league appearances and goals as of 13:36, 14 September 2020 (UTC) ‡ National team caps and goals as of 13:36, 14 September 2020 (UTC)

Louis Moss (born 23 October 1992) is a professional footballer who plays as a midfielder for Colwyn Bay. Born in England, he represents Barbados at international level.

== Club career ==
Moss began his career with Wrexham in the 2010–11 season, scoring in his debut against Luton Town.

He left Wrexham after the 2011–12 season. He next played for Ventura County Fusion in the United States' USL PDL.

He signed for Vauxhall Motors in August 2012 after trialing at Welsh Premier League club Aberystwyth Town.

He and his brother Ed signed for Colwyn Bay ahead of the 2013–14 season. He left the club in March 2014 to find regular first team football but rejoined again in June.

He later played for Chester Nomads and Runcorn Town. He then signed for Oswestry Town in January 2018, returning to the club in August 2018 following a spell in Australia with Peninsula Strikers.

== International career ==
He qualifies for Barbados through his mother, who was born on the Caribbean island.

He represented Barbados at under-15 and under-17 youth levels.

He made his international debut for Barbados in 2011, and he has appeared in three FIFA World Cup qualifying matches to date, as of December 2011. In September 2014, he was again called up by the national team after a three-year period without caps, when he was named in the squad for the second Caribbean qualifying round of the 2015 CONCACAF Gold Cup.
