= Shelley C.F.C. =

Association football club in England

Coordinates: 53.606192°N 1.723151°W

Shelley Community
- Full name: Shelley Community Football Club
- Founded: 1903
- Ground: Graham Leslie Arena, Storthes Hall
- Capacity: 1000
- Chairman: Chris Johnson
- Manager: Dom Webster
- League: Yorkshire Amateur League Supreme Division
- 2025–26: Yorkshire Amateur League Premier Division, 3rd of 14 (promoted)
Home colours

Shelley Community Football Club is a football club based in Shelley near Huddersfield, England but play in Kirkburton. They were most recently members of the 2024-25 Northern Counties East League having been moved from the North West Counties Football League in 2024, but resigned from the league in April 2025 and play at The Stafflex Arena at Storthes Hall Park. They are now members of Yorkshire Amateur League Supreme Division. The club is a FA Charter Standard Club affiliated to the Sheffield & Hallamshire County Football Association.

== History ==
The club was founded in 1903. The club started their first season in the Huddersfield and District League. The second season in the Huddersfield & District league, saw the club pick up their first silverware when they finished as champions of Division 2 Section A, however they lost the play off for promotion to Section B winners Meltham. The club would then have to wait over twenty years for anymore success in the league, when they won the Division Two title in 1928–29. Another long wait was required for more silverware, when 31 years later they clinched the Division Three title, something they would repeat again in the 1986–87 season. Before their last title win in the Huddersfield and District league the club had folded in 1972, only returning to life for the 1980–81 season.

Up until the end of 2010–11 season the club had stayed in the Huddersfield and District league, but the following season the club joined Division Two of the West Yorkshire League, going on to win the division at their first attempt and gaining promotion to Division one. The following season the club gained promotion to the Premier division when they finished as runners up. The club would then spend the next few seasons in the Premier division of the West Yorkshire league, until the end of the 2017–18 season, when they then joined Division one North of the North West Counties League. Their first season in the North West Counties league, saw the club also make their debut in the FA Vase, making it to the second qualifying round, before being knocked out by Cammell Laird 1907.

In 2020 Shelley resigned from the North West Counties League, with their reserve team, then in Division One of the West Yorkshire Association Football League becoming the new first team. They finished second in WYL Division One in 2021–22, earning promotion to the Premier Division. The following season they finished in 5th place but were elevated back to the North West Counties League, after one season back in the NWCL and after finishing second bottom Shelley were transferred laterally to Division 1 of the NCEL for the 2024–25 season. In April 2025, Shelley once again resigned from the NLS, the second time in 5 years the club has pulled out of semi professional football.

=== Season-by-season record ===
| Season | Division | Level | Position | FA Cup | FA Vase | Notes |
|---|---|---|---|---|---|---|
| 2009–10 | Huddersfield & District League Division Four | 17 | 1/11 | – | – | |
| 2010–11 | Huddersfield & District League Division Three | 16 | 1/12 | – | – | |
| 2011–12 | West Yorkshire Association League Division Two | 12 | 1/16 | – | – | Promoted |
| 2012–13 | West Yorkshire Association League Division One | 12 | 2/15 | – | – | Promoted |
| 2013–14 | West Yorkshire Association League Premier Division | 11 | 12/16 | – | – | |
| 2014–15 | West Yorkshire Association League Premier Division | 11 | 10/16 | – | – | |
| 2015–16 | West Yorkshire Association League Premier Division | 11 | 11/15 | – | – | |
| 2016–17 | West Yorkshire Association League Premier Division | 11 | 8/16 | – | – | |
| 2017–18 | West Yorkshire Association League Premier Division | 11 | 10/16 | – | – | Promoted |
| 2018–19 | North West Counties League Division One North | 10 | 12/20 | – | 2QR | |
| 2019–20 | North West Counties League Division One North | 10 | – | – | 1QR | Season abandoned |
| 2020–21 | North West Counties League Division One North | 10 | Withdrew | EPR | 2QR | Resigned |
| 2021–22 | West Yorkshire League Division One | 12 | 2/15 | – | – | Promoted |
| 2022–23 | West Yorkshire League Premier Division | 11 | 5/16 | – | – | Promoted |
| 2023–24 | North West Counties League Division One North | 10 | 17/18 | – | – | Transferred |
| 2024–25 | Northern Counties East League Division One | 10 | 17/22 | – | – | Resigned |
| 2025–26 | Yorkshire Amateur League Premier Division | 12 | 3/14 | – | – | Promoted |
| 2025–26 | Yorkshire Amateur League Supreme Division | 11 | | – | – | |
| Season | Division | Level | Position | FA Cup | FA Vase | Notes |
Source: Football Club History Database

== Ground ==
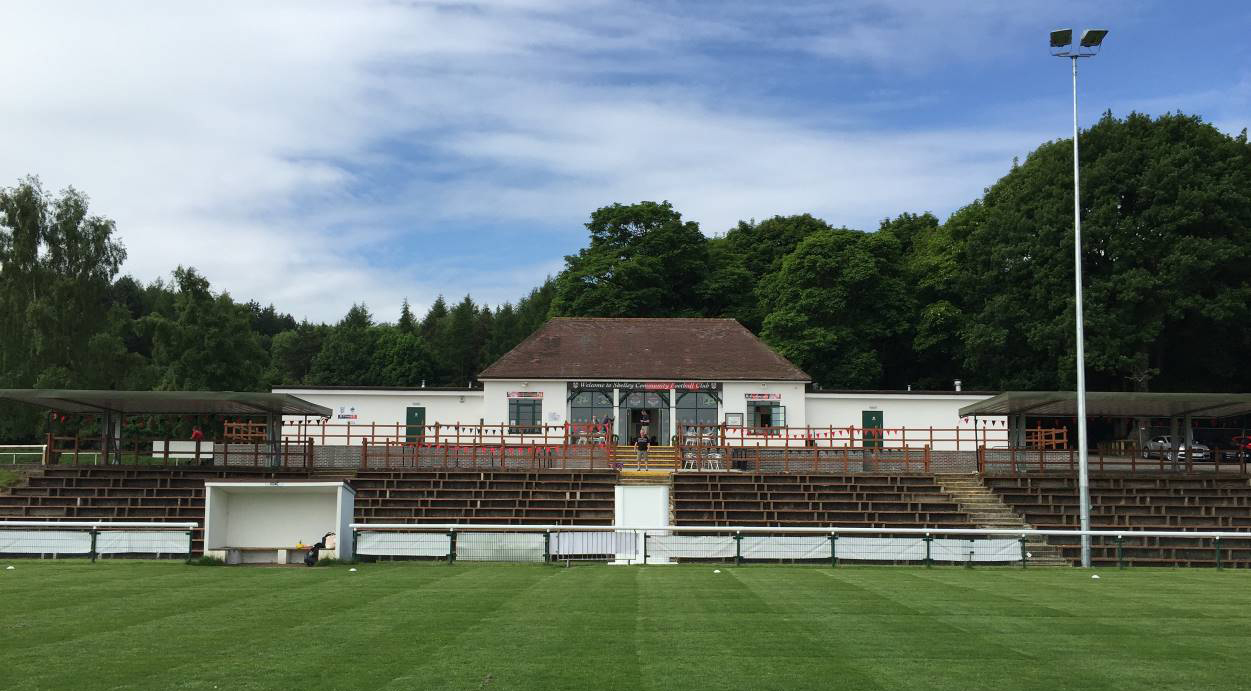
Stafflex Arena

Since 2011 the club has played its home games at Stafflex Arena, which is Shared with Huddersfield Town W.F.C. within the Storthes Hall Park which sits in the grounds of the old Storthes Hall Hospital. The club's original ground was Back Lane in Shelley, moving to Westerley Lane in the 1950s and then Skelmanthorpe Rec in 2000.

== Current squad ==
As of 15 November 2026

Note: Flags indicate national team as defined under FIFA eligibility rules; some limited exceptions apply. Players may hold more than one non-FIFA nationality.

| No. | Pos. | Nation | Player |
|---|---|---|---|
| -- | GK | ENG | Lewis Scott |
| -- | DF | ENG | Darius Mcleod |
| -- | DF | ENG | Daniel Vinten |
| -- | DF | ENG | Ethan Twigger |
| -- | DF | ENG | Freddie Larder |
| -- | DF | ENG | Louis Andre |
| -- | DF | ENG | Nathan Fletcher |
| -- | DF | ENG | Omayr Mirza |
| -- | DF | ENG | Tom Radley |
| -- | DF | ENG | Romell Simpson |
| -- | MF | GHA | Alpha Bah |
| -- | MF | ENG | Eoin Schofield |

| No. | Pos. | Nation | Player |
|---|---|---|---|
| -- | MF | ENG | James Bootland (captain) |
| -- | MF | ENG | Lee Bradshaw |
| -- | FW | ENG | Adam Mirza |
| -- | FW | ENG | Dante Newell |
| -- | FW | ENG | Darecce Siddique |
| -- | FW | ENG | Harvey Oddy |
| -- | FW | ENG | Isaac Travis |
| -- | FW | ENG | Iyrwah Gooden |
| -- | FW | ENG | Jenson Mcalisky |
| -- | FW | ENG | Josimar Bradshaw |
| -- | FW | ENG | Leon Morris |
| -- | FW | ENG | Reuben Noble-Lazarus |

=== Football Management ===
Head of Football Operations: Sam Taylor
Manager: Dom Webster
First Team Coach/Performance Analyst : Anthony Munday
Goalkeeping Coach/Kit Manager: Dan Jennings

== Honours ==
- West Yorkshire Association League
  - Division Two champions 2011–12
- Huddersfield and District League
  - Division Two champions 1928–29, 2000–01
  - Division Two Section A champions 1904–05
  - Division Three champions 1960–61, 1986–87, 2010–11
  - Division Four champions 2009–10
  - Groom Cup winners 1960–61, 2009–10, 2010–11
- Sheffield & Hallamshire FA
  - Sheffield & Hallamshire County FA Trophy 2025–26

== Records ==
- Best League performance: 12th in North West Counties Football League Division One North (level 10) 2018-19
- Best FA Cup performance: Extra Preliminary Round 2020-21
- Best FA Vase performance: 2nd Qualifying Round 2018-19 & 2020-21
