= 2019–20 Northern Premier League =

The 2019–20 season was the 52nd season of the Northern Premier League. After one season, the two divisions of Division One were re-aligned from West and East to North West and South East.

The League announced on 8 July 2019 that the new sponsors for 2019–20 were BetVictor.

As a result of the COVID-19 pandemic, this season's competition was formally abandoned on 26 March 2020, with all results from the season being expunged, and no promotion or relegation taking place to, from, or within the competition. On 30 March 2020, sixty-six non-league clubs sent an open letter to the Football Association requesting that they reconsider their decision. A legal appeal against the decision, funded by South Shields, was dismissed in June 2020.

== Premier Division ==
Northern Premier League Premier Division
- Season: 2019–20

=== Team changes ===
The following 5 clubs left the Premier Division before the season -

- Farsley Celtic – promoted to National League North
- Marine – relegated to NPL Division One North West
- North Ferriby United folded during the NPL Division One North West. A new North Ferriby was placed in Northern Counties East League Division One.
- Workington – relegated to NPL Division One North West
- Hednesford Town – transferred to Southern League Premier Division Central

Marine had been in the highest division of the league for 40 consecutive seasons before their relegation.

The following 5 clubs joined the Premier Division before the season -

- Ashton United – relegated from National League North
- Atherton Collieries – promoted from NPL Division One West
- F.C. United of Manchester – relegated from National League North
- Morpeth Town – promoted from NPL Division One East
- Radcliffe – promoted from NPL Division One West

=== Premier Division table at the time of abandonment ===
Pos	Team	Pld	W	D	L	GF	GA	GD	Pts	Qualification
1	South Shields	33	21	6	6	64	34	+30	69	
2	FC United of Manchester	32	16	9	7	73	51	+22	57	
3	Warrington Town	32	14	13	5	57	44	+13	55	
4	Basford United	32	16	7	9	49	39	+10	55	
5	Lancaster City	34	15	8	11	58	46	+12	53	
6	Nantwich Town	31	15	7	9	55	39	+16	52	
7	Whitby Town	31	14	8	9	54	42	+12	50	
8	Scarborough Athletic	35	14	8	13	44	47	−3	50	
9	Morpeth Town	27	14	6	7	48	37	+11	48	
10	Hyde United	33	12	7	14	55	55	0	43	
11	Gainsborough Trinity	32	11	9	12	53	50	+3	42	
12	Stalybridge Celtic	33	12	6	15	42	50	−8	42	
13	Bamber Bridge	33	12	4	17	53	64	−11	40	
14	Witton Albion	31	10	9	12	40	43	−3	39	
15	Mickleover Sports	29	11	5	13	42	52	−10	38	Changed Name to Mickleover
16	Radcliffe	32	11	5	16	34	50	−16	38	
17	Ashton United	29	10	7	12	40	45	−5	36 (Note: Ashton United were deducted one point for fielding an ineligible player)	
18	Buxton	32	8	11	13	56	52	+4	35	
19	Grantham Town	32	7	9	16	38	71	−33	30	
20	Matlock Town	28	8	5	15	36	43	−7	29	
21	Atherton Collieries	26	8	4	14	36	49	−13	28	
22	Stafford Rangers	33	4	11	18	29	53	−24	23	

Updated to match(es) played on 14 March 2020. Source: NPL official site
Rules for classification: 1) Points; 2) Goal difference; 3) Number of goals scored; 4) Number of matches won; 5) Head-to-head results

=== Top 10 goalscorers ===
Rank	Player	Club	Goals
1	(Belgium) Tunde Owolabi	F.C. United of Manchester	28
2	(Italy) Diego De Girolamo	Buxton	23
3	(England) James Walshaw	Scarborough Athletic	16
3	(England) Josh Wilson	Ashton United	16
5	(England) Jason Gilchrist	South Shields	15
5	(England) Darius Osei	South Shields & Stalybridge Celtic	15
7	(England) Alistair Waddecarr	Bamber Bridge	14
8	(England) David Norris	Lancaster City	13
9	(England) Liam Hardy	Buxton	12
9	(England) Gregg Smith	Gainsborough Trinity & Grantham Town	12
9	(England) Craig Westcarr	Grantham Town	12

Updated to matches played on 14 March 2020

=== Results table ===
Home \ Away	ASH	ATH	BAM	BAS	BUX	UOM	GAI	GRA	HYD	LNC	MAT	MIC	MOR	NAN	RAD	SCA	SOU	STA	STL	WAR	WHI	WIT
Ashton United		2–2				1–2	3–1			1–0	1–1	3–1		0–4	0–3	2–0	0–2	2–1	0–2	1–1	0–1	3–1
Atherton Collieries			4–1	1–3	1–1	2–3	1–3	2–0	2–1	2–1		1–3	1–5	3–1					3–0	2–4		
Bamber Bridge	3–2	3–0		1–3	2–1	3–0		2–1			1–2	3–2	3–0	2–2	2–1	1–2	1–2	2–0	2–3	3–3		1–1
Basford United	3–2	2–1	3–0		0–2	1–1	4–3	0–0	1–4	4–1	0–1		1–0	0–2	1–0	0–1		3–1	3–0		3–3	1–0
Buxton	1–2		1–1			2–2	3–3	7–0	1–2	1–1		0–1	2–3	1–2		5–0	1–2	5–1	0–0		3–4	2–0
FC United of Manchester			1–0	1–3	7–0		2–2	4–0	1–2	3–2	5–2	3–3	4–2		3–2	0–1	0–2	2–1		4–4		
Gainsborough Trinity		0–2	4–1	1–0	0–0					2–4	2–1	2–2	0–1	0–0	4–1	2–3	1–4		1–3	0–0	2–0	3–1
Grantham Town	0–4		1–0	1–0	1–3	3–2	1–5		2–2	0–3		1–1	1–2		4–0	2–1	1–3	2–0	2–0		0–4	
Hyde United	3–3		4–1	2–3	3–1	1–5	1–1	3–0		5–2	3–1	2–3	1–1	2–0		0–1		4–0	1–2		0–2	0–0
Lancaster City	3–0	1–0	2–3			0–0	0–1	3–3	2–2		1–0		4–1	0–0	1–0		1–2	2–1	0–0	2–1	1–3	1–1
Matlock Town		1–1	1–0	0–1	2–4		2–1	2–2	1–1			3–1	1–1		4–0	1–2	1–2		0–1	1–2	0–2	
Mickleover Sports	0–1				4–2	0–4		4–1		1–3			1–1	2–1	0–1	1–0		1–0	1–0		1–3	1–4
Morpeth Town	1–4	3–0		1–1	2–1				2–1	3–2				1–0	3–1		1–1	1–1		4–0		3–2
Nantwich Town			3–2		2–2	0–1	2–1	2–0	4–0	3–2	3–1				0–1	3–2	0–1	2–1		1–3		3–0
Radcliffe	1–1	1–0	0–4	3–0		1–1	0–2		3–0	0–3	1–0	1–0		2–2		3–1	0–1		1–0	1–1	2–2	1–0
Scarborough Athletic	3–1		5–0	1–1	1–1				1–0	0–1	2–1	4–1	1–0	1–1	3–1		0–0	1–1	1–1	1–1	2–1	0–0
South Shields	3–0	3–0	4–1	2–0	1–1	5–3	2–0	1–1	0–1	0–1		5–2		1–4	3–0	2–1			2–1	1–1		1–2
Stafford Rangers				0–0	0–0	0–0	2–2	1–1	1–3	0–3	0–1	0–1	0–2		2–0	1–0	1–2		1–1	2–2	2–1	1–1
Stalybridge Celtic	0–0	1–2	3–2	2–3	2–0	2–3	1–2	3–2				1–3		0–2	1–3	5–1	2–2	0–3		0–2	2–1	
Warrington Town		1–1	3–1	1–1		0–1		3–3	4–1	2–2	3–2	1–0	1–3	3–1	1–0	2–0		2–1	1–2		2–1	1–1
Whitby Town	1–1	3–1	0–1			1–2	2–2	1–1	2–0		0–3	1–1	2–1	3–3		2–0	2–1	2–1		0–1		1–1
Witton Albion	1–0	2–1			0–2	3–3	1–0	3–1	2–0	1–3		1–0		1–2		3–1	3–1	2–2	0–1		2–3	

Updated to match(es) played on 1 January 2020. Source: NPL Premier Division results grid. Missing results up to suspension of season (and Radcliffe home corrections) added from The FA Non-League Club Directory 2020/21 pp 265 & 284.
Legend: Blue = home team win; Yellow = draw; Red = away team win.

update=14 September 2019

=== Promotion play-offs ===
Semifinals
2
5
3
4

Final

Semi-finals

–

–

Final

–

=== Stadia and locations ===
Locations of the 2019–20 Premier Division clubs
Locations of Northern Premier League 2019–20 Division One North West teams (Greater Manchester)

Club	Location	Ground	Capacity
Ashton United	Ashton-under-Lyne	Hurst Cross	4,500
Atherton Collieries	Atherton	Alder Street	2,500
Bamber Bridge	Bamber Bridge	Irongate	2,264
Basford United	Nottingham (Basford)	Greenwich Avenue	2,200
Buxton	Buxton	The Silverlands	5,200
FC United of Manchester	Manchester (Moston)	Broadhurst Park	4,400
Gainsborough Trinity	Gainsborough	The Northolme	4,304
Grantham Town	Grantham	South Kesteven Sports Stadium	7,500
Hyde United	Hyde	Ewen Fields	4,250
Lancaster City	Lancaster	Giant Axe	3,500
Matlock Town	Matlock	Causeway Lane	2,214
Mickleover Sports	Derby (Mickleover)	Station Road	1,500
Morpeth Town	Morpeth	Craik Park	1,500
Nantwich Town	Nantwich	The Weaver Stadium	3,500
Radcliffe	Radcliffe	Stainton Park	3,500
Scarborough Athletic	Scarborough	Flamingo Land Stadium	2,833
South Shields	South Shields	Mariners Park	3,500
Stafford Rangers	Stafford	Marston Road	4,000
Stalybridge Celtic	Stalybridge	Bower Fold	6,500
Warrington Town	Warrington	Cantilever Park	3,500
Whitby Town	Whitby	Turnbull Ground	3,500
Witton Albion	Northwich	Wincham Park	4,813

== Division One North West ==
Northern Premier League Division One North West
- Season: 2019–20

=== Team changes ===
The following 10 clubs left Division One West before the season -

- Atherton Collieries – promoted to NPL Premier Division
- Chasetown – transferred to NPL Division One South East
- Colwyn Bay resigned from the English Pyramid to join FAW Cymru North in the Welsh Pyramid
- Glossop North End – transferred to NPL Division One South East
- Kidsgrove Athletic – transferred to NPL Division One South East
- Leek Town – transferred to NPL Division One South East
- Market Drayton Town – transferred to NPL Division One South East
- Newcastle Town – transferred to NPL Division One South East
- Radcliffe – promoted to NPL Premier Division
- Skelmersdale United – relegated to North West Counties League Premier Division

The following 10 clubs joined Division One North West before the season -

- Brighouse Town – transferred from NPL Division One East
- City of Liverpool – promoted from North West Counties League Premier Division
- Dunston – promoted from Northern League Division One
- Marine – relegated from NPL Premier Division
- Marske United – transferred from NPL Division One East
- Ossett United – transferred from NPL Division One East
- Pickering Town – transferred from NPL Division One East
- Pontefract Collieries – transferred from NPL Division One East
- Tadcaster Albion – transferred from NPL Division One East
- Workington – relegated from NPL Premier Division

=== Division One North-West table at the time of abandonment ===
Pos	Team	Pld	W	D	L	GF	GA	GD	Pts	Relegation
1	Workington	31	22	5	4	77	25	+52	71	
2	Ramsbottom United	28	19	4	5	71	36	+35	61	
3	Marine	30	17	7	6	66	34	+32	58	
4	Pontefract Collieries	25	16	4	5	47	24	+23	52	
5	Marske United	26	15	6	5	50	25	+25	51	
6	Clitheroe	30	12	8	10	46	39	+7	44	
7	Mossley	30	12	6	12	37	49	−12	41 (Note: Mossley were deducted one point for fielding an ineligible player)	
8	Tadcaster Albion	27	11	7	9	40	30	+10	40	
9	Trafford	29	10	8	11	46	39	+7	38	
10	Runcorn Linnets	27	10	8	9	41	40	+1	38	
11	Brighouse Town	29	13	3	13	38	41	−3	38 (Note: Brighouse Town were deducted four points for fielding ineligible player(s) on two occasions)	
12	Widnes	31	9	10	12	47	49	−2	37	
13	Dunston	28	9	8	11	41	45	−4	35	
14	Prescot Cables	30	8	9	13	32	41	−9	33	
15	Colne	25	7	9	9	31	31	0	30	
16	Droylsden	30	7	6	17	28	75	−47	27 (Note: Droylsden Resigned from NPL Division One North West before the start of the next season.)	Resigned from NPL before the start of the next season
17	City of Liverpool	27	9	5	13	32	45	−13	26 (Note: City of Liverpool were deducted six points for fielding an ineligible player on more than one occasion)	
18	Ossett United	28	5	7	16	38	57	−19	22	
19	Kendal Town	29	5	6	18	29	72	−43	21	
20	Pickering Town	30	4	4	22	37	77	−40	16	

Updated to match(es) played on 14 March 2020. Source: NPL official site
Rules for classification: 1) Points; 2) Goal difference; 3) Number of goals scored; 4) Number of matches won; 5) Head-to-head results

=== Top 10 goalscorers ===
Rank	Player	Club	Goals
1	(England) Scott Allison	Workington	22
2	(England) Niall Cummins	Marine	19
3	(England) Nic Evangelinos	Ramsbottom United	18
4	(England) Tom Greaves	Ossett United	16
5	(England) Connor Gaul	Clitheroe	15
5	(England) Curtis Round	Marske United	15
7	(England) Jamie Rainford	Widnes, Mossley & Runcorn Linnets	14
8	(England) Lewis Salmon	Trafford	12
9	(England) Jacob Day	Tadcaster Albion	11
9	(England) Joe Lumsden	Pontefract Collieries	11

Updated to matches played on 14 March 2019

=== Results table ===
Home \ Away	BRI	CLI	CLN	COL	DRO	DUN	KEN	MAR	MRS	MOS	OSS	PIC	PON	PRE	RAM	RUN	TAD	TRA	WID	WOR
Brighouse Town		2–1			0–1				0–1											
Clitheroe							4–1													2–0
Colne	0–0			0–2										1–2		4–4				
City of Liverpool								1–3			4–0								2–3	
Droylsden				3–3			2–2			2–1			1–4	1–1						
Dunston											1–0					3–3				
Kendal Town			1–2									3–1		0–1						
Marine		1–1	3–3	4–0		1–1	4–1		3–1	6–0	3–0	2–1	1–1	2–1				1–2		2–2
Marske United		1–0				2–1														
Mossley							5–0									2–1				2–0
Ossett United	1–2									0–0		1–0			1–1				4–2	
Pickering Town										3–2					1–2					
Pontefract Collieries															2–0		1–0			
Prescot Cables			2–2			1–0											1–1			
Ramsbottom United			2–0															1–0	3–2	
Runcorn Linnets		4–2			0–1							1–1								1–1
Tadcaster Albion								2–1				5–0						2–1		
Trafford			0–2						1–1										0–2	0–1
Widnes	0–1		1–2		3–1	3–0	4–0	1–4		0–0	2–2	3–2		3–1	2–2	1–2		0–0		
Workington				1–1			5–0	0–0				4–1	2–1	4–0	5–1		2–0		2–0	

Updated to match(es) played on 14 September 2019 (Marine FC 11 January 2020). Source: NPL First Division East results grid
Legend: Blue = home team win; Yellow = draw; Red = away team win.

|update=14 September 2019

=== Promotion play-offs ===
Semifinals
2
5
3
4

Final

Semi-finals

–

–

Final

–

=== Relegation play-off ===
Play-off
20
Step 4

–

=== Stadia and locations ===
Locations of Northern Premier League 2019–20 Division One North West teams

Team	Location	Stadium	Capacity
Brighouse Town	Brighouse	St Giles Road	1,000
City of Liverpool	Aintree	New Bucks Park	3,750
Clitheroe	Clitheroe	Shawbridge	2,000
Colne	Colne	Holt House	1,800
Droylsden	Droylsden	Butcher's Arms Ground	3,000
Dunston	Dunston	Wellington Road	2,500
Kendal Town	Kendal	Parkside Road	2,400
Marine	Crosby	Marine Travel Arena	3,185
Marske United	Marske-by-the-Sea	Mount Pleasant	2,500
Mossley	Mossley	Seel Park	4,000
Ossett United	Ossett	Ingfield	1,950
Pickering Town	Pickering	Mill Lane	2,000
Pontefract Collieries	Pontefract	Harratt Nissan Stadium	1,200
Prescot Cables	Prescot	Valerie Park	3,200
Ramsbottom United	Ramsbottom	The Harry Williams Riverside	2,000
Runcorn Linnets	Runcorn	Millbank Linnets Stadium	1,600
Tadcaster Albion	Tadcaster	Ings Lane	2,000
Trafford	Urmston	Shawe View	2,500
Widnes	Widnes	Select Security Stadium	13,350
Workington	Workington	Borough Park	3,101

== Division One South East ==
Northern Premier League Division One South East
- Season: 2019–20

=== Team changes ===
The following 9 clubs left Division One East before the season -

- AFC Mansfield – demoted to Northern Counties East League Premier Division after their ground failed grading regulations
- Brighouse Town – transferred to NPL Division One North West
- Gresley – relegated to Midland League Premier Division
- Marske United – transferred to NPL Division One North West
- Morpeth Town – promoted to NPL Premier Division as Champions
- Ossett United – transferred to NPL Division One North West
- Pickering Town – transferred to NPL Division One North West
- Pontefract Collieries – transferred to NPL Division One North West
- Tadcaster Albion – transferred to NPL Division One North West

The following 9 clubs joined Division One South East before the season -

- Chasetown – transferred from NPL Division One West
- Glossop North End – transferred from NPL Division One West
- Ilkeston Town – promoted from Midland League Premier Division
- Kidsgrove Athletic – transferred from NPL Division One West
- Leek Town – transferred from NPL Division One West
- Market Drayton Town – transferred from NPL Division One West
- Newcastle Town – transferred from NPL Division One West
- Sutton Coldfield Town – transferred from Southern League Division One Central
- Worksop Town – promoted from Northern Counties East League Premier Division

=== Division One South-East table at the time of abandonment ===
Pos	Team	Pld	W	D	L	GF	GA	GD	Pts
1	Leek Town	28	23	3	2	64	19	+45	72
2	Stamford	29	22	4	3	74	27	+47	70
3	Cleethorpes Town	29	17	6	6	67	40	+27	57
4	Belper Town	26	14	7	5	44	29	+15	49
5	Carlton Town	26	14	6	6	52	33	+19	48
6	Stocksbridge Park Steels	30	13	8	9	49	45	+4	47
7	Sutton Coldfield Town	28	13	5	10	45	34	+11	44
8	Frickley Athletic	31	14	4	13	49	44	+5	43 (Note: Frickley Athletic were penalised three points for fielding an ineligible player)
9	Ilkeston Town	32	12	7	13	52	50	+2	43
10	Kidsgrove Athletic	27	11	6	10	42	31	+11	39
11	Loughborough Dynamo	29	11	6	12	43	45	−2	39
12	Worksop Town	32	12	2	18	41	55	−14	38
13	Sheffield	27	10	7	10	49	47	+2	37
14	Glossop North End	30	8	9	13	36	45	−9	33
15	Chasetown	30	9	5	16	38	52	−14	32
16	Spalding United	30	8	8	14	33	53	−20	32
17	Newcastle Town	30	8	4	18	42	55	−13	28
18	Lincoln United	29	8	3	18	30	60	−30	27
19	Market Drayton Town	30	6	2	22	34	85	−51	20
20	Wisbech Town	29	4	6	19	29	64	−35	18

Updated to match(es) played on 14 March 2020. Source: NPL official site
Rules for classification: 1) Points; 2) Goal difference; 3) Number of goals scored; 4) Number of matches won; 5) Head-to-head results

=== Top 10 goalscorers ===
Rank	Player	Club	Goals
1	(England) Tim Grice	Leek Town	24
2	(England) Scott Vernon	Cleethorpes Town	23
3	(England) Jonathon Margetts	Frickley Athletic	19
4	(England) Tyler Blake	Carlton Town	18
4	(England) Tom Siddons	Stamford	18
6	(England) Luke Mangham	Stocksbridge Park Steels	16
7	(England) Jacob Hazel	Frickley Athletic	14
8	(England) Scott Ruthven	Stocksbridge Park Steels	13
9	(England) Ryan McLean	Newcastle Town & Market Drayton Town	12
9	(England) Isai Marselia	Sutton Coldfield Town	12
9	(England) Marc Newsham	Sheffield	12

Updated to matches played on 14 March 2020

=== Results table ===
Home \ Away	BEL	CAR	CHA	CLE	FRI	GNE	ILK	KID	LEE	LIN	LOU	MAR	NEW	SHE	SPA	STA	STO	SUT	WIS	WOR
Belper Town					3–1	2–0														
Carlton Town					3–2								3–1					1–0		1–3
Chasetown							0–2					2–1			2–2					
Cleethorpes Town									2–1	5–0	5–4									
Frickley Athletic			0–3				1–3												1–1	1–2
Glossop North End											1–1					0–1	2–2			
Ilkeston Town	0–0			0–0								3–0			0–0					2–1
Kidsgrove Athletic		0–1				0–0											0–4			
Leek Town							2–1	2–1										2–0		
Lincoln Town		0–2													1–0	1–3		1–2		
Loughborough Dynamo			3–1											1–4						3–2
Market Drayton Town	3–4							0–2	1–2	2–3			2–5							
Newcastle Town			2–4			0–2													2–2	
Sheffield				3–1	6–0				2–3				2–1							
Spalding United				2–1							2–0	0–1								
Stamford		0–3					4–2							1–3						
Stocksbridge Park Steels										2–1				3–2	1–3	1–1				
Sutton Coldfield Town				1–3											0–2					
Wisbech Town									0–2	4–1						0–2				
Worksop Town	1–2							0–1											4–0	

Updated to match(es) played on 14 September 2019. Source: NPL South East Division results grid
Legend: Blue = home team win; Yellow = draw; Red = away team win.

|update=14 September 2019

=== Promotion play-offs ===
Semifinals
2
5
3
4

Final

Semi-finals

–

–

Final

–

=== Relegation play-off ===
Play-off
20
Step 4

–

=== Stadia and locations ===
Locations of Northern Premier League 2019–20 Division One South East teams

Team	Location	Stadium	Capacity
Belper Town	Belper	Christchurch Meadow	2,650
Carlton Town	Carlton	Bill Stokeld Stadium	1,500
Chasetown	Burntwood	The Scholars Ground	2,000
Cleethorpes Town	Grimsby	Bradley Football Centre	1,000
Frickley Athletic	South Elmsall	Westfield Lane	2,087
Glossop North End	Glossop	The Amdec Forklift Stadium	1,350
Ilkeston Town	Ilkeston	New Manor Ground	3,029
Kidsgrove Athletic	Kidsgrove	The Autonet Insurance Stadium	2,000
Leek Town	Leek	Harrison Park	3,600
Lincoln United	Lincoln	Ashby Avenue	2,200
Loughborough Dynamo	Loughborough	Nanpantan Sports Ground	1,500
Market Drayton Town	Market Drayton	Greenfields Sports Ground	1,000
Newcastle Town	Newcastle-under-Lyme	Lyme Valley Stadium	4,000
Sheffield	Dronfield	Coach and Horses Ground	2,089
Spalding United	Spalding	Sir Halley Stewart Field	3,500
Stamford	Stamford	Borderville Sports Centre	2,000
Stocksbridge Park Steels	Stocksbridge	Bracken Moor	3,500
Sutton Coldfield Town	Sutton Coldfield	Central Ground	2,000
Wisbech Town	Wisbech	Fenland Stadium	1,118
Worksop Town	Worksop	Sandy Lane	2,500

== Challenge Cup ==
2019–20 Integro League Cup
Tournament details
- Country: England
- Teams: 62

The 2019–20 Northern Premier League Challenge Cup, known as the 2019–20 Integro Doodson League Cup for sponsorship reasons, is the 50th season of the Northern Premier League Challenge Cup, the main cup competition in the Northern Premier League. It was sponsored by Doodson Sport for an eighth consecutive season. 62 clubs entered the competition, beginning with the First Round, and all ties ended after 90 minutes and if the scores were level concluded with penalties.

The format from last season remains with two clubs to receive a bye into Round 2.

The defending champions are Trafford

The Competition alongside the League contest was abandoned with no title awarded due to the Coronavirus Pandemic

=== First round ===
Several First Round Ties were postponed from their original dates to allow teams to prepare for the FA Cup 2nd Qualifying Round on the following weekend

Tie	Home team (tier)	Score	Away team (tier)	Att.
Monday 16 September 2019
1	Basford United (7)	3–0	Carlton Town (8)	191
2	Brighouse Town (8)	P–P	Stocksbridge Park Steels (8)	
3	Kidsgrove Athletic (8)	P–P	Warrington Town (7)	
5	Atherton Collieries (7)	0–0 (4–3 p)	Prescot Cables (8)	192
Tuesday 17 September 2019
4	Ashton United (7)	P–P	Stalybridge Celtic (7)	
5	Atherton Collieries(7)	P–P	Prescot Cables (8)	
6	Belper Town (8)	P–P	Matlock Town (8)	
7	Buxton (7)	P–P	Ilkeston Town (8)	
8	City of Liverpool (8)	0–1	Mossley (8)	186
9	Cleethorpes Town (8)	1–4	Grantham Town (7)	119
10	Dunston (8)	P–P	Scarborough Athletic (7)	
11	FC United of Manchester (7)	P–P	Glossop North End (8)	
12	Frickley Athletic (8)	P–P	Sheffield (8)	
13	Lancaster City (7)	P–P	Colne (8)	
14	Leek Town (8)	P–P	Runcorn Linnets (8)	
15	Marine (8)	P–P	Clitheroe (8)	
16	Market Drayton Town (8)	P–P	Sutton Coldfield Town (8)	
17	Mickleover Sports (7)	P–P	Loughborough Dynamo (8)	
18	Morpeth Town (7)	P–P	Marske United (8)	
19	Nantwich Town (7)	P–P	Widnes (8)	
20	Newcastle Town (8)	P–P	Witton Albion (7)	
21	Pickering Town (8)	P–P	Whitby Town (7)	
22	Pontefract Collieries (8)	P–P	Ossett United (8)	
23	Radcliffe (7)	4–0	Droylsden (8)	129
24	Ramsbottom United (8)	P–P	Bamber Bridge (7)	
25	Stafford Rangers (7)	P–P	Chasetown (8)	
26	Spalding United (8)	0–0 (5–6 p)	Gainsborough Trinity (7)	103
27	Stamford (8)	P–P	Lincoln United (8)	
28	Tadcaster Albion (8)	0–4	South Shields (7)	212
29	Workington (8)	6–1	Kendal Town (8)	210
Wednesday 18 September 2019
30	Worksop Town (8)	4–1	Wisbech Town (8)	210
Tuesday 8 October 2019
12	Frickley Athletic (8)	1–1 (3–4 p)	Sheffield (8)	121
Tuesday 15 October 2019
2	Brighouse Town (8)	P–P	Stocksbridge Park Steels (8)	
Monday 21 October 2019
2	Brighouse Town (8)	3–0	Stocksbridge Park Steels (8)	75
Monday 11 November 2019
3	Kidsgrove Athletic (8)	2–2 (4–2 p)	Warrington Town (7)	99

Tie	Home team (tier)	Score	Away team (tier)	Att.
Tuesday 12 November 2019
4	Ashton United (7)	1–2	Stalybridge Celtic (7)	182
6	Belper Town (8)	P–P	Matlock Town (8)	
7	Buxton (7)	3–0	Ilkeston Town (8)	91
10	Dunston (8)	P–P	Scarborough Athletic (7)	
14	Leek Town (8)	P–P	Runcorn Linnets (8)	
15	Marine (8)	1–1 (3–2 p)	Clitheroe (8)	173
16	Market Drayton Town (8)	P–P	Sutton Coldfield Town (8)	
17	Mickleover Sports (7)	P–P	Loughborough Dynamo (8)	
18	Morpeth Town (7)	P–P	Marske United (8)	
20	Newcastle Town (8)	1–0	Witton Albion (7)	58
21	Pickering Town (8)	P–P	Whitby Town (7)	
22	Pontefract Collieries (8)	P–P	Ossett United (8)	
24	Ramsbottom United (8)	P–P	Bamber Bridge (7)	
25	Stafford Rangers (7)	0–2	Chasetown (8)	220
27	Stamford (8)	0–0 (4–5 p)	Lincoln United (8)	114
Tuesday 19 November 2019
6	Belper Town (8)	P–P	Matlock Town (8)	
10	Dunston (8)	5–1	Scarborough Athletic (7)	354
Match at Scarborough Athletic.
11	FC United of Manchester (7)	2–2 (6–5 p)	Glossop North End (8)	372
13	Lancaster City (7)	2–1	Colne (8)	120
17	Mickleover Sports (7)	3–2	Loughborough Dynamo (8)	84
19	Nantwich Town (7)	5–6	Widnes (8)	116
24	Ramsbottom United (8)	P–P	Bamber Bridge (7)	
Tuesday 26 November 2019
6	Belper Town (8)	2–2 (5–6 p)	Matlock Town (8)	275
18	Morpeth Town (7)	P–P	Marske United (8)	
21	Pickering Town (8)	2–1	Whitby Town (7)	109
Tuesday 3 December 2019
14	Leek Town (8)	0–1	Runcorn Linnets (8)	151
Match at Runcorn Linnets.
16	Market Drayton Town (8)	2–0	Sutton Coldfield Town (8)	66
18	Morpeth Town (7)	A–A	Marske United (8)	
Match abandoned after 36 minutes due to a floodlight failure when the score was 0–0.
22	Pontefract Collieries (8)	0–2	Ossett United (8)	133
Tuesday 17 December 2019
18	Morpeth Town (7)	P–P	Marske United (8)	
24	Ramsbottom United (8)	P–P	Bamber Bridge (7)	
Tuesday 7 January 2020
18	Morpeth Town (7)	5–2	Marske United (8)	175
24	Ramsbottom United (8)	2–1	Bamber Bridge (7)	139

=== Second round ===
Tie	Home team (tier)	Score	Away team (tier)	Att.
Monday 9 December 2019
2	Basford United (7)	P–P	Matlock Town (8)	
8	Kidsgrove Athletic (8)	2–1	Market Drayton Town (8)	65
Tuesday 10 December 2019
1	Atherton Collieries (7)	P–P	Stalybridge Celtic (7)	
3	Dunston (8)	P–P	South Shields (7)	
4	FC United of Manchester (7)	P–P	Sheffield (8)	
5	Gainsborough Trinity (7)	P–P	Lincoln United (8)	
6	Grantham Town(7)	0–0 (0–3 p)	Worksop Town (8)	93
7	Hyde United (7)	0–0 (4–3 p)	Lancaster City (7)	57
9	Leek Town (8)	P–P	Widnes (8)	
10	Marine (8)	P–P	Radcliffe (7)	
11	Mickleover Sports (7)	P–P	Buxton (7)	
12	Morpeth Town (7)	P–P	Pickering Town (8)	
14	Ossett United (8)	P–P	Brighouse Town (8)	
16	Workington (8)	P–P	Mossley (8)	
Tuesday 17 December 2019
10	Marine (8)	3–0	Radcliffe (7)	128
13	Newcastle Town (8)	P–P	Chasetown (8)	
16	Workington (8)	2–0	Mossley (8)	180
Tuesday 7 January 2020
5	Gainsborough Trinity (7)	1–1 (0–3 p)	Lincoln United (8)	147

Tie	Home team (tier)	Score	Away team (tier)	Att.
9	Leek Town (8)	2–2 (4–5 p)	Widnes (8)	123
11	Mickleover Sports (7)	2–3	Buxton (7)	108
14	Ossett United (8)	3–0	Brighouse Town (8)	199
Wednesday 8 January 2020
13	Newcastle Town (8)	2–1	Chasetown (8)	85
Tuesday 14 January 2020
1	Atherton Collieries (7)	P–P	Stalybridge Celtic (7)	
2	Basford United (7)	0–5	Matlock Town (8)	165
3	Dunston (8)	P–P	South Shields (7)	
12	Morpeth Town (7)	P–P	Pickering Town (8)	
15	Trafford (8)	5–2	Ramsbottom United (8)	129
Tuesday 21 January 2020
4	FC United of Manchester (7)	1–2	Sheffield (8)	482
Tuesday 28 January 2020
1	Atherton Collieries (7)	P–P	Stalybridge Celtic (7)	
3	Dunston (8)	1–1 (5–6 p)	South Shields (7)	345
12	Morpeth Town (7)	3–1	Pickering Town (8)	220
Tuesday 11 February 2020
1	Atherton Collieries (7)	P–P	Stalybridge Celtic (7)	
Tuesday 3 March 2020
1	Atherton Collieries (7)	4–1	Stalybridge Celtic (7)	106
Match at Stalybridge Celtic.

=== Third round ===
Tie	Home team (tier)	Score	Away team (tier)	Att.
Tuesday 11 February 2020
1	Atherton Collieries (7)	P–P	Marine (8)	
2	South Shields (7)	P–P	Morpeth Town (7)	
3	Sheffield (8)	P–P	Trafford (8)	
4	Gainsborough Trinity (7)	P–P	Kidsgrove Athletic (8)	
Gainsborough Trinity were re-instated after Lincoln United were found guilty of playing an ineligible player.
5	Newcastle Town (8)	3–1	Buxton (7)	75
7	Workington (8)	P–P	Ossett United (8)	
Wednesday 12 February 2020
2	South Shields (7)	2–5	Morpeth Town (7)	479

Tie	Home team (tier)	Score	Away team (tier)	Att.
6	Widnes (8)	1–2	Hyde United (7)	125
8	Worksop Town (8)	1–2	Matlock Town (8)	251
Tuesday 18 February 2020
1	Atherton Collieries (7)	P–P	Marine (8)	
4	Gainsborough Trinity (7)	1–1 (9–10 p)	Kidsgrove Athletic (8)	135
Tuesday 3 March 2020
3	Sheffield (8)	3–3 (4–3 p)	Trafford (8)	82
7	Workington (8)	2–0	Ossett United (8)	163
Thursday 19 March 2020
1	Atherton Collieries (7)	–	Marine (8)	

=== Quarter-finals ===
Tie	Home team (tier)	Score	Away team (tier)	Att.
Wednesday 4 March 2020
3	Kidsgrove Athletic (8)	1–2	Hyde United (7)	133
4	Newcastle Town (8)	–	Matlock Town (8)	
2	Workington (8)	–	Sheffield (8)	
1	Atherton Collieries (7) or Marine (8)	–	Morpeth Town (7)	

== See also ==
- Northern Premier League
- 2019–20 Isthmian League
- 2019–20 Southern League
