= Stone Old Alleynians F.C. =

Association football club in England

Coordinates: 52.8913°N 2.1931°W

Stone Old Alleynians
- Full name: Stone Old Alleynians Football Club
- Nickname: The Old Boys
- Founded: 1962
- Ground: Alleynes Sports Centre, Oulton Road, Stone
- Capacity: 2,000
- Chairman: Richard Jones
- Manager: Luke Askey
- League: Midland League Premier Division
- 2025–26: Midland League Premier Division, 12th of 18
Home colours

Stone Old Alleynians Football Club is a community football club based in the town of Stone, Staffordshire, England. The club plays in the Midland League Premier Division. The club is affiliated to the Staffordshire Football Association.

The Club is traditionally based at Alleyne’s Sports Centre, Oulton Road, Stone, located just 200 yards away from Alleyne’s Academy.

Stone Old Alleynians FC holds full, 3-Star FA Accreditation and hosts over 70 teams, ranging from U6s to over-70s. It also has a female section, including 18 teams of whom two are open-age women’s teams competing in the Staffordshire Ladies County League, a veterans section containing over 200 members and a wide range of disability provision too.

In 2026, the Club’s social impact value to the community was valued at £2.6m per annum.

In 2025-26, the Club were officially announced as ‘Club of the Year’ by Staffordshire FA, whilst also featuring in a four-part documentary, Knot Just Football, focusing on community football clubs.

== History ==
The club's name derives from its foundation in 1962 with a team of former pupils, with some teachers and current pupils, of Alleyne's Grammar School, Stone, Staffordshire (now Alleyne's Academy). The club started in Division 4 of the Stafford Amateur League, gaining promotion to Division 3 in their second season. The following season saw them promoted again and further promotion followed as they finished as champions of Division 2. The 1970–71 season saw the club win the league for the first time, and then winning it again a further 3 times.

The club joined the North Staffs Alliance League for the start of the 1980–81 season. When the league was split into two, the club was essentially relegated to Division one, they came back to the Premier division as runners-up at the end of the 1987–88 season. In 1992, the team moved to the Staffordshire County League. The 2007–08 season saw the club move to Division 2 of the West Midlands (Regional) League. After finishing 4th in the 2009–10 season, the club won promotion to division one.

The 2014–15 season saw the club enter the F.A. Vase for the first time and finish runners up in Division one earning promotion to the Premier division of the West Midlands (Regional) League. After the FA reorganised the English football league system, the club found they had been moved to Division one of the North West Counties League for the start of the 2018–19 season. The 2019–20 season saw the club make their debut in the FA Cup.

In 2021, they were promoted to the Premier Division of the Midland League based on their results in the abandoned 2019–20 and 2020–21 seasons.

== Ground ==
The club play their first team home games at Newcastle Town FC in Newcastle under-Lyme after moving there for the 2024-25 season.

The rest of the Club’s teams play at Alleyne’s Sports Centre, Stone.

Historically, the Club have played at the following grounds:

1962-1999 Alleyne’s School Field/Sports Centre 1999-2002 Outlanes Sports Ground 2002-2021 Yarnfield Park 2021-2024 King’s Park, Meir Heath 2024 Lyme Valley Stadium, Newcastle-under-Lyme

== Records ==
- Best FA Cup performance: Second qualifying round, 2021–22
- Best FA Vase performance: Second round, 2020–21, 2022–23, 2023–24

== Honours ==
Staffordshire FA ‘Club of the Year’ 2026

Staffordshire Senior Cup

- Runners-up 2021-22 v Stafford Rangers

JW Hunt Cup

- Runners-up 2015–16 v Tividale

Mid-Staffordshire League

- Div 1: Champions 1971–72; 1974–75; 1978–79
- Div 2: Champions 1965–66; 1980–81
- Div 2 Cup: Winners 1983–84
- Div 3: Runners-up 1978–79
- Div 4: Runners-up 1963–64

Borough Cup:

- Winners: 1978–79
- Runners-up: 1972–73; 1975–76

Pageant Cup:

- Winners: 1974–75; 1975–76;
- Runners-up: 1972–74; 1978–79; 1983–84

Staffordshire Presidents Cup (Southern Area):

- Runners-up: 1963–64

Staffs Alliance League:

- League Cup: Runners-up 1981–82

Bourne Sports Trophy:

- Runners-up: 2004–05

Stone Charity Cup:

- Winners: 1968–69; 1971–74; 1974–75
- Runners-up: 1972–73

Uttoxeter Charity Cup:

- Runners-up: 1981–82; 1983–84
