= New Mills F.C. =

English football club

Coordinates: 53°21′59.03″N 1°59′35.19″W

- Full name: New Mills Football Club
- Nickname: The Millers
- Founded: 1919 (reformed 1983)
- Ground: Church Lane, New Mills
- Capacity: 1,400 (200 seated)
- Chairman: Ray Coverley
- Manager: Nathan Neequaye and Sam Scott
- League: North West Counties League Division One South
- 2025–26: North West Counties League Division One South, 3rd of 18
- Website: newmillsfc.com
Home colours	Away colours

New Mills Football Club ('The Millers') are an English football club based in New Mills, Derbyshire. They currently play in the North West Counties League Division One South.

== History ==
Formed in 1886 New Mills quickly progressed through the local leagues in its early days and even had a spell in the Manchester League. However, the club disbanded in 1898 and a new team was formed in 1903, New Mills St George's, which in a period up to World War I, won a number of titles, including the Derbyshire Minor Cup.

In 1914, at the start of World War I, New Mills St George's folded, and it was not until the end of the war that a new club was formed. The new New Mills joined the Manchester League in its first season after re-opening in 1920. They finished top in 1924 and, after finishing as runner-up the following season, lifted the championship once again in 1926.

As well as winning the league, New Mills also won the Derbyshire Cup three seasons out of four. The club was extremely well supported and had regular gates of around 3000. This was a very successful few seasons for the club, and at least half a dozen players moved on to clubs in the Football League.

The club was once again disbanded due to World War II but reformed again afterwards, this time entering the Manchester Amateur League before progressing once again to the Manchester League, taking the title in 1956.

In 1959, Joe Martin took charge as manager, which started a run of success for the club, winning the league seven times before he retired in 1972.

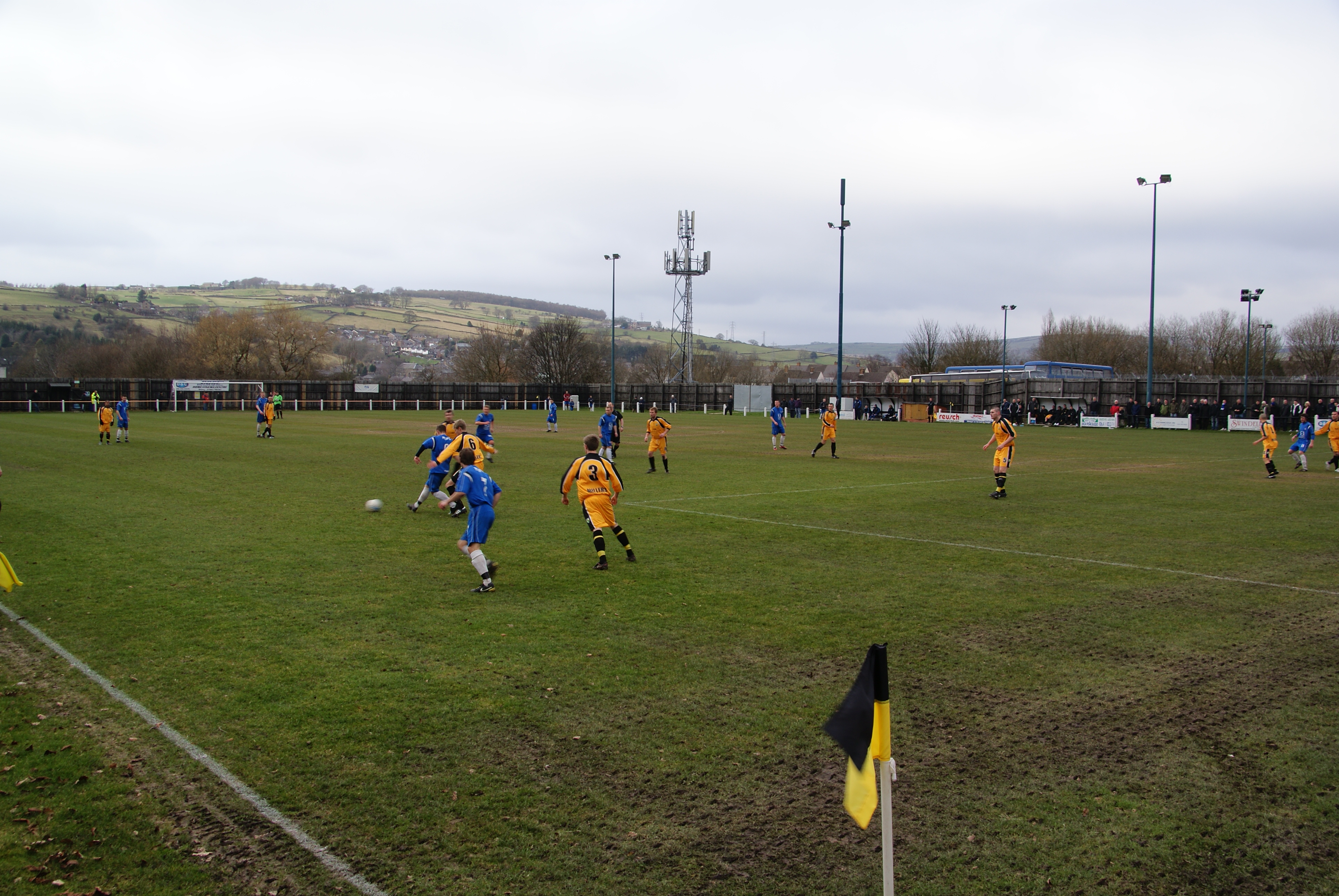
New Mills AFC v Ramsbottom United at Church Lane

The club eventually moved up to the Cheshire County League and later the North West Counties League. The club began to suffer financially, however, and in the summer of 1983 ceased playing in that competition.

Birch Vale and Thornsett F.C. were looking for a new ground and became tenants at Church Lane. Eventually, they took over running of the club and became New Mills Football Club.

The club rejoined the Manchester League and in 1977, thanks to a fund-raising appeal along with a grant from the Lottery Association, redeveloped its Church Lane ground to what it is today. In 2002–03 they became semi professional when their application to the North West Counties League was approved.

New Mills won the North West Counties League Division Two title in the 2007–08 season under the leadership of former Stockport County player Tony Hancock, who had joined as manager in 2005.

New Mills then followed up its Division Two title with a record-breaking 2008–09 season during which it set a new league and club record by winning 21 consecutive games, missing out on the Division One title only on goal difference to AFC Fylde, which beat the Millers 5–0 on the last day of the league season in front of a crowd of over 1,400. Two days after the disappointment on the Fylde coast, the Millers lifted the League Cup for the first time by beating Runcorn Linnets 2–0 at the Tameside Stadium, the home of Curzon Ashton. Goals from Garry Kharas and Scott McGowan ensured the Millers did not end the season empty handed. The star player during this era was Carlos Meakin who scored 150 goals in only 200 games, predominantly whilst playing in midfield.

During the close season of 2009–10, in which New Mills finished as runner-up for the second year in a row, manager Tony Hancock resigned but then had a change of heart and returned to lead the Millers until he again resigned in March 2010 when the player budget was cut. For the remainder of the season Ally Pickering was named caretaker manager and he took the role full time in 2010–11.

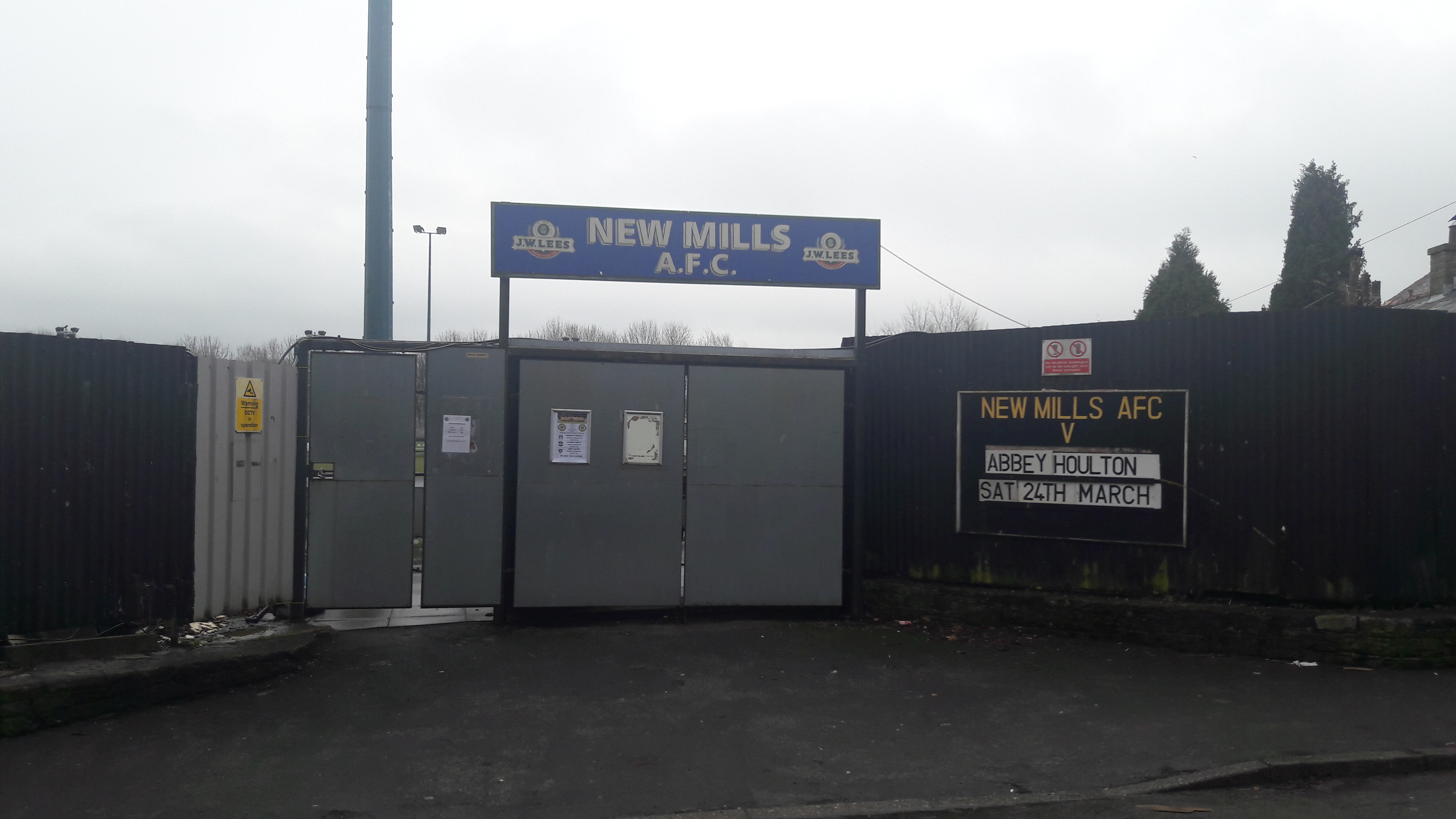
The entrance to Church Lane

Pickering had great success in his first full season as manager and led the Millers to the league title and promotion to the Northern Premier League. A league and cup double was denied though when Winsford beat the Millers 1–0 a few weeks later. During the 2011 pre-season to mark the club's 125th anniversary Alex Ferguson sent a Manchester United XI to Church Lane. United won 7–0, with their team including future England internationals Michael Keane and Jesse Lingard. In the 2011–12 season Pickering led the Millers to a 9th place after a poor winter saw the team slip out of the play-off places. New Mills were placed in the Southern League but after one season were switched to the Northern Premier League. Pickering remained in charge until October 2012, when he and the club parted company by mutual consent. Former FC United of Manchester coach Roy Soule became caretaker manager on Pickering's departure and almost led the team to another promotion – they lost 2–0 to Trafford in the play-offs. Soule resigned at the end of the 2014–15 season after a disappointing season, the club finishing 2nd from bottom and in the relegation places, and further significant budget cuts. The club accepted a reprieve from the FA to stay in the EvoStik league and Soule was replaced by former Stalybridge Celtic manager Keith Briggs. Briggs resigned just 23 days later after accepting a full time coaching role at Sheffield United and was succeeded by his assistant Andy Fearn, who appointed former Manchester City striker Shaun Goater as his assistant. Fearn and Goater resigned after nine matches, all of which were lost, and former Wythenshawe Town staffer Garry Brown took over, supported by ex-Stockport County winger Paul Williams. The club attracted national attention with their unenviable season record of 26 defeats from the opening 26 league and cup games and were infamously referred to as the 'Worst Football Team in England' (the team featured in a TV advert voiced by Harry Redknapp, and the chairman stated defiantly in a two-page article in the Daily Telegraph that "we're not scared of anyone"); they were relegated in April 2016 with only 3 points, from 3 draws, a Northern Premier League record low.

The Millers kicked off the 2016–17 league season with a 4–3 win over Cammell Laird under manager Garry Brown. This was the Millers' first win in almost 18 months. However, Brown resigned in September 2016 after a poor run of results, assistant Paul Williams taking over. In December 2016, with the team lying in the relegation zone of the NWCFL Premier Division, Williams was sacked and replaced by Calum Sykes, who had been in charge at nearby Stockport Town since its formation. Sykes immediately brought the entire Stockport Town team over with him, despite them playing in a lower division; the new team were unable to improve their league position and the Millers were relegated in April 2017, seven points short of safety. Sykes stayed until November 2017 but resigned after a poor run of results. His assistants Dowse and Cross stayed on as joint managers and despite some heavy defeats steered the club to a 14th-place position (halting a run of two successive relegations).

== Attendances ==
=== Records ===
- Largest attendance : 4,500 v Hyde United 9 September 1922.

Past averages:

- 2004–05: 160
- 2005–06: 244

Source: English football site

- 2006–07: 162
- 2007–08: 180
- 2008–09: 203

== Club records ==
=== Pre-1984 ===
- Best FA Cup performance: 2nd qualifying round, 1978–79
- Best FA Trophy performance: 3rd qualifying round, 1976–77
- Best FA Vase performance: Preliminary round, 1982–83, 1983–84

=== Post-1984 ===
- Best FA Cup performance: 2nd qualifying round, 2010–11, 2012–13
- Best FA Trophy performance: 3rd qualifying round, 2012–13
- Best FA Vase performance: 5th round, 2009–10

== Honours ==
- North West Counties Football League
  - Premier Division Champions: 2010–11
