= Abbey Hulton United F.C. =

Association football club in England

Coordinates: 53.04038°N 2.1486°W

Abbey Hulton United
- Full name: Abbey Hulton United Football Club
- Founded: 1947
- Ground: Birches Head Road, Abbey Hulton
- Chairman: Lee Savage
- Manager: Jonathan Beaumont
- League: Midland League Premier Division
- 2024–25: North West Counties League Division One South, 2nd of 18 (promoted via play-offs)

Abbey Hulton United Football Club is a football club based in Abbey Hulton, in Stoke-on-Trent, England. They are currently members of the Midland League Premier Division and play at Birches Head Road.

== History ==
The club was established in 1947. They joined the Longton League, before transferring to the Burslem & Tunstall League. The club were Division Two runners-up in 1973–74 and won the Division One title and the League Cup double in 1978–79. They then moved into the Fenton & District League and were Division One runners-up in 1981–82 before winning the Division One title, the League Cup and the Charity Cup in 1982–83.

In 1985 Abbey Hulton joined the North Staffs Alliance League after moving to their Birches Head Road Ground. Two seasons later they moved up to the Staffordshire County League. After winning the Division One and League Cup double in 1997–98, the club transferred to the Midland League. They were Midland League champions in 2003–04. When the league merged with the Staffordshire County League to form the Staffordshire County Senior League, Abbey Hulton were placed in the Premier Division.

Abbey Hulton were Staffordshire County Senior League champions in 2016–17, earning promotion to Division One of the North West Counties League. When the division was split in 2018 the club were placed in Division One South. In 2024–25 they finished second in the division, qualifying for the promotion play-offs. After beating Eccleshall 5–0 in the semi-finals, the club defeated Stafford Town on penalties in the final, securing promotion to the Premier Division of the Midland League.

== Ground ==
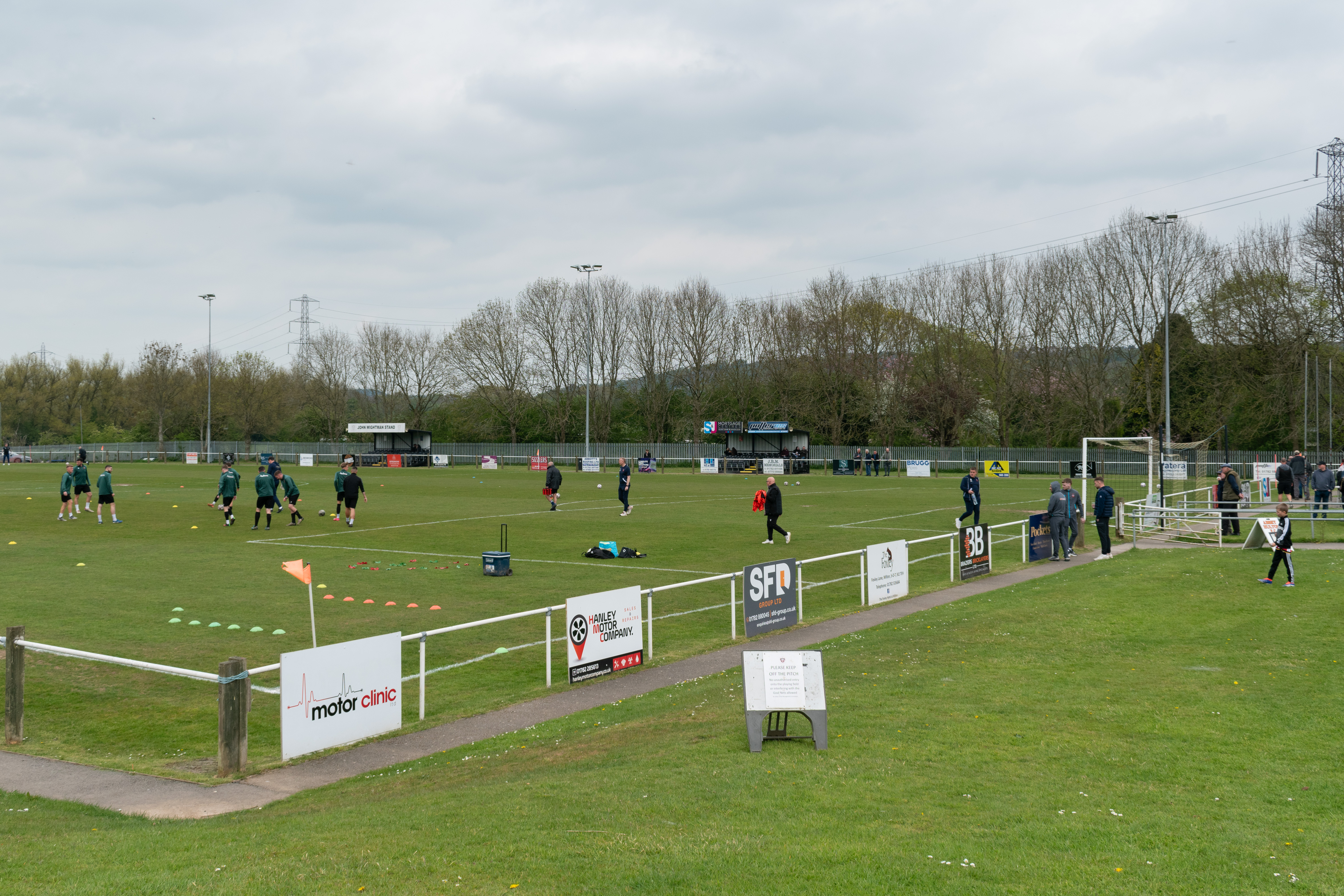
Home ground of Abbey Hulton United

For the first 15 years of their existence the club played on a site owned by the council, with the changing rooms located over a mile away. In 1962 they moved to Bucknall Park, where they played for the next 23 years. In 1985 the club bought a 99-year lease on a piece of land on Birches Head Road, where they built a clubhouse and established their current ground.

== Honours ==
- Midland League
  - Champions 2003–04
- Staffordshire County League
  - Division One champions 1997–98
  - League Cup winners 1997–98
- Fenton & District League
  - Division One champions 1982–83
  - League Cup winners 1982–83
  - Charity Cup winners 1982–83
- Burslem & Tunstall League
  - Division One champions 1978–79
  - League Cup winners 1978–79

== Records ==
- Best FA Cup performance: First qualifying round, 2025–26
- Best FA Vase performance: Fourth round, 2024–25
