= Warrington Rylands 1906 F.C. =

Association football club in England

Coordinates: 53.400°N 2.576°W

Warrington Rylands 1906
- Full name: Warrington Rylands 1906 Football Club
- Nickname: Blues
- Founded: 1906
- Ground: The Quickline Logistics Arena
- Capacity: 2,069
- Chairman: Mark Pye
- Manager: Neil Reynolds
- League: Northern Premier League Premier Division
- 2025–26: Northern Premier League Premier Division, 4th of 21
Home colours	Away colours

Warrington Rylands 1906 Football Club is a football club based in Warrington, England. The club currently plays in the Northern Premier League Premier Division, is an FA Charter Standard Club and its nickname is the Blues.

== History ==
The club was founded as Rylands F.C. in 1906 as a works team from a manufacturer of wire. The club started playing in the Liverpool County Football Combination league and then joining the Warrington & District Football League. The club had to wait until 1928 before winning their first Silverware, the Depot Cup. The 1950s saw the club became champions of the Warrington & District Football League Premier Division 6 times in a row, commencing from the 1953–54 season.

The 1968–69 season saw the club join the Mid-Cheshire League. The 1980–81 season saw the club finish as champions of the league, as well as making their debut in the FA Vase. The club collected another league championship trophy in the 1983–84 season. In 2008, the club merged with fellow Mid Cheshire league side Crossfields F.C. becoming Crossfields/Rylands F.C. After two seasons, the club reverted to Rylands F.C.

On 15 July 2016, Wayne Rooney's agent Paul Stretford stated he was aiming to get Rylands to the Football League after investing £100,000 in ground improvements. On 2 April 2018, the club published a letter from Paul Stretford which confirmed his proposed takeover would proceed, subject to due diligence. The 2018–19 season saw the club move to Division one south of the North West Counties Football League, and winning it at the first attempt, thus gaining promotion to the Premier Division. In the 2019–20 season, the club took part in their first-ever FA Cup qualifying campaign.

The club announced a name change in August 2020 to Warrington Rylands 1906 FC to reflect their locality.

== Ground ==
The club play their home games at The Quickline Arena.

== Current squad ==
As of 19 August 2026

Note: Flags indicate national team as defined under FIFA eligibility rules; some limited exceptions apply. Players may hold more than one non-FIFA nationality.

No.	Pos.	Nation	Player
1	GK	ENG	Luke Pilling
2	DF	WAL	Clive Smith
3	DF	ENG	Matthew Regan
4	DF	ENG	Guy Hall
5	DF	ENG	Patrick Gamble
6	MF	ENG	Adam Carrick
7	FW	ENG	Harrison Wood
8	MF	ENG	Charlie Munro
9	FW	ENG	George Waring
10	FW	ENG	Jake Burton

No.	Pos.	Nation	Player
11	MF	ENG	Ben Hardcastle
12	FW	ENG	Jawad Jebrin
14	FW	ENG	Ryan Tioffo
16	DF	ENG	Niall Battersby
—	DF	ENG	Malik Marshall
—	MF	RSA	Dean Furman
—	MF	NED	Morris Kromah
—	MF	ENG	Kyle Pendlebury
—	MF	ENG	Joe Riley

== Records ==
=== Rylands FC ===
- Best FA Cup performance: Extra preliminary round, 2019–20
- Best FA Vase performance: Third round, 1980–81, 1983—84

=== Warrington Rylands 1906 FC ===
- Best FA Cup performance: Third qualifying round, 2023–24, 2024–25
- Best FA Trophy performance: Third round, 2024–25
- Best FA Vase performance: Champions, 2020–21

== Honours ==
- Northern Premier League
  - Division One West Champions (1) 2021–22
- North West Counties Football League
  - Premier League Promotion (1) 2020–21
  - Division One South Champions (1) 2018–19
  - First Division Champions Cup (1) 2018–19
- FA Vase
  - Winners (1) 2020–21
- Mid-Cheshire League
  - League champions (2) 1980–81, 1983–84
  - League Cup (1) 1978–79
- Warrington & District Football League
  - Premier Division Champions (6) 1953–54, 1954–55, 1955–56, 1956–57, 1957–58, 1958–59
  - Depot Cup (1) 1927–28
- Warrington Guardian Cup
  - Winners (5) 1957–58, 1966–67, 1971–72, 1972–73, 2014–15
- Liverpool Challenge Cup
  - Winners (1) 1957–58
- Starkey Cup
  - Winners (1) 1952–53
