= F.C. Oswestry Town =

Defunct English football club

Coordinates: 52.8759°N 3.0264°W

FC Oswestry Town
- Full name: Football Club Oswestry Town
- Nickname: Town
- Founded: 2013
- Dissolved: 2020
- Ground: Park Hall, Oswestry
- Capacity: 2,034 (1,034 seated)
- Website: fcoswestrytown.uk
Home colours

Football Club Oswestry Town was a football club based in Oswestry, Shropshire, England. The club played at Park Hall and were affiliated to the Shropshire Football Association.

== History ==
The club was formed in 2013 as a successor to Oswestry Lions, who had folded, and took the Lions' place in Division One of the Mercian Regional League. After finishing third in their first season, they were promoted to the Premier Division. Their first season in the Premier Division saw the club finish fifth, as they also won the Commander Ethelston Cup. The club went on to win the Premier Division in 2015–16, earning promotion to Division One of the North West Counties League. The season also saw them retain the Commander Ethelston Cup as well as winning the League Cup and Shropshire Challenge Cup. The 2016–17 season saw the club enter the FA Vase for the first time.

In 2019–20 Oswestry were second in Division One South when the season was abandoned in March due to the COVID-19 pandemic. On 4 July 2020 the club resigned from the North West Counties League and folded due to financial difficulties caused by the pandemic.

== Ground ==
The club played their home games at The Venue, Park Hall, which they shared with The New Saints of the Welsh Premier League.

== Honours ==
- Mercian Regional League
  - Premier Division champions 2015–16
  - League Cup winners 2015–16
- Commander Ethelston Cup
  - Winners 2014–15, 2015 16
- Shropshire Challenge Cup
  - Winners 2015–16

== Records ==
- Best FA Vase performance: Second qualifying round, 2019–20
- Record attendance: 300, Shropshire Challenge Cup, 7 May 2016
