= 2020–21 North West Counties Football League =

The 2020–21 North West Counties Football League season was the 39th in the history of the North West Counties Football League, a football competition in England.

The league comprised three divisions, the Premier Division (at level 9 of the English football league system, Step 5 National League System) and two regional divisions at level 10 or Step 6: the First Division North and First Division South with the champions of each Division competing in a single match for the First Division Champions Cup. Additionally, there were two cup competitions: the League Challenge Cup (known as the Macron Challenge Cup for sponsorship reasons), a knockout competition open to all the league's clubs; and the First Division Trophy, a knockout trophy competition for First Division clubs only.

On 6 August 2020, it was announced by the League that the season would start no earlier than Saturday 3 October 2020 and subsequently that the League Challenge Cup and First Division Trophy competitions would be suspended this season.

The season was later suspended in December 2020 owing to the COVID-19 pandemic in England and was subsequently abandoned on 24 February 2021. Unlike the previous season, also abandoned owing to COVID-19, promotion to implement the National League System restructure plan proposed prior to the previous season was enacted at the end of this season: the promotion of eligible clubs (those who had applied for promotion) was based on the unweighted points per game basis over this and the previous season.

== Premier Division ==
North West Counties Football League Premier Division
- Season: 2020–21
- Teams: 20
- Promoted: 1874 Northwich; Bootle; Warrington Rylands
- Matches: 57
- Goals: 236 (4.14 per match)
- All statistics correct as of 26 December 2020 (at abandonment).

The Premier Division comprised the same 20 clubs from the previous season's aborted competition.

Rylands changed its name to Warrington Rylands 1906.

In line with the plan to restructure the National League System 5 clubs left the division prior to the commencement of the following season: 3 clubs, 1874 Northwich, Bootle and Warrington Rylands were promoted to the Northern Premier League Division One West using a points per match over this and the previous season basis; and 2 clubs, Hanley Town and Whitchurch Alport were transferred laterally to the Midland League Premier Division. (Congleton Town were initially selected to transfer laterally to the Midland League but successfully appealed against this).

=== League Table (at abandonment) ===
Pos	Team	Pld	W	D	L	GF	GA	GD	Pts	Season End Notes
1	Avro	8	5	1	2	23	9	+14	16	
2	Warrington Rylands (P)	5	4	1	0	15	4	+11	13	Promoted to Northern Premier; League Division One West
3	Northwich Victoria	7	4	1	2	12	9	+3	13	
4	Irlam	9	4	0	5	13	20	−7	12	
5	Runcorn Town	6	3	2	1	14	7	+7	11	
6	Hanley Town	7	3	2	2	12	9	+3	11	Transferred to Midland; League Premier Division
7	Winsford United	5	3	1	1	18	7	+11	10	
8	Congleton Town	5	3	1	1	9	8	+1	10	
9	Bootle (P)	3	3	0	0	14	5	+9	9	Promoted to Northern Premier; League Division One West
10	1874 Northwich (P)	5	3	0	2	12	8	+4	9	Promoted to Northern Premier; League Division One West
11	Burscough	3	2	1	0	8	5	+3	7	
12	Padiham	6	2	1	3	12	16	−4	7	
13	Longridge Town	4	2	0	2	9	5	+4	6	
14	Ashton Athletic	5	2	0	3	10	16	−6	6	
15	Whitchurch Alport	7	1	3	3	10	19	−9	6	Transferred to Midland; League Premier Division
16	Barnoldswick Town	8	2	0	6	11	26	−15	6	
17	Charnock Richard	4	1	1	2	7	9	−2	4	
18	Skelmersdale United	4	1	0	3	5	9	−4	3	
19	Squires Gate	9	1	0	8	15	29	−14	3	
20	Litherland REMYCA	4	0	1	3	7	16	−9	1	

Source: "Final Tables, Season 2020/21". nwcfl.com., "North West Counties League - North West Counties League Premier Division: 2020 – 21: League Table". nonleaguematters.co.uk.
Rules for classification: 1) Points; 2) Goal difference; 3) Number of goals scored; 4) Number of matches won; 5) Head-to-head results
(P) Promoted

=== Results (up to abandonment) ===
Home \ Away	18N	ASH	AVR	BWT	BTL	BUR	CHR	CON	HAN	IRL	LIT	LON	NWV	PAD	RNT	SKE	SQG	WRY	WHI	WIN
1874 Northwich		–	–	–	–	–	–	–	–	2–3	–	–	–	–	–	3–1	–	–	–	–
Ashton Athletic	–		1–5	–	–	–	–	–	–	–	–	–	–	–	1–2	4–0	–	–	–	–
Avro	–	–		–	–	–	1–3	–	1–1	5–0	–	–	–	–	–	–	2–1	–	3–1	–
Barnoldswick T	0–3	–	–		–	1–2	–	–	2–3	–	–	–	–	–	–	–	3–2	–	–	–
Bootle	–	–	–	–		–	–	–	–	–	–	3–2	–	–	–	–	7–2	–	–	–
Burscough	–	–	–	–	–		–	–	–	–	–	–	–	–	–	–	–	–	–	–
Charnock Richard	–	–	–	–	1–4	2–2		–	–	–	–	–	–	–	–	–	3–1	–	–	–
Congleton Town	–	–	–	–	–	–	–		1–0	–	–	–	–	–	2–2	–	3–2	0–3	–	–
Hanley Town	–	2–4	–	–	–	–	–	–		3–0	–	–	2–0	–	–	–	–	–	1–1	–
Irlam	–	–	–	2–1	–	–	2–1	–	–		5–2	–	–	–	–	–	–	–	–	0–2
Litherland R	–	–	–	–	–	–	–	–	–	–		–	–	–	–	–	–	–	–	–
Longridge Town	–	–	–	4–0	–	–	–	–	–	–	–		–	–	–	–	–	–	–	–
Northwich Vic	–	–	–	–	–	–	–	–	–	2–1	2–2	2–0		–	–	–	–	2–3	–	–
Padiham	0–2	–	1–6	0–2	–	–	–	–	–	–	5–1	–	–		–	–	–	–	4–4	–
Runcorn Town	–	7–0	–	–	–	–	–	–	–	2–0	–	–	–	–		0–3	–	–	–	–
Skelmersdale U	–	–	–	–	–	–	–	–	–	–	–	–	–	–	–		–	–	–	–
Squires Gate	4–2	–	–	–	–	2–4	–	–	–	–	–	0–3	–	1–2	–	–		–	–	–
Warrington Ry.	–	–	1–0	–	–	–	–	–	–	–	–	–	–	–	–	–	7–1		–	–
Whitchurch Alport	–	–	–	–	–	–	–	–	–	–	–	–	0–2	–	1–1	2–1	–	–		–
Winsford United	–	–	–	10–2	–	–	–	–	–	–	4–2	–	1–2	–	–	–	–	1–1	–	

Source: "Premier Division Results 2020/21". nwcfl.com.
Legend: Blue = home team win; Yellow = draw; Red = away team win.

=== Stadia and locations ===
Locations of the 2020–21 North West Counties Football League Premier Division teams

Team	Stadium
1874 Northwich	Townfield (groundshare with Barnton)
Ashton Athletic	Brockstedes Park
Avro	Whitebank Stadium, Oldham
Barnoldswick Town	Greenberfield Lane
Bootle	New Bucks Park
Burscough	Victoria Park
Charnock Richard	Mossie Park
Congleton Town	Ivy Gardens
Hanley Town	Abbey Lane
Irlam	Silver Street
Litherland REMYCA	Litherland Sports Park
Longridge Town	Mike Riding Ground
Northwich Victoria	Wincham Park (groundshare with Witton Albion)
Padiham	Arbories Memorial Sports Ground
Runcorn Town	Pavilions Sports Complex
Skelmersdale United	Valerie Park
Squires Gate	School Road
Warrington Rylands	Gorsey Lane
Whitchurch Alport	Yockings Park
Winsford United	Barton Stadium

== First Division North ==
North West Counties Football League First Division North
- Season: 2020–21
- Teams: 19
- Promoted: AFC Liverpool; Lower Breck; Prestwich Heys
- Matches: 53
- Goals: 239 (4.51 per match)
- All statistics correct as of 28 December 2020 (at abandonment).

The 2020–21 First Division North club allocations from the FA Leagues Committee (subject to appeal) were announced on 21 July 2020 The division comprised 20 clubs, 19 of which had competed in the division the previous season plus one addition allocated to the division:

- Bury AFC, a start-up phoenix club founded after the expulsion of Bury F.C. from the English Football League. Although the league accepted the club and had supported their application previously it did not support it at this time on the grounds that it discriminated against clubs in the Feeder Leagues (formerly Step 7) who were not considered for promotion.

However, the division was reduced to 19 clubs when Shelley, after playing a delayed League Challenge Cup semi-final carried over from the 2019–20 season, resigned shortly before the season's league matches began.

In line with the plan to restructure the National League System 3 clubs were promoted to the Premier Division: AFC Liverpool, Lower Breck and Prestwich Heys – all promoted using a points per match over this and the previous season basis.

=== League Table (at abandonment) ===
Pos	Team	Pld	W	D	L	GF	GA	GD	Pts	Season End Notes
1	Bury AFC	7	5	1	1	22	11	+11	16	
2	Lower Breck (P)	4	4	0	0	15	3	+12	12	Promoted to the Premier Division
3	AFC Darwen	7	4	0	3	20	16	+4	12	
4	Cleator Moor Celtic	9	3	3	3	21	20	+1	12	
5	AFC Liverpool (P)	4	3	1	0	15	7	+8	10	Promoted to the Premier Division
6	Prestwich Heys (P)	5	3	1	1	13	9	+4	10	Promoted to the Premier Division
7	Steeton	7	3	1	3	13	11	+2	10	
8	Golcar United	8	3	1	4	14	15	−1	10	
9	Ashton Town	8	3	1	4	14	18	−4	10	
10	Bacup Borough	3	3	0	0	9	2	+7	9	
11	Garstang	7	3	0	4	14	19	−5	9	
12	Pilkington	5	2	2	1	11	11	0	8	
13	AFC Blackpool	5	2	0	3	12	16	−4	6	
14	Chadderton	7	1	2	4	12	19	−7	5	
15	Holker Old Boys	3	1	0	2	8	10	−2	3	
16	Atherton Laburnum Rovers	3	1	0	2	3	5	−2	3	
17	Nelson	6	1	0	5	11	19	−8	3	
18	Daisy Hill	5	1	0	4	7	18	−11	3	
19	St Helens Town	3	0	1	2	5	10	−5	1	

Source: "Final Tables, Season 2020/21". nwcfl.com., "North West Counties League - North West Counties League Division One North: 2020 – 21: League Table". nonleaguematters.co.uk.
Rules for classification: 1) Points; 2) Goal difference; 3) Number of goals scored; 4) Number of matches won; 5) Head-to-head results
(P) Promoted

=== Results (up to abandonment) ===
Home \ Away	ABL	ADR	ALV	ASH	ALR	BAC	BUY	CHA	CLE	DSH	GAR	GOL	HOL	LOW	NEL	PIL	PRE	STH	STE
AFC Blackpool		2–4	–	–	–	–	–	–	3–1	3–1	1–3	–	–	–	–	–	–	–	–
AFC Darwen	7–1		–	2–0	–	–	–	3–1	–	–	–	2–3	–	0–1	–	–	–	–	–
AFC Liverpool	–	–		–	–	–	–	–	–	–	–	–	–	–	–	2–2	–	5–2	5–1
Ashton Town	–	–	–		–	–	–	4–2	–	3–1	–	–	–	–	–	1–3	–	3–1	–
Atherton Lab R	–	–	–	–		–	–	–	–	–	–	0–3	–	–	–	–	–	–	–
Bacup Boro'	–	–	–	–	–		–	6–2	–	–	–	–	–	–	–	–	–	–	1–0
Bury AFC	–	6–2	–	–	–	–		3–2	–	–	3–1	1–1	–	–	–	–	1–2	–	3–2
Chadderton	–	–	–	–	2–0	–	–		–	–	–	–	–	–	–	–	1–1	2–2	–
Cleator Moor C	–	–	–	2–2	–	–	–	–		2–3	–	1–2	4–2	–	4–3	2–2	–	–	2–2
Daisy Hill	–	–	–	–	–	–	–	–	–		–	–	–	–	–	–	2–5	–	–
Garstang	–	–	–	2–1	–	–	1–5	–	1–3	–		–	–	–	–	–	–	–	–
Golcar United	–	–	2–3	–	–	0–2	–	–	–	–	–		–	3–4	–	–	–	–	0–2
Holker OB	–	–	–	–	–	–	–	–	–	–	–	–		–	–	3–4	3–2	–	–
Lower Breck	–	–	–	5–0	–	–	–	–	–	–	–	–	–		–	–	–	–	–
Nelson	–	–	–	–	0–3	–	–	–	–	5–0	3–4	–	–	0–5		–	–	–	–
Pilkington	–	–	–	–	–	–	–	–	–	–	–	–	–	–	–		–	–	0–3
Prestwich Heys	–	–	–	–	–	–	–	–	–	–	3–2	–	–	–	–	–		–	–
St Helens T	–	–	–	–	–	–	–	–	–	–	–	–	–	–	–	–	–		–
Steeton	–	–	–	–	–	–	–	–	–	–	–	–	–	–	3–0	–	–	–	

Source: "First Division North Results 2020/21". nwcfl.com.
Legend: Blue = home team win; Yellow = draw; Red = away team win.

=== Stadia and locations ===
Locations of the 2020–21 North West Counties Football League First Division North teams

Team	Stadium
AFC Blackpool	The Mechanics
AFC Darwen	The Anchor Ground
AFC Liverpool	Rossett Park, Crosby (groundshare with Marine)
Ashton Town	Edge Green Street
Atherton Laburnum Rovers	Crilly Park
Bacup Borough	West View
Bury AFC	Stainton Park (groundshare with Radcliffe)
Chadderton	MCA Stadium
Cleator Moor Celtic	McGrath Park
Daisy Hill	New Sirs, Westhoughton
Garstang	The Riverside
Golcar United	Longfield Avenue
Holker Old Boys	Rakesmoor Lane, Barrow-in-Furness
Lower Breck	Anfield Sports and Community Centre
Nelson	Victoria Park
Pilkington	Ruskin Drive Sportsground
Prestwich Heys	Adie Moran Park
St Helens Town	Ruskin Drive Sportsground
Steeton	Cougar Park

== First Division South ==
North West Counties Football League First Division South
- Season: 2020–21
- Teams: 19
- Promoted: Stone Old Alleynians; Vauxhall Motors; Wythenshawe Town
- Matches: 64
- Goals: 236 (3.69 per match)
- All statistics correct as of 26 December 2020 (at abandonment).

The 2020–21 First Division South club allocations from the FA Leagues Committee (subject to appeal) were announced on 21 July 2020 The division was announced as comprising 20 clubs, 19 of which had competed in the division the previous season plus one addition allocated to the division:

- FC Isle of Man, a recently formed club. Although the league accepted the club and had supported their application previously it did not support it at this time on the grounds that it discriminated against clubs in the Feeder Leagues (formerly Step 7) who were not considered for promotion. Owing to COVID-19 pandemic-related travel restrictions on the Isle of Man in December 2020 the club, who had yet to play a league match, had its playing membership suspended for the season by mutual consent with the league thus reducing the league to 19 playing clubs.

In line with the plan to restructure the National League System 3 clubs were promoted from the division: Vauxhall Motors and Wythenshawe Town to the Premier Division and Stone Old Alleynians to the Midland League – all promoted using a points per match over this and the previous season basis.

=== League table (at abandonment) ===
Pos	Team	Pld	W	D	L	GF	GA	GD	Pts	Season End Notes
1	Vauxhall Motors (P)	8	7	1	0	19	6	+13	22	Promoted to Premier Division
2	Wythenshawe Town (P)	7	7	0	0	29	3	+26	21	Promoted to Premier Division
3	Sandbach United	8	5	1	2	23	16	+7	16	
4	Stockport Town	8	4	2	2	20	6	+14	14	
5	West Didsbury & Chorlton	6	4	1	1	18	11	+7	13	
6	Cheadle Heath Nomads	9	3	3	3	20	17	+3	12	
7	New Mills	6	3	2	1	6	5	+1	11	
8	Stone Old Alleynians (P)	6	3	1	2	13	9	+4	10	Promoted to Midland; League Premier Division
9	Barnton	6	3	1	2	10	7	+3	10	
10	Abbey Hey	7	3	1	3	13	11	+2	10	
11	Cheadle Town	7	2	2	3	12	10	+2	8	
12	Alsager Town	7	2	1	4	8	14	−6	7	
13	Cammell Laird 1907	7	2	0	5	6	10	−4	6	
14	Maine Road	7	2	0	5	9	16	−7	6	
15	St Martins	9	1	2	6	9	29	−20	5	
16	Ellesmere Rangers	4	1	0	3	4	12	−8	3	
17	Abbey Hulton United	7	0	3	4	9	22	−13	3	
18	Wythenshawe Amateurs	5	0	2	3	4	8	−4	2	
19	Eccleshall	4	0	1	3	4	24	−20	1	
20	FC Isle of Man	0	0	0	0	0	0	0	0	Suspended from the league

Source: "Final Tables, Season 2020/21". nwcfl.com., "North West Counties League - North West Counties League Division One South: 2020 – 21: League Table". nonleaguematters.co.uk.
Rules for classification: 1) Points; 2) Goal difference; 3) Number of goals scored; 4) Number of matches won; 5) Head-to-head results
(P) Promoted

=== Results (up to abandonment) ===
Home \ Away	AHY	AHU	ALS	BNT	CAM	CHN	CHT	ECC	ELL	IOM	MNR	NWM	SAN	STM	STK	SOA	VAU	WDC	WYA	WYT
Abbey Hey		4–4	–	–	–	–	–	–	2–3	–	–	–	–	–	1–0	2–1	–	–	–	–
Abbey Hulton U	–		–	–	–	2–2	–	–	–	–	–	–	–	–	–	–	–	–	–	0–5
Alsager Town	–	–		–	–	–	–	4–0	–	–	–	–	–	0–3	–	–	0–1	–	–	–
Barnton	0–4	–	–		–	–	–	–	3–0	–	–	–	–	–	–	–	–	–	–	–
Cammell L 1907	–	3–0	–	1–0		–	–	–	–	–	–	0–1	1–3	–	–	–	–	–	–	–
Cheadle Heath N	–	–	–	–	–		–	–	–	–	–	1–1	2–4	–	1–4	–	–	–	–	–
Cheadle Town	–	–	1–1	–	–	–		–	4–0	–	–	–	–	4–0	–	–	–	–	2–2	–
Eccleshall	–	–	–	–	–	1–8	–		–	–	–	–	–	–	1–10	–	–	–	–	–
Ellesmere R	–	–	1–3	–	–	–	–	–		–	–	–	–	–	–	–	–	–	–	–
FC Isle of Man	–	–	–	–	–	–	–	–	–		–	–	–	–	–	–	–	–	–	–
Maine Road	–	–	1–0	1–3	–	–	–	–	–	–		0–1	4–2	–	–	–	0–2	–	–	–
New Mills	–	–	–	–	–	–	2–1	–	–	–	–		–	–	–	–	–	–	–	1–3
Sandbach United	1–0	–	–	–	–	–	–	–	–	–	–	–		5–1	–	–	–	–	–	–
St Martins	–	–	–	–	–	0–3	–	2–2	–	–	–	0–0	2–3		–	1–1	–	–	–	0–8
Stockport Town	–	1–1	–	–	1–0	–	–	–	–	–	–	–	–	3–0		–	–	–	–	–
Stone Old All.	–	–	–	–	3–0	–	–	–	–	–	5–2	–	–	–	–		–	–	2–0	–
Vauxhall Motors	–	4–1	–	1–1	2–1	–	–	–	–	–	3–1	–	2–1	–	–	4–1		–	–	–
W Didsbury & Ch.	–	3–1	7–0	–	–	–	–	–	–	–	–	–	4–4	–	2–1	–	–		–	–
Wythenshawe Am	–	–	–	–	–	1–1	–	–	–	–	–	–	–	–	–	–	–	0–1		1–2
Wythenshawe T	2–0	–	–	–	–	–	–	–	–	–	–	–	–	–	–	–	–	5–1	–	

Source: "First Division South Results 2020/21". nwcfl.com.
Legend: Blue = home team win; Yellow = draw; Red = away team win.

=== Stadia and locations ===
Locations of the 2020–21 North West Counties Football League First Division South teams

Locations of 2020–21 North West Counties First Division South teams (Greater Manchester)
Locations of 2020–21 North West Counties First Division South teams (Isle of Man)

Team	Stadium
Abbey Hey	The Abbey Stadium, Gorton
Abbey Hulton United	Birches Head Road
Alsager Town	Wood Park Stadium
Barnton	Townfield
Cammell Laird 1907	Kirklands, Birkenhead
Cheadle Heath Nomads	The Heath
Cheadle Town	Park Road Stadium
Eccleshall	Pershall Park
Ellesmere Rangers	Beech Grove
FC Isle of Man	The Bowl, Douglas
Maine Road	Brantingham Road, Chorlton
New Mills	Church Lane
Sandbach United	Sandbach Community Football Centre
St Martins	The Venue, Oswestry
Stockport Town	Stockport Sports Village
Stone Alleynians	Yarnfield Lane
Vauxhall Motors	Rivacre Park, Ellesmere Port
West Didsbury & Chorlton	Brookburn Road, Chorlton
Wythenshawe Amateurs	Hollyhedge Park
Wythenshawe Town	Ericstan Stadium

== League Challenge Cup ==
The 2020–21 League Challenge Cup (known as the Macron Challenge Cup for sponsorship reasons) was a knockout competition usually open to all the league's clubs except for this season when, owing to irregularities the previous season AFC Darwen had forfeited their place. The competition was initially suspended and eventually cancelled in February 2021.

== First Division Trophy ==
The 2020–21 First Division Trophy was a knockout competition for First Division clubs only. The competition was initially suspended and eventually cancelled in February 2021.

== First Division Champions Cup ==
The 2020–21 First Division Champions Cup would have been played at the end of the season contested by the winners of First Division North and First Division South, however, owing to the abandonment of the league programme it was cancelled in February 2021.
