= 2021–22 North West Counties Football League =

The 2021–22 North West Counties Football League season was the 40th in the history of the North West Counties Football League, a football competition in England.

The league comprised three divisions: the Premier Division (at level 9 of the English football league system, Step 5 National League System) and two regional divisions at level 10 or Step 6. The latter were designated the First Division North and First Division South, with the champions of each division competing in a single match for the First Division Champions Cup. Additionally, there were two cup competitions: the League Challenge Cup (known as the Macron Challenge Cup for sponsorship reasons), a knockout competition open to all the league's clubs; and the First Division Trophy (known as the Edward Case Cup, named after the trophy), a knockout trophy competition for First Division clubs only.

== Premier Division ==
North West Counties Football League Premier Division
- Season: 2021–22
- Teams: 21
- Champions: Macclesfield
- Promoted: Macclesfield; Skelmersdale United
- Relegated: Runcorn Town
- Matches: 420
- Goals: 1,473 (3.51 per match)
- Biggest home win: Charnock Richard 9–1 Ashton Athletic (August 14)
- Biggest away win: Winsford United 1–7 Irlam (August 30), Vauxhall Motors 0–6 Macclesfield (February 22)
- Highest scoring: Charnock Richard 9–1 Ashton Athletic (August 14); AFC Liverpool 4–6 Burscough (October 9)
- Average attendance: 341

The following 5 clubs had left the division after the previous season:

- 1874 Northwich, promoted to the Northern Premier League Division One West
- Bootle, promoted to the Northern Premier League Division One West
- Hanley Town, transferred laterally to the Midland League Premier Division
- Warrington Rylands, promoted to the Northern Premier League
- Whitchurch Alport, transferred laterally to the Midland League Premier Division

The 2021–22 Premier Division club allocations from the FA Leagues Committee (subject to appeal) were announced on 18 May 2021 and its constitution was adopted at the league's AGM on 12 June. Subsequent to the announcement Congleton Town, who were selected to transfer laterally to the Midland League Premier Division, successfully appealed their allocation and remained in the division. The division comprised 21 teams, 15 of which competed in the previous season's aborted competition plus 6 additions:

- AFC Liverpool, promoted from the First Division North
- Lower Breck, promoted from the First Division North
- Macclesfield, a newly formed phoenix club
- Prestwich Heys, promoted from the First Division North
- Vauxhall Motors, promoted from the First Division South
- Wythenshawe Town, promoted from the First Division South

The inclusion of Macclesfield had a significant effect on attendances in the division: the average per match across the division was a league record 341 (greater than the previous high of 333 from the 2005–06 Division Two). Macclesfield recorded a record Premier Division average home attendance of 3,390 and at their home match versus AFC Liverpool on 2 April 2022 a single match Premier Division (formerly Division One) attendance record of 4,720 was recorded (the previous highest was 3,847 at F.C. United of Manchester v Formby on 28 April 2007).

At the end of the season 2 clubs were promoted from the division to the Northern Premier League Division One West: league newcomers Macclesfield as champions; and Skelmersdale United via an inter-step promotion/relegation play-off in which they defeated Cinderford Town of the Step 4 Southern League Division One South.

Only one club, Runcorn Town were relegated to the First Division North: second to bottom Litherland REMYCA were one of twelve (from 16) Step 5 clubs ranked on a PPG basis who were reprieved from relegation.

=== League table ===
Pos	Team	Pld	W	D	L	GF	GA	GD	Pts	Season End Notes
1	Macclesfield (C, P)	40	29	7	4	94	38	+56	94	Promoted to the Northern Premier; League Division One West
2	Skelmersdale United (O, P)	40	24	7	9	94	51	+43	79	Qualified for and won inter-step play-off, promoted to Northern Premier; League Division One West
3	Wythenshawe Town	40	23	9	8	83	43	+40	78	
4	Charnock Richard	40	24	6	10	106	69	+37	78	
5	Northwich Victoria	40	19	6	15	74	64	+10	63	
6	Avro	40	18	8	14	68	62	+6	62	
7	Burscough	40	17	8	15	69	62	+7	59	
8	Vauxhall Motors	40	18	5	17	63	77	−14	59	
9	Congleton Town	40	16	10	14	67	54	+13	58	
10	Irlam	40	17	6	17	62	68	−6	57	
11	Winsford United	40	15	9	16	73	73	0	54	
12	Longridge Town	40	15	7	18	74	83	−9	52	
13	Padiham	40	13	11	16	57	65	−8	50	
14	AFC Liverpool	40	13	10	17	80	80	0	49	
15	Barnoldswick Town	40	11	14	15	63	72	−9	47	
16	Prestwich Heys	40	13	6	21	59	79	−20	45	
17	Squires Gate	40	10	14	16	52	65	−13	44	
18	Ashton Athletic	40	11	10	19	65	97	−32	43	
19	Lower Breck	40	12	6	22	63	89	−26	42	
20	Litherland REMYCA	40	10	3	27	54	89	−35	33	Reprieved from relegation
21	Runcorn Town (R)	40	5	12	23	53	93	−40	27	Relegated to First Division North

Source: "Final Tables, Season 2021/22". nwcfl.com., "North West Counties League - North West Counties League Premier Division: 2021 – 22: League Table". nonleaguematters.co.uk.
Rules for classification: 1) points; 2) goal difference; 3) number of goals scored; 4) number of matches won; 5) head-to-head results
(C) Champions; (O) Play-off winners; (P) Promoted; (R) Relegated

=== Results Table ===
Home \ Away	ALV	ASH	AVR	BAR	BUR	CHR	CON	IRL	LIT	LON	LOW	MAC	NWV	PAD	PRE	RNT	SKE	SQG	VAU	WIN	WYT
AFC Liverpool		2–2	2–1	1–3	4–6	0–3	0–0	0–2	4–1	2–1	1–2	1–2	1–2	4–2	3–1	4–2	1–2	0–1	0–2	2–2	1–3
Ashton Athletic	0–5		4–0	2–2	2–2	0–3	0–1	2–0	0–5	2–2	1–0	1–1	1–1	3–2	3–4	2–4	3–0	0–1	4–5	2–2	0–1
Avro	2–2	5–1		1–1	3–3	3–2	1–1	3–0	5–3	0–2	3–2	2–0	2–1	3–0	0–1	3–0	3–2	2–2	0–1	0–2	0–2
Barnoldswick T	2–2	2–2	0–2		1–1	0–3	2–2	2–2	4–1	2–2	1–0	1–2	1–4	2–0	3–1	1–2	2–2	2–2	2–3	2–2	1–1
Burscough	2–3	3–1	1–1	2–0		3–0	2–1	3–4	4–2	3–0	2–0	0–4	2–0	1–2	1–2	1–0	2–2	0–2	0–2	2–0	5–1
Charnock Richard	2–2	9–1	2–0	4–1	2–1		4–3	2–1	5–2	2–2	4–4	1–1	5–2	2–2	1–2	2–4	1–3	2–1	0–3	5–1	1–4
Congleton Town	6–1	1–2	1–2	2–2	0–2	2–3		1–1	2–0	3–0	3–2	1–3	3–1	2–1	2–0	4–1	1–3	0–0	0–2	0–3	1–1
Irlam	0–4	1–1	2–1	0–3	2–1	0–1	0–3		1–0	3–1	1–4	2–2	1–3	0–1	1–4	2–2	1–0	0–2	3–3	3–0	2–0
Litherland R	0–5	3–1	1–2	4–0	0–1	2–5	1–5	2–3		3–1	1–2	1–2	0–4	1–2	4–3	0–1	2–2	0–3	2–0	2–2	0–1
Longridge Town	0–3	3–2	2–1	2–5	1–0	0–5	0–1	1–3	1–3		6–1	4–2	5–0	1–1	3–2	2–2	1–3	2–1	4–0	1–2	0–0
Lower Breck	2–2	1–4	0–2	2–1	1–2	4–0	2–2	4–0	2–1	1–5		1–3	5–1	0–0	3–3	3–1	0–2	1–3	3–1	4–3	0–2
Macclesfield	4–2	4–0	6–0	2–0	1–0	4–1	1–0	2–1	4–0	3–1	4–0		2–1	3–0	3–1	2–2	3–1	1–0	1–0	2–1	2–4
Northwich Vic	3–2	7–1	2–2	2–1	2–0	0–2	2–1	2–1	1–0	0–2	7–0	3–4		2–1	0–1	0–0	1–3	2–1	2–2	0–2	3–1
Padiham	2–2	1–5	2–1	0–0	2–0 (Note: Padiham v Burscough: match abandoned (85 Mins), score allowed to stand as the result)	0–2	3–3	0–1	1–1	2–2	2–0	0–2	3–1		2–2	3–1	0–2	1–1	1–2	3–0	1–4
Prestwich Heys	1–0	1–2	0–1	0–2	1–1	3–5	1–0	0–2	0–1	2–4	3–1	1–0	0–4	2–3		3–2	2–3	0–2	3–1	4–1	1–1
Runcorn Town	2–2	1–1	1–2	1–2	2–3	1–4	2–2	1–2	0–1	1–4	2–2	0–1	0–2	1–3	1–1		2–4	1–1	2–2	0–3	1–1
Skelmersdale U	4–1	3–1	1–1	3–0	4–1	1–2	3–2	2–0	3–1	1–2	2–0	0–0	2–0	3–0	2–1	5–2		4–0	5–1	2–2	2–2
Squires Gate	4–1	2–4	2–3	4–2	0–0	1–1	0–1	2–5	0–3	4–1	0–1	0–0	1–1	1–3	0–0	0–3	1–5		1–1	0–0	2–2
Vauxhall Motors	1–2	0–2	1–4	2–1	2–3	0–4	0–1	1–2	1–0	4–1	2–1	0–6	1–2	0–4	2–1	3–1	1–0	2–2		4–1	3–0
Winsford United	1–4	3–0	3–1	1–2	3–1	1–2	0–2	1–7	1–0	3–1	3–0	4–4	1–1	1–1	5–0	3–1	3–2	6–2	1–2		0–1
Wythenshawe T	2–2	4–0	1–0	1–2	2–2	4–2	0–1	1–0	5–0	5–1	3–2	0–1	1–2	1–0	4–1	7–0	2–1	2–0	5–0	1–0	

Source: "Premier Division Results 2021/22". nwcfl.com.
Legend: Blue = home team win; Yellow = draw; Red = away team win.

=== Inter-step promotion/relegation play-offs ===
For this season six runners-up from Step 5 (ranked on a points per game basis (PPG)) who had not qualified for automatic promotion played an inter-step promotion/relegation match against a third-from-bottom club from Step 4 (from those ranked with the fewest PPG), with the winners to play next season at Step 4 and the losers to play at Step 5. In their match Skelmersdale United defeated Cinderford Town of the Southern League Division One South 5–1 and won promotion to the Northern Premier League Division One West – Cinderford Town were subsequently reprieved from relegation.

30 April 2022	Cinderford Town	1–5	Skelmersdale United	Causeway Ground, Cinderford
15:00 (UTC+01:00)	Drew 80'		Howard 33', 47', 88', 90+3'; Conteh 65'	Attendance: 360

=== Stadia and locations ===
Locations of the 2021–22 North West Counties Football League Premier Division teams
Locations of the 2021–22 North West Counties Football League (Merseyside)

Team	Location	Stadium
AFC Liverpool	Crosby	Rossett Park
Ashton Athletic	Ashton-in-Makerfield	Brockstedes Park
Avro	Oldham	Whitebank Stadium
Barnoldswick Town	Barnoldswick	Greenberfield Lane
Burscough	Burscough	Victoria Park
Charnock Richard	Charnock Richard	Mossie Park
Congleton Town	Congleton	Ivy Gardens
Irlam	Irlam	Silver Street
Litherland REMYCA	Litherland	Litherland Sports Park
Longridge Town	Longridge	Mike Riding Ground
Lower Breck	Liverpool	Anfield Sports and Community Centre
Macclesfield	Macclesfield	Moss Rose
Northwich Victoria	Wincham	Wincham Park
Padiham	Padiham	Arbories Memorial Sports Ground
Prestwich Heys	Prestwich	Adie Moran Park
Runcorn Town	Runcorn	Pavilions Sports Complex
Skelmersdale United	Skelmersdale	Valerie Park
Squires Gate	Squires Gate	School Road
Vauxhall Motors	Ellesmere Port	Rivacre Park
Winsford United	Winsford	St Luke's Barton Stadium
Wythenshawe Town	Wythenshawe	Ericstan Stadium

== First Division North ==
North West Counties Football League First Division North
- Season: 2021–22
- Teams: 19
- Champions: Bury AFC
- Promoted: Bury AFC; Golcar United
- Relegated: St Helens Town
- Matches: 342
- Goals: 1,364 (3.99 per match)
- Average attendance: 225

The following 4 clubs had left the division following the previous season:

Three were promoted to the Premier Division:

- AFC Liverpool
- Lower Breck
- Prestwich Heys

and additionally

- FC Isle of Man were transferred for logistical reasons to the First Division South following a successful appeal against their original divisional allocation.

The 2021–22 First Division North club allocations from the FA Leagues Committee (subject to appeal) were announced on 18 May 2021 and its constitution was adopted at league's AGM on 12 June. The division comprised 19 teams, 16 of which competed in the previous season's aborted competition plus 3 additions all allocated into the division by the FA Leagues Committee:

- Campion, transferred from the Northern Counties East League Division One
- Ilkley Town, promoted from the West Yorkshire League
- South Liverpool, promoted from the West Cheshire League

Bury AFC, who suffered only one defeat over the season, equalled the league record with two clubs for the fewest defeats in a full season (both dating back to the 1980s: Radcliffe Borough in Division Two in 1982–83 and Vauxhall GM also in Division Two in 1988–89). Their average home attendance was 1,327 and with better than average attendances at their away matches they were responsible for the increase of average attendance at First Division North league matches to 225 (from 88 in the previous uninterrupted season of 2018–19).

At the end of the season Bury AFC were automatically promoted as champions to the Premier Division. Third-placed Golcar United who won the divisional promotion play-offs for promotion to Step 5 were transferred by the FA Leagues Committee to the Northern Counties East League Premier Division. Only one club were relegated: St Helens Town, a founding member club of the league who had played continuously in the league for 40 seasons, were relegated to the Liverpool County League. Both AFC Darwen and Atherton Laburnum Rovers were reprieved from relegation (as were all third-from-bottom and the best PPG rated 15 second-from-bottom Step 6 clubs respectively). Also leaving the division were Campion who were transferred laterally after one season back to the Northern Counties East League Division One.

=== League table ===
Pos	Team	Pld	W	D	L	GF	GA	GD	Pts	Season End Notes
1	Bury AFC (C, P)	36	27	8	1	92	32	+60	89	Promoted to the Premier Division
2	Holker Old Boys	36	24	6	6	74	35	+39	78	Qualified for promotion play-offs
3	Golcar United (O, P)	36	20	6	10	81	65	+16	66	Won the promotion play-offs, transferred to the Northern; Counties East League; Premier Division (Note: Winner from the four clubs who competed in the promotion play-offs)
4	AFC Blackpool	36	17	7	12	78	59	+19	58	Qualified for promotion play-offs
5	Nelson	36	17	7	12	78	65	+13	58	Qualified for promotion play-offs
6	Pilkington	36	16	8	12	76	78	−2	56	
7	Bacup Boro	36	15	9	12	78	54	+24	54	
8	Daisy Hill	36	15	6	15	69	66	+3	51	
9	Cleator Moor Celtic	36	16	4	16	84	75	+9	49 (Note: Cleator Moor Celtic were deducted 3 points for failing to field a side against Golcar United on 28 August 2021.)	
10	Garstang	36	12	13	11	76	70	+6	49	
11	Chadderton	36	14	7	15	54	61	−7	49	
12	Steeton	36	14	5	17	78	89	−11	47	
13	South Liverpool	36	12	9	15	57	67	−10	45	
14	Ashton Town	36	12	5	19	60	79	−19	41	
15	Ilkley Town	36	12	4	20	73	73	0	40	
16	Campion	36	11	7	18	69	75	−6	40	Transferred to the Northern Counties East; League Division One
17	AFC Darwen	36	12	3	21	68	92	−24	39	Reprieved from relegation
18	Atherton Laburnum Rovers	36	11	4	21	64	91	−27	37	Reprieved from relegation
19	St Helens Town (R)	36	4	4	28	55	138	−83	16	Relegated to the Liverpool County League

Source: "Final Tables, Season 2021/22". nwcfl.com., "North West Counties League - North West Counties League Division One North: 2021 – 22: League Table". nonleaguematters.co.uk.
Rules for classification: 1) points; 2) goal difference; 3) number of goals scored; 4) number of matches won; 5) head-to-head results
(C) Champions; (O) Play-off winners; (P) Promoted; (R) Relegated

=== Results Table ===
Home \ Away	ABL	ADR	ASH	ATH	BAC	BUY	CAM	CHA	CLE	DSH	GAR	GOL	HOL	ILK	NEL	PIL	SLP	STH	STE
AFC Blackpool		4–0	0–0	2–3	5–3	2–0	5–1	0–1	5–1	3–0	1–1	4–1	4–0	2–1	2–2	1–4	2–1	6–1	1–2
AFC Darwen	2–1		3–1	3–4	0–2	2–5	1–1	1–5	4–2	1–2	1–2	2–3	1–7	3–2	5–2	0–4	2–3 (Note: AFC Darwen v South Liverpool: replayed match, original match (31 July 2021, result 2–0) declared void as AFC Darwen used an ineligible player)	2–3	5–2
Ashton Town	1–2	3–2		2–1	3–0	1–3	3–3	1–1	3–2	1–2	1–2	2–2	2–3	3–2	1–2	4–0	1–3	2–1	2–6
Atherton Lab R	3–0	2–3	2–3		2–1	1–3	1–1	5–1	0–1	2–4	1–3	0–2	1–3	2–1	0–3	2–4	3–2	1–2	4–3
Bacup Boro'	3–2	3–0	5–0	6–0		1–2	3–1	1–2	2–2	1–2	4–1	1–1	1–0	3–0	3–2	5–1	1–1	6–1	3–3
Bury AFC	1–1	1–1	3–0	3–0	1–1		2–1	3–0	5–1	2–1	2–1	7–3	2–0	2–1	2–1	2–1	5–0	4–0	4–3
Campion	2–3	3–1	0–1	2–1	0–2	1–2		0–2	3–1	0–2	2–2	2–3	0–2	3–3	3–0	1–1	6–1	7–1	2–5
Chadderton	3–0	3–0	2–1	2–5	1–1	1–1	1–1		1–4	1–1	1–2	1–2	0–1	2–1	0–3	0–1	1–0	3–2	0–3
Cleator Moor C	1–2	0–2	2–1	3–1	2–2	2–2	7–1	2–0		2–3	2–1	2–3	1–2	3–0	5–3	3–0	0–2	10–0	5–1
Daisy Hill	3–2	1–1	3–0	4–2	1–1	0–2	0–3	0–1	2–3		1–4	1–4	2–2	3–2	2–3	4–0	1–2	3–2	3–5
Garstang	2–2	1–3	1–1	6–2	4–1	0–0	3–2	1–1	1–3	0–4		3–5	3–2	6–2	2–2	2–2	2–2	2–2	5–0
Golcar United	1–2	4–3	1–2	3–0	2–1	0–3	3–2	0–0	3–0	4–0	1–1		0–2	3–2	4–3	1–1	4–0	2–1	3–1
Holker OB	2–1	1–0	5–1	3–1	2–1	0–0	3–0	3–2	2–0	2–1	3–1	1–1		1–0	1–2	1–1	0–0	3–0	5–1
Ilkley Town	2–0	6–0	4–3	0–0	1–1	2–4	1–2	1–2	5–1	2–0	0–0	6–2	1–3		1–2	3–1	2–0	3–2	3–1
Nelson	3–0	3–1	4–1	2–3	0–4	1–3	1–2	3–1	2–2	0–1	3–3	2–0	2–0	3–2		2–3	0–0	2–2	3–0
Pilkington	2–2	0–4	1–3	5–1	2–1	2–2	3–1	2–1	4–2	3–3	3–2	2–6	0–2	4–2	1–4		2–2	4–2	3–0
Sth. Liverpool	3–3	0–1	4–2	1–1	2–0	0–2	1–3	2–3	0–2	1–0	3–1	1–0	0–3	2–3	2–2	5–1		4–1	1–3
St Helens T	1–3	2–7	0–3	2–5	1–2	0–5	2–6	2–5	4–5	1–8	1–4	3–2	1–1	2–5	3–4	1–4	1–3		4–1
Steeton	2–3	4–1	2–1	2–2	4–2	0–2	2–1	5–3	3–0	1–1	4–1	1–2	1–3	2–1	0–2	1–4	3–3	1–1	

Source: "First Division North Results 2021/22". nwcfl.com.
Legend: Blue = home team win; Yellow = draw; Red = away team win.

=== Promotion play-offs ===
The 2021–22 First Division North promotion play-offs, contested by the clubs that finished second to fifth position in the league table, were won by Golcar United who had been third-placed in the division.

Semi-finals
2	Holker Old Boys	2 (Note: After extra time played (score at 90 minutes 1–1))
5	Nelson	1
3	Golcar United	2 (Note: After extra time played (score at 90 minutes 2–2))	(5 p) (Note: Penalty shoot-out)
4	AFC Blackpool	2	(2 p)

Final
2	Holker Old Boys	1 (Note: After extra time played (score at 90 minutes 1–1))
3	Golcar United	2

Source="First Division North Play-Off Results 2021/22". nwcfl.com.

==== Semi-finals ====
9 April 2022	Golcar United	2–2 (a.e.t.) (4–2 p)	AFC Blackpool	Golcar
	Cox 14'; Flynn 44'		Duffield 58' (pen.); Robinson 80'	Stadium: Longfield Avenue; Attendance: 550

9 April 2022	Holker Old Boys	2–1 (a.e.t.)	Nelson	Barrow-in-Furness
	Dawson 11'; Mellen 104'		Foster 44'	Stadium: Rakesmoor; Attendance: 451

==== Final ====
16 April 2022	Holker Old Boys	1–2 (a.e.t.)	Golcar United	Barrow-in-Furness
	Walker 44'		65' (o.g.); Burnett 110'	Stadium: Rakesmoor; Attendance: 645

=== Stadia and locations ===
Locations of the 2021–22 North West Counties Football League First Division North teams

Team	Location	Stadium
AFC Blackpool	Blackpool	The Mechanics
AFC Darwen	Darwen	The Anchor Ground
Ashton Town	Ashton-in-Makerfield	Edge Green Street
Atherton Laburnum Rovers	Atherton	Crilly Park
Bacup Borough	Bacup	West View
Bury AFC	Radcliffe	Stainton Park (groundshare with Radcliffe)
Campion	Bradford	Scotchman Road
Chadderton	Chadderton	MCA Stadium
Cleator Moor Celtic	Cleator Moor	McGrath Park
Daisy Hill	Westhoughton	New Sirs
Garstang	Garstang	The Riverside
Golcar United	Golcar	Longfield Avenue
Holker Old Boys	Barrow-in-Furness	Rakesmoor Lane
Ilkley Town	Ilkley	MPM Lane
Nelson	Nelson	Victoria Park
Pilkington	St Helens	Ruskin Drive Sportsground
South Liverpool	Liverpool	Jericho Lane
St Helens Town	St Helens	Ruskin Drive Sportsground
Steeton	Steeton	Marley Stadium

== First Division South ==
North West Counties Football League First Division South
- Season: 2021–22
- Teams: 20
- Champions: West Didsbury & Chorlton
- Promoted: West Didsbury & Chorlton; FC Isle of Man
- Relegated: St Martins
- Matches: 380
- Goals: 1,532 (4.03 per match)
- Average attendance: 213

The following three clubs had left the division following the previous season:

- Stone Old Alleynians, promoted to the Midland League Premier Division
- Vauxhall Motors, promoted to the Premier Division
- Wythenshawe Town, promoted to the Premier Division

The 2021–22 First Division South club allocations from the FA Leagues Committee (subject to appeal) were announced on 18 May 2021; shortly thereafter Wem Town who were included in the allocation withdrew. The division constitution was adopted on 12 June at the league's AGM and comprised 20 clubs, 16 of which were in the division the previous season plus 4 additions:

Three were allocated into the division by the FA Leagues Committee, all transferred from the Midland League Division One:

- Brocton
- Rocester
- Stafford Town

and additionally

- FC Isle of Man, who returned from a suspension agreed for the previous season, transferred for logistical reasons following a successful appeal against their original allocation to the First Division North.

Over the course of this season FC Isle of Man's average home attendance of 1,612 was responsible for the increase of average attendance for the First Division South league matches to 213 (from 79 in the previous uninterrupted season of 2018–19).

At the end of the season West Didsbury & Chorlton were promoted as champions to the Premier Division. FC Isle of Man playing their first season in the league were also promoted, as divisional promotion play-off winners (they had finished as runners-up of the division). Only one club, St Martins, was relegated (to the Shropshire County League Premier Division); both Alsager Town and Rocester were reprieved from relegation (as were all third-from-bottom and the best PPG rated 15 second-from-bottom Step 6 clubs respectively).

Bottom club St Martins created many unfavourable league records: the first club to record no wins over a full season; the club with the fewest points from matches played (before points deductions), 2 points from 2 drawn matches; the highest proportion of losses to matches played (94.7%); the highest average goals conceded per match (6.4 per match, previously the highest was 4.1 by Blackpool Mechanics from the 1997–98 Division Two); the highest number of goals conceded (244 – exceeding the previous highest of 171 by Barnton from the 2017–18 Premier Division), St Martins scored 21 goals and therefore recorded the highest negative goal difference (−223, previously −135 by Stone Dominoes from the 2012–13 Premier Division); and were involved in setting a new league match single team and match aggregate goal record of 18 on 12 March 2022 when they were defeated 18–0 at West Didsbury & Chorlton.

=== League table ===
Pos	Team	Pld	W	D	L	GF	GA	GD	Pts	Season End Notes
1	West Didsbury & Chorlton (C, P)	38	28	7	3	114	29	+85	91	Promoted to the Premier Division
2	FC Isle of Man (O, P)	38	26	8	4	123	54	+69	86	Won the promotion play-offs, promoted to Premier Division (Note: Winner from the four clubs who competed in the promotion play-offs)
3	New Mills	38	25	9	4	112	44	+68	84	Qualified for the promotion play-offs
4	Abbey Hey	38	26	6	6	102	39	+63	84	Qualified for the promotion play-offs
5	Wythenshawe Amateurs	38	25	7	6	102	46	+56	82	Qualified for the promotion play-offs
6	Maine Road	38	19	5	14	99	63	+36	62	
7	Cheadle Town	38	17	9	12	87	55	+32	60	
8	Sandbach United	38	17	9	12	86	62	+24	60	
9	Cheadle Heath Nomads	38	13	11	14	88	86	+2	50	
10	Brocton	38	14	8	16	59	72	−13	50	
11	Stockport Town	38	14	6	18	77	57	+20	48	
12	Stafford Town	38	14	5	19	60	80	−20	47	
13	Barnton	38	12	7	19	61	78	−17	43	
14	Cammell Laird 1907	38	12	7	19	58	88	−30	43	
15	Ellesmere Rangers	38	11	9	18	73	88	−15	42	
16	Abbey Hulton United	38	13	3	22	64	82	−18	42	
17	Eccleshall	38	11	6	21	51	82	−31	39	
18	Alsager Town	38	8	5	25	47	89	−42	29	Reprieved from relegation
19	Rocester	38	8	5	25	48	94	−46	29	Reprieved from relegation
20	St Martins (R)	38	0	2	36	21	244	−223	2	Relegated to the Shropshire; County League Premier Division

Source: "Final Tables, Season 2021/22". nwcfl.com., "North West Counties League - North West Counties League Division One South: 2021 – 22: League Table". nonleaguematters.co.uk.
Rules for classification: 1) points; 2) goal difference; 3) number of goals scored; 4) number of matches won; 5) head-to-head results
(C) Champions; (O) Play-off winners; (P) Promoted; (R) Relegated

=== Results Table ===
Home \ Away	AHE	AHU	ALS	BAR	BRO	CAM	CHN	CHT	ECC	ELL	IOM	MNR	NWM	ROC	SAN	SMA	STF	STK	WDC	WYA
Abbey Hey		2–1	2–0	5–0	8–0	2–1	1–2	2–2	1–0	2–1	3–2	4–0	1–0	2–1	2–2	10–1	6–0	2–2	1–2	1–1
Abbey Hulton U	1–3		4–1	3–1	4–1	0–1	3–1	3–2	1–3	1–0	3–8	3–2	0–1	2–1	0–5	6–0	0–0	1–2	1–3	0–1
Alsager Town	0–5	1–0		0–1	1–3	2–3	3–4	0–3	0–1	2–2	0–3	3–1	2–3	0–1	0–4	7–0	0–1	2–1	1–2	1–3
Barnton	1–2	5–2	1–2		4–2	1–2	1–1	0–2	5–1	2–3	1–6	0–4	2–5	4–1	2–2	5–1	1–2	2–0	1–2	1–2
Brocton	3–0	1–0	2–1	1–2		3–2	2–0	3–3	4–1	2–1	0–1	3–2	1–1	1–1	3–1	3–2	1–0	0–4	1–2	1–3
Cammell L 1907	0–4	0–2	5–1	1–1	0–0		4–1	1–4	1–2	0–1	1–6	2–7	3–1	2–1	0–1	4–1	2–1	0–4	0–5	1–1
Cheadle Heath N	2–3	0–4	3–1	3–1	5–1	6–0		3–2	2–3	1–1	2–2	4–1	2–2	4–2	3–5	3–0	1–1	0–7	2–2	1–4
Cheadle Town	2–0	3–3	3–1	3–0	1–1	1–1	0–0		1–1	7–1	2–1	3–3	2–3	3–0	1–1	5–0	3–0	1–0 (Note: Cheadle Town v Stockport Town: replayed match, original match (4 September 2021, score 2–4) declared void as an ineligible player was used)	0–1	0–2
Eccleshall	2–3	0–1	2–0	2–0	3–2	1–2	2–2	3–2		2–3	0–4	0–4	0–5	1–1	0–0	6–0	0–1	0–2	0–5	6–4
Ellesmere R	1–2	4–2	3–3	0–2	0–3	2–2	3–3	1–8	3–0		2–3	3–5	1–3	2–3	1–1	7–0	1–0	1–3	1–0	1–1
FC Isle of Man	1–1	2–1	4–1	4–0	2–1	0–0	3–1	5–2	1–0	3–0		2–2	2–1	2–1	3–5	9–0	6–2	3–2	4–3	2–0
Maine Road	0–4	4–0	4–0	2–1	0–0	5–0	3–1	0–2	4–0	3–2	1–1		3–3	3–1	1–2	7–0	4–1	2–1	1–3	2–3
New Mills	1–1	3–2	4–0	2–2	2–0	4–2	4–0	3–0	3–0	3–1	2–2	2–0		5–0	4–0	4–0	5–1	4–2	1–2	2–2
Rocester	1–2	2–4	0–2	0–1	1–0	1–5	2–0	1–2	2–1	2–2	2–2	1–4	1–4		2–1	4–0	1–3	0–6	0–2	0–4
Sandbach United	0–1	6–0	2–2	1–1	3–1	3–3	1–3	2–1	2–1	4–1	2–4	1–2	0–3	4–3		6–0	2–1	2–1	1–1	2–1
St Martins	1–6	2–2	2–2	0–5	0–5	0–6	1–11	1–5	1–3	0–8	2–10	0–7	2–11	0–4	0–8		1–2	1–7	0–7	1–8
Stafford Town	2–1	2–0	0–2	1–2	4–1	2–0	3–3	4–3	1–1	3–4	1–5	0–2	1–3	4–0	4–2	11–0		1–0	0–3	0–6
Stockport Town	1–2	3–2	1–3	1–1	1–1	4–0	2–3	1–2	0–0	1–4	2–3	2–1	2–2	2–2	3–1	3–1	3–0		0–1	0–1
W. Didsbury & Ch	2–1	4–1	0–0	6–0	5–1	5–0	1–1	1–0	5–0	1–1	3–0	3–2	2–2	5–1	2–1	18–0	0–0	2–1		2–0
Wythenshawe Am	0–4	2–1	6–0	1–1	1–1	2–1	5–4	2–1	4–3	5–0	2–2	2–1	0–1	3–1	1–0	9–0	5–0	3–0	2–1	

Source: "First Division South Results 2021/22". nwcfl.com.
Legend: Blue = home team win; Yellow = draw; Red = away team win.

=== Promotion play-offs ===
The 2021–22 First Division South promotion play-offs, contested by the clubs that finished second to fifth in the league table, were won by FC Isle of Man who had been runners-up of the division.

Semi-finals
2	FC Isle of Man	3
5	Wythenshawe Amateurs	0
3	New Mills	1
4	Abbey Hey	0

Final
2	FC Isle of Man	4
3	New Mills	2

Source="First Division South Play-Off Results 2021/22". nwcfl.com.

==== Semi-finals ====
9 April 2022	FC Isle of Man	3–0	Wythenshawe Amateurs	Douglas
	Camarda 45+1'; Murray 59', 78'	Report		Stadium: The Bowl; Attendance: 2,758

9 April 2022	New Mills	1–0	Abbey Hey	New Mills
	Bevan 90+2'	Report		Stadium: Church Lane; Attendance: 418

==== Final ====
16 April 2022	FC Isle of Man	4–2	New Mills	Douglas
	Bass 27', 68'; Quaye 53'; Murray 58'	Report	Oakes 30'; Lowe 44'	Stadium: The Bowl; Attendance: 3,230

=== Stadia and locations ===
2021–22 First Division South: Location of clubs

Locations of 2021–22 North West Counties First Division South teams (Greater Manchester)
Locations of 2021–22 North West Counties First Division South teams (Isle of Man)

Team	Location	Stadium
Abbey Hey	Gorton	The Abbey Stadium
Abbey Hulton United	Abbey Hulton	Birches Head Road
Alsager Town	Alsager	Wood Park Stadium
Barnton	Barnton	Townfield
Brocton	Brocton	Silkmore Lane
Cammell Laird 1907	Birkenhead	Kirklands
Cheadle Heath Nomads	Stockport	The Heath
Cheadle Town	Cheadle	Park Road Stadium
Eccleshall	Eccleshall	Pershall Park
Ellesmere Rangers	Ellesmere	Beech Grove
FC Isle of Man	(Isle of Man) Douglas	The Bowl
Maine Road	Chorlton-cum-Hardy	Brantingham Road
New Mills	New Mills	Church Lane
Rocester	Rocester	Hillsfield
Sandbach United	Sandbach	Sandbach Community Football Centre
St Martins	Oswestry	Park Hall
Stafford Town	Stafford	Evans Park
Stockport Town	Stockport	Stockport Sports Village
West Didsbury & Chorlton	Chorlton-cum-Hardy	Brookburn Road
Wythenshawe Amateurs	Wythenshawe	Hollyhedge Park

== League Challenge Cup ==
The 2021–22 League Challenge Cup (known for sponsorship reasons as the Macron Cup) was open to all 60 clubs from the Premier and First Divisions North and South (indicated in the results listings below by '(PD)', '(FDN)' and '(FDS)' respectively). The final, played at Chorley F.C. was won 5–0 by Premier Division Charnock Richard who defeated First Division South Cammell Laird 1907. Charnock Richard's winning margin of five goals equalled the best to date in the competition (by Bacup Borough in 2012).

Owing to the COVID-19 pandemic-induced interruption of the league over the previous two seasons the competition was not sanctioned until December 2021, with the matches commencing in February 2022. Some fixtures were not played owing to withdrawal of clubs. For the first three rounds clubs were drawn into four regional groups that all initially contained fifteen clubs. One club in each group received a bye to the second round, these were: Group 1, First Division North club Pilkington; Group 2, Premier Division club Runcorn Town; Group 3, First Division South club Abbey Hey; Group 4, First Division South club Sandbach United.

=== First round ===
Tie	Home team (division)	Score	Away team (division)
Group One
1	Ashton Athletic (PD)	–	Burscough (PD)
1	No result recorded, Ashton Athletic progressed to next round		
2	Ashton Town (FDN)	2–1	Daisy Hill (FDN)
3	Atherton Laburnum Rovers (FDN)	0–5	Skelmersdale United (PD)
4	Charnock Richard (PD)	W–x	Cleator Moor Celtic (FDN)
4	Walkover for Charnock Richard; Cleator Moor withdrew		
5	Garstang (FDN)	1–4	St Helens Town (FDN)
6	Holker Old Boys (FDN)	W–x	Longridge Town (PD)
6	Walkover for Holker Old Boys; Longridge Town withdrew		
7	Squires Gate (PD)	2–3	AFC Blackpool (FDN)
Group Two
8	AFC Liverpool (PD)	2–0	FC Isle of Man (FDS)
9	Barnton (FDS)	2–1	Irlam (PD)
10	Cammell Laird 1907 (FDS)	3–2	Stockport Town (FDS)
11	Lower Breck (PD)	1–4	Wythenshawe Town (PD)
12	South Liverpool (FDN)	2–2 (4–3 p)	Litherland REMYCA (PD)
13	West Didsbury & Chorlton (FDS)	0–1	Vauxhall Motors (PD)
14	Wythenshawe Amateurs (FDS)	1–1 (4–3 p)	Maine Road (FDS)
Group Three
15	Barnoldswick Town (PD)	3–2	Steeton (FDN)
16	Bury (FDN)	4–1	Prestwich Heys (PD)
17	Chadderton (FDN)	0–0 (1–3 p)	Bacup Borough (FDN)
18	AFC Darwen (FDN)	W–x	New Mills (FDS)
18	Walkover for AFC Darwen; New Mills withdrew		
19	Golcar United (FDN)	0–2	Avro (PD)
20	Ilkley Town (FDN)	–	Campion (FDN)
20	No result recorded, Ilkley Town progressed to next round		
21	Padiham (PD)	3–2	Nelson (FDN)
Group Four
22	Abbey Hulton United (FDS)	1–3	Alsager Town (FDS)
23	Brocton (FDS)	1–1 (4–2 p)	Winsford United (PD)
24	Cheadle Town (FDS)	0–1	Cheadle Heath Nomads (FDS)
25	Congleton Town (PD)	5–0	Rocester (FDS)
26	Ellesmere Rangers (FDS)	–	St Martins (FDS)
26	No result recorded		
27	Northwich Victoria (PD)	1–2	Macclesfield (PD)
28	Stafford Town (FDS)	2–0	Eccleshall (FDS)

=== Second round ===
Tie	Home team (division)	Score	Away team (division)
Group One
1	Pilkington (FDN)	1–3	St Helens Town (FDN)
2	AFC Blackpool (FDN)	x–W	Skelmersdale United (PD)
2	Walkover for Skelmersdale United; AFC Blackpool withdrew		
3	Charnock Richard (PD)	1–1 (a.e.t.) (90m: 1–1) (7–6 p)	Ashton Athletic (PD)
4	Holker Old Boys (FDN)	2–2 (4–1 p)	Ashton Town (FDN)
Group Two
5	Runcorn Town (PD)	1–0	AFC Liverpool (PD)
6	Vauxhall Motors (PD)	1–2	Cammell Laird 1907 (FDS)
7	Wythenshawe Town (PD)	1–3	Wythenshawe Amateurs (FDS)
8	Barnton (FDS)	4–4 (3–2 p)	South Liverpool (FDN)
Group Three
9	Avro (PD)	3–2	Abbey Hey (FDS)
10	Bacup Borough (FDN)	3–3 (4–2 p)	Ilkley Town (FDN)
11	Bury (FDN)	3–1	Barnoldswick Town (PD)
12	Padiham (PD)	4–0	AFC Darwen (FDN)
Group Four
13	Brocton (FDS)	5–0	Alsager Town (FDS)
14	Cheadle Heath Nomads (FDS)	2–3	Congleton Town (PD)
15	Macclesfield (PD)	2–1	Sandbach United (FDS)
16	(not recorded)	x–W	Stafford Town (FDS)
16	No result recorded, Stafford Town progressed to next round		

=== Third round ===
Tie	Home team (division)	Score	Away team (division)
Group One
1	Skelmersdale United (PD)	6–1	St Helens Town (FDN)
2	Charnock Richard (PD)	W–x	Holker Old Boys (FDN)
2	Walkover for Charnock Richard; Holker Old Boys withdrew		
Group Two
3	Cammell Laird 1907 (FDS)	3–2	Wythenshawe Amateurs (FDS)
4	Barnton (FDS)	–	Runcorn Town (PD)
4	No result recorded, Barnton progressed to the next round		
Group Three
5	Bury (FDN)	0–0 (6–7 p)	Padiham (PD)
6	Avro (PD)	2–3	Bacup Borough (FDN)
Group Four
7	Macclesfield (PD)	4–1	Brocton (FDS)
8	Congleton Town (PD)	4–0	Stafford Town (FDS)

=== Quarter-finals ===
The groupings from the previous rounds were discontinued.

Tie	Home team (division)	Score	Away team (division)
1	Charnock Richard (PD)	3–1	Padiham (PD)
2	Cammell Laird 1907 (FDS)	1–0	Barnton (FDS)
3	Congleton Town (PD)	1–0	Bacup Borough (FDN)
4	Skelmersdale United (PD)	3–2	Macclesfield (PD)

=== Semi-finals ===
The only remaining non Premier Division club in the semi-finals, Cammell Laird 1907 progressed to the final (they also reached the First Division Trophy final).

Tie	Home team (division)	Score	Away team (division)
1	Charnock Richard (PD)	2–1	Skelmersdale United (PD)
2	Cammell Laird 1907 (FDS)	3–2	Congleton Town (PD)

=== Final ===
14 May 2022	Charnock Richard (PD)	5–0	Cammell Laird 1907 (FDS)	Chorley
13:00 BST	Daniel Regan 43'; Spencer Bibby 51'; Ross O'Farrell 74'; Nathan Nickeas 78'; Carl Grimshaw 89'	Report		Stadium: Chorley F.C. (Victory Park); Attendance: 516; Referee: Tom Elliott

source: "The Macron Cup Results: 2021/22 Season". nwcfl.com.

== First Division Trophy ==
The 2021–22 First Division Trophy (known as the Edward Case Cup, the name of the trophy) was open to all 39 clubs from the First Divisions North and South. Unusually the final was not played at a neutral venue but owing to post COVID-19 carry-over and by virtue of FC Isle of Man finishing highest of the two participants in the league table, it was played at FC Isle of Man's The Bowl. In the match FC Isle of Man defeated Cammell Laird 1907 1–0.

Owing to the COVID-19 pandemic-induced interruption of the league over the previous two seasons the competition was not sanctioned until December 2021, with the matches commencing in February 2022. Some fixtures were not played owing to withdrawal of clubs during the competition. For the nineteen First Division North and twenty First Division South clubs in the competition fixtures over the first two rounds were drawn between clubs in the same division: the first round comprised seven ties (five contested by North, and two contested by South Division clubs) to reduce the number of clubs to 32 for the second round which therefore included fourteen North and eighteen South Division clubs.

=== First round ===
Tie	Home team	Score	Away team
North Division clubs
1	Campion	1–0	Bury
2	AFC Darwen	3–2	Nelson
3	Holker Old Boys	3–0	Cleator Moor Celtic
4	St Helens Town	6–1	Bacup Borough
5	Steeton	1–1 (a.e.t.) (90m: 1–1) (3–4 p)	Ilkley Town
5	Fixture venue reversed owing to waterlogged pitch at Ilkley		
South Division clubs
6	St Martins	0–5	Ellesmere Rangers
7	Stafford Town	4–1	Brocton
7	Fixture venue reversed owing to waterlogged pitch at Brocton		

=== Second round ===
Tie	Home team	Score	Away team
North Division clubs
1	Daisy Hill	1–2	Holker Old Boys
2	Garstang	0–1	Ilkley Town
3	St Helens Town	2–3	AFC Darwen
4	Golcar United	1–1 (6–5 p)	Chadderton
5	Atherton Laburnum Rovers	W–x	Pilkington
5	Walkover for Atherton; Pilkington withdrew from the competition		
6	Campion	W–x	AFC Blackpool
6	Walkover for Campion; Blackpool withdrew from the competition		
7	Ashton Town	1–1 (6–5 p)	South Liverpool
South Division clubs
8	Stafford Town	2–2 (4–2 p)	Eccleshall
9	Cheadle Town	0–2	FC Isle of Man
10	Wythenshawe Amateurs	1–1 (5–4 p)	Stockport Town
11	Maine Road	1–1 (1–3 p)	West Didsbury & Chorlton
12	Abbey Hulton United	1–0	Rocester
13	Ellesmere Rangers	2–3	Sandbach United
14	Barnton	1–2	Cammell Laird 1907
15	Cheadle Heath Nomads	6–1	New Mills
16	Alsager Town	–	Abbey Hey
16	No result recorded		

=== Third round ===
This round saw the end of the separation of clubs by league geographic divisions. In the listings below clubs from North and South Divisions are indicated by '(N)' and '(S)' respectively.

Tie	Home team (division)	Score	Away team (division)
1	Campion (N)	x–W	AFC Darwen (N)
1	Walkover for AFC Darwen; Campion withdrew from the competition		
2	Ashton Town (N)	0–0 (4–2 p)	Cheadle Heath Nomads (S)
3	Golcar United (N)	1–2	Ilkley Town (N)
4	Sandbach United (S)	1–2	FC Isle of Man (S)
5	West Didsbury & Chorlton (S)	1–2	Wythenshawe Amateurs (S)
6	Atherton Laburnum Rovers (N)	2–3	Holker Old Boys (N)
7	Cammell Laird 1907 (S)	W–x	Stafford Town (S)
7	Walkover for Cammell Laird 1907; Stafford Town unable to raise a team		
8	Abbey Hulton United (S)	W–x	–
8	Abbey Hulton progressed to quarter-finals		

=== Quarter-finals ===
Tie	Home team (division)	Score	Away team (division)
1	Ilkley Town (N)	2–0	Abbey Hulton United (S)
2	Holker Old Boys (N)	4–3	Ashton Town (N)
3	AFC Darwen (N)	1–4	FC Isle of Man (S)
4	Wythenshawe Amateurs (S)	2–4	Cammell Laird 1907 (S)

=== Semi-finals ===
Tie	Home team (division)	Score	Away team (division)
1	Cammell Laird 1907 (S)	2–2 (5–4 p)	Ilkley Town (N)
2	FC Isle of Man (S)	2–1	Holker Old Boys (N)

=== Final ===
Owing to the post COVID-19 carry-over the final of the competition was unusually not played at a neutral venue but at FC Isle of Man's The Bowl, by virtue of FC Isle of Man finishing higher in the league.

21 May 2022	FC Isle of Man (S)	1–0	Cammell Laird 1907 (S)	Douglas, Isle of Man
	Jacob Crook 79'	Report		Stadium: F.C. Isle of Man, (The Bowl); Attendance: 3018

source: "The Edward Case Cup Results: 2021/22 Season". nwcfl.com.

== First Division Champions Cup ==
The 2021–22 First Division Champions Cup, a match to be contested by the champions of the First Division North and First Division South, was cancelled this season.
