= 2022–23 North West Counties Football League =

The 2022–23 North West Counties Football League season was the 41st in the history of the North West Counties Football League, a football competition in England.

The league comprised three divisions: the Premier Division (at level 9 of the English football league system, Step 5 National League System) and two regional divisions at level 10 or Step 6. The latter were designated the First Division North and First Division South, with the champions of each division competing in a single match for the First Division Champions Cup. Additionally, there were two cup competitions: the League Challenge Cup (known as the Macron Challenge Cup for sponsorship reasons), a knockout competition open to all the league's clubs; and the First Division Trophy (known as the Edward Case Cup, named after the trophy), a knockout trophy competition for First Division clubs only.

== Premier Division ==
North West Counties Football League Premier Division
- Season: 2022–23
- Teams: 22
- Champions: Vauxhall Motors
- Promoted: Avro; Vauxhall Motors
- Relegated: Ashton Athletic; Winsford United
- Matches: 462
- Goals: 1,540 (3.33 per match)
- Average attendance: 281

Three clubs had left the division after the previous season:

- Macclesfield, promoted as champions to the Northern Premier League Division One West
- Runcorn Town, relegated to First Division North
- Skelmersdale United, promoted as winners of an inter-step promotion/relegation play-off to the Northern Premier League Division One West

The 2022–23 Premier Division club allocations from the FA Leagues Committee (subject to appeal) were announced on 12 May 2022 and its constitution was adopted at the league's AGM on 18 June 2022. The division comprised 22 clubs, 18 remaining from the previous season plus 4 additions:

- Bury AFC, promoted as champions from the First Division North
- FC Isle of Man, promoted as promotion play-off winners from the First Division South
- Kendal Town, relegated from the Northern Premier League Division One West
- West Didsbury & Chorlton, promoted as champions from the First Division South

At the end of the season the champions Vauxhall Motors were promoted directly to the Northern Premier League Division One West where they were joined by runners-up Avro who defeated Lincoln United of the Step 4 Northern Premier League Division One East 2–1 in an inter-step promotion/relegation play-off. Bottom placed club Ashton Athletic were relegated to the First Division North whilst Burscough were reprieved from relegation owing to their points per game ratio being better than other Step 5 relegation candidates.

Also leaving the division, via a lateral transfer mandated by the FA Leagues Committee in the 2023–24 league allocations, to the Midland League Premier Division were Congleton Town and Northwich Victoria (the latter club was transferred following a failed appeal). Also slated for transfer to the same league were Winsford United who appealed the decision but were unsuccessful; however, they were unwilling to accept the transfer and through a strategy of applying for and being granted voluntary relegation to Step 6 they remained in the North West Counties League following their demotion to the First Division South.

As the season was ending in May 2023 the members of Bury AFC and those of Bury FC Supporters' Society voted to merge the two entities into a single club, Bury F.C.. The reconstituted club continued in the division next season and resumed playing at Gigg Lane the home of the former Bury FC club expelled from the Football League in 2019.

=== League table ===
Pos	Team	Pld	W	D	L	GF	GA	GD	Pts	Season End Notes
1	Vauxhall Motors (C, P)	42	30	5	7	85	35	+50	95	Promoted to Northern Premier; League Division One West
2	Avro (O, P)	42	27	6	9	75	31	+44	87	Won inter-step play-off, promoted to Northern Premier; League Division One West
3	Wythenshawe Town	42	25	8	9	109	56	+53	83	
4	Bury AFC	42	25	8	9	74	42	+32	83	Merged with Bury F.C.
5	Northwich Victoria	42	25	6	11	77	50	+27	81	Transferred to the Midland; League Premier Division
6	AFC Liverpool	42	20	7	15	83	63	+20	67	
7	Prestwich Heys	42	22	3	17	65	56	+9	66 (Note: Prestwich Heys had 3 points deducted)	
8	Congleton Town	42	19	8	15	70	62	+8	65	Transferred to the Midland; League Premier Division
9	West Didsbury & Chorlton	42	17	13	12	81	66	+15	64	
10	Litherland REMYCA	42	19	5	18	61	62	−1	62	
11	Charnock Richard	42	16	8	18	86	82	+4	56	
12	Kendal Town	42	15	10	17	72	84	−12	55	
13	FC Isle of Man	42	16	4	22	67	90	−23	52	
14	Padiham	42	14	9	19	66	69	−3	51	
15	Longridge Town	42	13	12	17	74	94	−20	51	
16	Lower Breck	42	14	8	20	54	62	−8	50	
17	Irlam	42	11	13	18	59	68	−9	46	
18	Winsford United (R)	42	12	10	20	56	78	−22	43 (Note: Winsford United had 3 points deducted)	Voluntarily relegated to First Division South
19	Barnoldswick Town	42	11	10	21	59	86	−27	43	
20	Squires Gate	42	12	5	25	61	96	−35	41	
21	Burscough	42	10	6	26	63	99	−36	36	Reprieved from relegation
22	Ashton Athletic (R)	42	4	6	32	43	109	−66	18	Relegated to First Division North

Source: "Final Tables, Season 2022/23". nwcfl.com., "North West Counties League - North West Counties League Premier Division: 2022 – 23: League Table". nonleaguematters.co.uk.
Rules for classification: 1) points; 2) goal difference; 3) number of goals scored; 4) number of matches won; 5) head-to-head results
(C) Champions; (O) Play-off winners; (P) Promoted; (R) Relegated

=== Results Table ===
Home \ Away	ALV	ASH	AVR	BAR	BRS	BRY	CHR	CON	IOM	IRL	KEN	LIT	LON	LOW	NWV	PAD	PRE	SQG	VAU	WDC	WIN	WYT
AFC Liverpool		0–2	1–0	3–0	1–1	1–0	1–3	8–2	5–2	2–0	5–0	1–0	3–2	0–0	1–3	2–0	5–1	2–0	4–2	5–3	1–2	1–3
Ashton Athletic	1–2		1–2	2–2	0–2	0–2	2–6	1–3	0–1	1–2	1–2	0–5	0–1	0–1	2–6	1–4	0–3	0–1	2–3	1–1	2–1	1–7
Avro	2–2	6–2		4–0	3–0	2–2	2–1	0–2	0–1	1–0	1–0	1–0	1–2	1–0	1–0	3–0	1–2	4–0	1–1	3–0	3–0	0–2
Barnoldswick T	2–1	1–2	0–3		1–1	0–2	2–2	1–0	0–1	3–3	4–1	3–2	2–4	3–3	0–1	1–1	3–5	0–2	1–1	2–1	3–1	3–2
Burscough	1–6	1–1	1–3	2–3		0–1	3–2	1–2	4–7	2–3	2–4	2–3	3–1	0–0	0–1	0–2	3–1	5–1	0–1	1–6	0–0	4–5
Bury AFC	2–1	1–1	0–1	2–0	0–3		1–0	2–1	4–0	1–1	1–1	1–0	1–1	3–1	2–0	2–0	0–2	2–1	0–1	0–0	5–1	1–3
Charnock Richard	3–3	3–2	1–2	2–1	3–2	1–2		5–3	5–1	1–0	1–1	4–5	3–1	2–1	1–3	3–3	2–3	3–1	2–0	5–1	2–2	0–1
Congleton T	2–0	4–0	0–0	1–0	2–0	1–1	1–0		5–1	1–1	3–1	2–1	4–4	2–1	0–1	1–2	1–0	2–1	2–0	1–1	3–2	2–2
FC Isle of Man	0–2	2–1	1–0	3–3	3–4	3–2	2–1	3–2		4–1	1–3	2–3	3–5	0–1	1–3	0–1	0–3	1–4	0–3	2–2	1–0	3–1
Irlam	2–0	5–3	1–2	0–0	1–2	0–2	2–1	3–0	3–1		3–4	0–2	2–2	0–0	1–2	0–0	0–1	0–3	0–2	1–1	3–1	1–3
Kendal Town	3–1	4–2	0–3	3–1	3–1	0–2	3–3	2–1	3–2	2–2		2–2	0–0	1–1	1–4	1–3	2–1	4–0	3–5	0–2	3–1	1–3
Litherland R	0–0	2–0	0–1	2–1	2–1	0–1	3–4	1–0	1–2	0–4	2–1		1–1	1–0	1–0	3–2	1–0	0–2	1–3	4–1	1–1	1–3
Longridge Town	0–3	2–2	0–4	2–2	2–2	2–3	2–1	2–1	1–3	4–2	1–2	0–1		5–1	2–3	2–4	2–1	3–0	0–4	0–8	2–2	4–4
Lower Breck	2–0	0–1	2–2	1–0	2–0	2–0	3–0	1–2	0–2	0–2	1–0	0–1	2–3		1–3	3–3	3–1	3–1	1–2	1–1	1–2	4–0
Northwich Vic.	2–0	3–1	0–1	2–0	3–1	1–6	3–0	1–2	1–1	4–1	0–2	2–2	1–2	2–0		3–2	1–0	5–1	0–2	2–1	2–0	0–0
Padiham	2–2	2–0	0–1	1–2	0–2	3–5	1–2	1–1	0–1	2–2	2–2	5–1	3–0	3–1	2–1		1–2	3–1	0–1	2–3	1–2	2–2
Prestwich Heys	0–2	1–0	1–0	2–4	3–0	1–2	4–1	3–2	1–0	0–0	1–1	1–0	2–0	1–0	2–2	4–0		3–1	1–0	2–1	0–1	0–2
Squires Gate	1–4	2–1	2–1	3–0	1–3	0–1	3–2	1–1	3–2	3–3	2–2	0–2	4–2	1–2	1–2	0–2	5–2		2–4	1–3	2–3	1–3
Vauxhall Motors	4–1	1–0	1–2	2–0	5–0	2–1	1–1	2–0	2–1	1–0	2–0	2–1	0–0	6–1	1–2	1–0	0–1	3–1		2–0	3–2	0–0
W. Didsbury & Ch	3–0	4–1	1–1	5–2	3–1	0–3	2–2	3–2	2–1	1–1	3–2	2–1	2–2	1–4	1–1	3–0	2–1	1–1	0–2		1–1	0–2
Winsford United	1–1	3–3	0–3	3–0	3–2	1–2	0–2	0–2	3–0	2–0	3–0	1–2	1–2	2–3	1–1	2–0	2–1	1–1	1–4 (Note: Winsford United v Vauxhall Motors: replayed match, original match (6 March 2023, score 1–0) declared void as Winsford United were temporarily suspended)	0–2		1–1
Wythenshawe T	4–0	5–0	1–3	2–3	5–0	3–3	3–0	2–1	2–2	1–3	5–2	3–0	3–1	2–0	3–0	0–1	3–1	6–0	0–3	0–3	7–0	

Source: "Premier Division Results 2022/23". nwcfl.com.
Legend: Blue = home team win; Yellow = draw; Red = away team win.

=== Inter-step promotion/relegation play-off ===
The Inter-step promotion/relegation play-off matches were between National League System Step 4 and Step 5 clubs, with the winner to play next season at the higher level and the loser at the lower. The division runners-up Avro defeated Lincoln United of the Step 4 Northern Premier League Division One East 2–1 to achieve promotion to the Northern Premier League Division One West.

29 April 2023	Lincoln United	1–2	Avro	Lincoln
15:00	Cotton 42' (pen.)	Report	Bentham 30'; Morrow 54'	Stadium: Ashby Avenue; Attendance: 410; Referee: Sam Wesson

=== Stadia and locations ===
Locations of the 2022–23 North West Counties Football League Premier Division teams
Locations of 2022–23 North West Counties Premier Division teams (Greater Manchester)
Locations of 2022–23 North West Counties Premier Division team (Isle of Man)

Team	Stadium
AFC Liverpool	Rossett Park, Crosby (groundshare with Marine)
Ashton Athletic	Brockstedes Park
Avro	Whitebank Stadium, Oldham
Barnoldswick Town	Greenberfield Lane
Burscough	Victoria Park
Bury AFC	Stainton Park, Radcliffe (groundshare with Radcliffe)
Charnock Richard	Mossie Park
Congleton Town	Ivy Gardens
FC Isle of Man	The Bowl, Douglas
Irlam	Silver Street
Kendal Town	Parkside Road
Litherland REMYCA	Litherland Sports Park
Longridge Town	Mike Riding Ground
Lower Breck	Anfield Sports and Community Centre
Northwich Victoria	Wincham Park (groundshare with Witton Albion)
Padiham	Arbories Memorial Sports Ground
Prestwich Heys	Adie Moran Park
Squires Gate	School Road
Vauxhall Motors	Rivacre Park, Ellesmere Port
West Didsbury & Chorlton	Brookburn Road, Chorlton
Winsford United	Barton Stadium
Wythenshawe Town	Ericstan Stadium

== First Division North ==
North West Counties Football League First Division North
- Season: 2022–23
- Teams: 18
- Champions: Pilkington
- Promoted: Chadderton; Pilkington
- Relegated: Cleator Moor Celtic
- Matches: 306
- Goals: 1,081 (3.53 per match)
- Average attendance: 119

Four clubs had left the division after the previous season:

- Bury AFC, promoted as champions to the Premier Division
- Campion, transferred laterally to the Northern Counties East League Division One
- Golcar United, promoted as play-off winners and transferred to the Northern Counties East League Premier Division
- St Helens Town, relegated to the Liverpool County Premier League

The 2022–23 First Division North club allocations issued by the FA Leagues Committee (subject to appeal) were announced on 12 May 2022 and its constitution adopted at the league's AGM on 18 June 2022. The division comprised 18 clubs, 15 remaining from the previous season plus 3 additions:

- Euxton Villa, promoted as third from the West Lancashire League
- FC St Helens, promoted as champions from the Cheshire League
- Runcorn Town, relegated from the Premier Division

Prior to the season AFC Darwen changed their name to Darwen.

At the end of the season champions Pilkington and promotion play-off winners Chadderton (who had finished as runners-up of the division) were promoted to the Premier Division. Bottom club Cleator Moor Celtic were relegated to the West Lancashire League. The two clubs finishing above them Ashton Town and Runcorn Town were both reprieved from relegation owing to a points per game (PPG) ratio better than other Step 6 relegation candidates and the number of clubs being promoted from the County Feeder Leagues being lower than anticipated.

=== League table ===
Pos	Team	Pld	W	D	L	GF	GA	GD	Pts	Season End Notes
1	Pilkington (C, P)	34	24	6	4	78	26	+52	78	Promoted to Premier Division
2	Chadderton (O, P)	34	23	7	4	76	45	+31	76	Won the promotion play-offs, promoted to Premier Division (Note: Winner from the four clubs who competed in the promotion play-offs)
3	FC St Helens	34	16	14	4	65	39	+26	62	Qualified for the promotion play-offs
4	Ilkley Town	34	18	6	10	64	48	+16	60	Qualified for the promotion play-offs
5	Euxton Villa	34	17	8	9	72	45	+27	59	Qualified for the promotion play-offs
6	Holker Old Boys	34	18	3	13	73	57	+16	57	
7	Steeton	34	16	5	13	65	52	+13	53	
8	Darwen	34	14	6	14	65	58	+7	45 (Note: Darwen had 3 points deducted)	
9	AFC Blackpool	34	14	6	14	63	64	−1	48	
10	South Liverpool	34	14	4	16	74	63	+11	46	
11	Nelson	34	13	4	17	56	64	−8	43	
12	Atherton Laburnum Rovers	34	12	6	16	47	57	−10	42	
13	Bacup Borough	34	12	5	17	58	63	−5	41	
14	Garstang	34	11	4	19	64	79	−15	37	
15	Daisy Hill	34	10	6	18	42	61	−19	36	
16	Ashton Town	34	9	8	17	35	68	−33	35	Reprieved from relegation
17	Runcorn Town	34	9	2	23	38	90	−52	26 (Note: Runcorn Town had 3 points deducted)	Reprieved from relegation
18	Cleator Moor Celtic (R)	34	4	4	26	46	102	−56	16	Relegated to the West Lancashire League

Source: "Final Tables, Season 2022/23". nwcfl.com., "North West Counties League - North West Counties League Division One North: 2022 – 23: League Table". nonleaguematters.co.uk.
Rules for classification: 1) points; 2) goal difference; 3) number of goals scored; 4) number of matches won; 5) head-to-head results
(C) Champions; (O) Play-off winners; (P) Promoted; (R) Relegated

=== Results Table ===
Home \ Away	ABL	ASH	ATH	BAC	CHA	CLE	DAI	DAR	EUX	FSH	GAR	HOL	ILK	NEL	PIL	RUN	SLP	STE
AFC Blackpool		0–0 (Note: AFC Blackpool v Ashton Town: replayed match, original match (13 August 2022, score 3–0) declared void as ineligible players were used)	3–1	2–1	2–4	3–0	2–2	2–1	0–2	4–2	4–2	5–1	2–2	2–1	0–2	2–3	2–0	1–2
Ashton Town	2–1		0–1	3–3	0–3	2–0	1–0	5–3	1–1	1–1	1–0	0–1	1–4	1–2	0–0	2–1	0–0	1–3
Atherton Lab R	0–0	1–1		1–2	1–2	2–1	1–1	0–1	2–3	1–1	0–2	2–1	2–0	2–4	1–6	2–0	1–3	1–0
Bacup Boro'	0–2	4–1	1–0		3–4	3–2	0–0	3–1	2–3	2–3	1–2	0–0	0–1	4–3	0–4	6–1	1–2	2–0
Chadderton	1–3	2–0	1–0	0–0		5–2	1–1	2–0	3–2	1–1	5–4	3–2	1–0	1–2	0–2	4–1	2–1	3–1
Cleator Moor C	0–3	2–2	1–2	0–3	0–3		0–1	1–3	2–4	2–2	4–3	2–4	2–4	2–3	0–2	3–1	1–8	0–3
Daisy Hill	3–1	0–1	1–2	0–1	3–1	0–4		5–2	2–1	0–2	2–2	3–2	2–3	2–1	0–2	1–2	0–4	0–3
Darwen	2–1	7–0	2–1	2–3	1–3	5–1	2–1		1–0	1–2	0–3	0–1	0–3	3–2	0–2	6–0	2–2	2–1
Euxton Villa	7–1	2–0	1–2	1–1	2–4	1–1	1–0	2–2		1–1	5–2	4–0	1–1	4–0	0–1	3–1	1–1	1–2
FC St Helens	2–0	6–0	2–2	1–2	1–1	2–2	2–0	1–1	2–3		1–1	3–1	0–0	3–1	2–1	1–0	2–1	2–0
Garstang	1–3	0–2	4–3	5–3	0–2	5–3	4–0	1–1	4–1	1–3		0–6	0–0	3–1	0–3	4–1	3–4	2–1
Holker OB	4–3	6–2	2–1	3–1	1–1	4–0	1–2	2–4	1–3	3–1	3–0		1–0	0–1	0–1	5–1	2–3	3–3
Ilkley Town	2–1	1–2	1–0	2–1	3–4	4–3	2–1	1–1	1–2	1–1	2–0	1–3		2–3	2–3	3–0	3–2	2–0
Nelson	2–2	2–0	2–3	2–1	2–3	0–3	1–1	3–2	1–0	2–2	1–0	2–3	2–3		0–1	3–0	1–4	0–1
Pilkington	5–1	5–1	2–2	2–1	0–0	4–0	4–0	0–0	0–1	1–1	3–1	3–2	2–3	2–0		4–1	3–1	1–2
Runcorn Town	1–1	2–0	2–1	3–1	1–2	3–1	1–0	0–3	1–5	0–4	3–1	0–1	1–3	1–1	2–4		2–1	2–3
Sth. Liverpool	5–1	2–1	2–3	4–1	2–3	2–0	2–4	1–4	1–3	1–2	4–2	1–2	0–4	2–1	1–2	5–0		1–3
Steeton	1–3	2–1	2–3	3–1	1–1	6–1	2–4	3–0	1–1	1–3	3–2	1–2	4–0	1–4	1–1	4–0	1–1	

Source: "First Division North Results 2022/23". nwcfl.com.
Legend: Blue = home team win; Yellow = draw; Red = away team win.

=== Promotion play-offs ===
The 2022–23 First Division North promotion play-offs, contested by the clubs that finished second to fifth position in the league table, were won by Chadderton who had been runners-up of the division – they required extended penalty shoot-outs to win both their matches in the play-offs.

Semi-finals
2	Chadderton	1	(9 p) (Note: Penalty shoot-out)
5	Euxton Villa	1	(8 p)
3	FC St Helens	2	(3 p) (Note: Penalty shoot-out)
4	Ilkley Town	2	(2 p)

Final
2	Chadderton	1	(6 p) (Note: Penalty shoot-out)
3	FC St Helens	1	(5 p)

Source="First Division North Play-Off Results 2022/23". nwcfl.com.

==== Semi-finals ====
22 April 2023	Chadderton	1–1 (a.e.t.) (9–8 p)	Euxton Villa	Chadderton
	Clarke 89'		Singleton 52'	Stadium: Andrew Street; Attendance: 210

22 April 2023	FC St Helens	2–2 (a.e.t.) (3–2 p)	Ilkley Town	St Helens
	Whelan 3'; Barker 63'		Smith 47'; Dean 55'	Stadium: Windleshaw Sports

==== Final ====
29 April 2023	Chadderton	1–1 (a.e.t.) (6–5 p)	FC St Helens	Chadderton
	Goddard 2'		Barker 47'	Stadium: Andrew Street; Attendance: 723

=== Stadia and locations ===
Locations of the 2022–23 North West Counties Football League First Division North teams

Team	Stadium
AFC Blackpool	The Mechanics
Ashton Town	Edge Green Street
Atherton Laburnum Rovers	Crilly Park
Bacup Borough	West View
Chadderton	MCA Stadium
Cleator Moor Celtic	McGrath Park
Daisy Hill	New Sirs, Westhoughton
Darwen	The Anchor Ground
Euxton Villa	Jim Fowler Memorial Ground
FC St Helens	Windleshaw Sports
Garstang	The Riverside
Holker Old Boys	Rakesmoor Lane, Barrow-in-Furness
Ilkley Town	MPM Lane
Nelson	Victoria Park
Pilkington	Ruskin Drive Sportsground
Runcorn Town	Pavilions Sports Complex
South Liverpool	Jericho Lane
Steeton	Cougar Park

== First Division South ==
North West Counties Football League First Division South
- Season: 2022–23
- Teams: 20
- Champions: Wythenshawe Amateurs
- Promoted: Wythenshawe Amateurs; Cheadle Town
- Relegated: Ellesmere Rangers (voluntary); Foley Meir; Rocester
- Matches: 380
- Goals: 1,314 (3.46 per match)
- Average attendance: 117

Three clubs had left the division after the previous season:

- FC Isle of Man, promoted as promotion play-off winners to the Premier Division
- St Martins, relegated to the Shropshire County Football League
- West Didsbury & Chorlton, promoted as champions to the Premier Division

The 2022–23 First Division South club allocations from the FA Leagues Committee (subject to appeal) were announced on 12 May 2022, and its constitution adopted at the league's AGM on 18 June 2022. The division comprised 20 clubs, 17 remaining from the previous season plus 3 additions (all promoted from County Feeder Leagues):

- Ashville, promoted as runners-up from the West Cheshire League
- Foley Meir, promoted as champions from the Staffordshire County Senior League
- Stockport Georgians, promoted as third from the Manchester League

At the end of the season champions Wythenshawe Amateurs and promotion play-off winners Cheadle Town (who had finished fifth in the division) were promoted to the Premier Division. The bottom two clubs Foley Meir (who had joined the league this season) and Rocester were relegated to the Staffordshire County Senior League. The club finishing above them Stafford Town were reprieved from relegation. Also belatedly leaving the division were Ellesmere Rangers, with news of their resignation announced on 21 June 2023.

=== League table ===
Pos	Team	Pld	W	D	L	GF	GA	GD	Pts	Season End Notes
1	Wythenshawe Amateurs (C, P)	38	30	3	5	89	28	+61	93	Promoted to Premier Division
2	Stockport Town	38	29	5	4	108	32	+76	92	Qualified for promotion play-offs
3	Sandbach United	38	25	4	9	95	59	+36	79	Qualified for promotion play-offs
4	Brocton	38	25	4	9	88	57	+31	79	Qualified for promotion play-offs
5	Cheadle Town (O, P)	38	22	4	12	91	59	+32	70	Won the promotion play-offs, promoted to Premier Division (Note: Winner from the four clubs who competed in the promotion play-offs)
6	Ellesmere Rangers (R)	38	19	6	13	79	55	+24	63	Resigned, to the Shropshire; County League Premier Division
7	New Mills	38	18	9	11	83	62	+21	63	
8	Cheadle Heath Nomads	38	14	12	12	75	57	+18	54	
9	Stockport Georgians	38	15	9	14	55	51	+4	54	
10	Eccleshall	38	15	9	14	50	59	−9	54	
11	Maine Road	38	16	5	17	58	61	−3	53	
12	Ashville	38	15	6	17	62	62	0	51	
13	Barnton	38	15	6	17	57	62	−5	51	
14	Abbey Hulton United	38	13	8	17	57	53	+4	47	
15	Abbey Hey	38	13	7	18	58	72	−14	46	
16	Alsager Town	38	10	6	22	43	62	−19	36	
17	Cammell Laird 1907	38	9	6	23	51	86	−35	33	
18	Stafford Town	38	8	3	27	46	107	−61	27	Reprieved from relegation
19	Foley Meir (R)	38	7	4	27	43	111	−68	25	Relegated to the Staffordshire; County Senior League
20	Rocester (R)	38	3	2	33	26	119	−93	11	Relegated to the Staffordshire; County Senior League

Source: "Final Tables, Season 2022/23". nwcfl.com., Non League Matters
Rules for classification: 1) points; 2) goal difference; 3) number of goals scored; 4) number of matches won; 5) head-to-head results
(C) Champions; (O) Play-off winners; (P) Promoted; (R) Relegated

=== Results Table ===
Home \ Away	AHE	AHU	ALS	ASH	BAR	BRO	CAM	CHN	CHT	ECC	ELL	FOL	MNR	NWM	ROC	SAN	STF	STG	STK	WYA
Abbey Hey		1–5	1–2	2–4	1–1	0–3	1–0	2–2	0–2	3–1	1–0	3–2	2–0	2–1	3–1	2–2	4–2	0–0	1–2	0–1
Abbey Hulton U	1–1		2–1	4–0	2–1	2–2	2–1	0–0	1–1	1–2	0–2	7–1	0–2	3–0	1–2	0–1	1–0	0–0	0–1	1–2
Alsager Town	2–2	2–1		2–1	1–2	0–1	1–2	5–0	2–0	1–1	0–2	0–2	1–2	1–1	2–1	1–2	3–0	0–4	2–4	1–2
Ashville	4–0	2–3	1–2		5–2	2–2	3–0	4–2	0–2	3–0	1–4 (Note: Ashville v Ellesmere Rangers: match abandoned (88 mins), score allowed to stand as the result)	0–0	1–2	1–2	2–0	0–0	4–0	2–1	2–0	0–1
Barnton	3–0	1–0	2–0	1–2		2–2	2–1	2–0	0–3	1–1	3–1	2–2	2–1	1–3	3–0	3–4	2–1	1–3	0–1	0–1
Brocton	1–0	1–3	3–1	4–0	5–1		2–3	3–1	6–2	2–1	3–2	2–1	4–3	3–0	2–1	3–1	5–0	1–0	0–2	1–2
Cammell L 1907	0–3	2–2	2–0	0–1	0–2	2–2		3–3	1–3	2–2	0–5	5–1	4–3	3–2	2–1	2–3	0–3	1–3	0–3	0–1
Cheadle Heath N	0–2	1–2	1–0	1–1	0–1	4–0	3–0		5–2	1–1	4–1	1–2	1–1	0–0	4–0	1–3	8–2	5–1	3–5	2–0
Cheadle Town	4–2	2–0	3–0	3–0	1–1	5–2	2–0	2–4		1–3	1–2	12–0	1–3	0–1	7–2	4–3	1–0	1–0	1–3	3–2
Eccleshall	4–2	2–0	1–1	0–0	2–1	1–4	1–0	0–0	1–2		1–1	4–0	3–2	0–1	3–0	0–2	0–1	1–0	1–5	0–5
Ellesmere R	1–1	2–1	2–1	3–1	1–2	0–2	4–2	1–3	0–0	0–2		3–1	2–1	3–4	6–1	3–1	1–0	4–0	2–2	3–3
Foley Meir	2–6	3–1	2–1	0–3	0–2	0–2	2–2	2–1	1–3	0–2	1–5		0–1	1–2	1–2	0–4	3–1	0–1	0–2	0–4
Maine Road	0–2	1–0	0–1	2–0	0–4	1–2	3–3	2–2	1–3	1–0	1–0	3–3		0–0	4–0	1–2	4–1	3–4	0–4	1–0
New Mills	2–1	3–0	1–1	1–3	3–3	3–4	1–0	1–3	4–2	0–2	4–1	5–2	1–2		8–0	4–1	1–1	2–2	2–2	1–3
Rocester	0–3	0–0	1–2	1–1	3–2	0–2	2–3	0–2	0–4	0–2	0–4	0–3	1–2	0–5		0–4	0–4	0–3	0–2	1–3
Sandbach United	3–2	1–4	1–0	3–2	4–1	1–0	3–2	3–0	4–0	5–1	1–3	3–1	0–2	4–2	6–1		7–0	1–1	3–1	2–1
Stafford Town	2–1	1–2	3–2	2–5	2–0	2–4	1–2	1–5	2–5	1–1	1–1	1–0	2–3	2–4	4–3	1–2		0–2	0–4	1–4
Stockpt Georgians	2–1	3–3	1–1	2–1	1–0	1–3	3–0	1–1	0–2	1–2	0–3	3–0	1–0	0–2	4–1	2–2	4–1		0–2	0–0
Stockport Town	8–0	2–1	1–0	3–0	4–0	5–0	5–0	1–1	1–1	3–1	3–1	5–2	1–0	2–2	3–0	6–2	7–0	2–1		1–2
Wythenshawe Am	2–0	3–1	4–0	5–0	1–0	2–0	2–1	0–0	2–0	6–0	2–0	7–2	3–0	3–4	3–1	2–1	2–0	2–0	1–0	

Source: "First Division South Results 2022/23". nwcfl.com.
Legend: Blue = home team win; Yellow = draw; Red = away team win.

=== Promotion play-offs ===
The 2022–23 First Division South promotion play-offs, contested by the clubs that finished second to fifth position in the league table, were won by Cheadle Town who had been fifth-placed in the division.

Semi-finals
2	Stockport Town	0
5	Cheadle Town	2
3	Sandbach United	3
4	Brocton	1

Final
5	Cheadle Town	3
3	Sandbach United	1

Source="First Division South Play-Off Results 2022/23". nwcfl.com.

==== Semi-finals ====
22 April 2023	Sandbach United	3–1	Brocton	Sandbach
	West 18'; Fitzpatrick 71'; Cain 88'		Smith 56'	Stadium: Sandbach Community Football Centre; Attendance: 626

22 April 2023	Stockport Town	0–2	Cheadle Town	Woodley
			Usher 83'; Pilkington 90+7'	Stadium: Stockport Sports Village; Attendance: 355

==== Final ====
29 April 2023	Sandbach United	1–3	Cheadle Town	Sandbach
	Hatton 12'		Usher 14', 31'; Pilkington 90+7'	Stadium: Sandbach Community Football Centre; Attendance: 1,375

=== Stadia and locations ===
Locations of the 2022–23 North West Counties Football League First Division South teams in the North West
2021–22 First Division South: Location of clubs
Locations of 2022–23 North West Counties First Division South teams (Greater Manchester)

Team	Stadium
Abbey Hey	The Abbey Stadium, Gorton
Abbey Hulton United	Birches Head Road
Alsager Town	Wood Park Stadium
Ashville	Villa Park, Wallasey
Barnton	Townfield
Brocton	Silkmore Lane
Cammell Laird 1907	Kirklands, Birkenhead
Cheadle Heath Nomads	The Heath
Cheadle Town	Park Road Stadium
Eccleshall	Pershall Park
Foley Meir	Whitcombe Road
Ellesmere Rangers	Beech Grove
Maine Road	Brantingham Road, Chorlton
New Mills	Church Lane
Rocester	Hillsfield
Sandbach United	Sandbach Community Football Centre
Stafford Town	Evans Park
Stockport Georgians	Cromley Road
Stockport Town	Stockport Sports Village
Wythenshawe Amateurs	Hollyhedge Park

== League Challenge Cup ==
The 2022–23 League Challenge Cup (known for sponsorship reasons as the Macron Cup) was open to all 60 clubs from the Premier and First Divisions North and South (indicated in the results listings below by '(PD)', '(FDN)' and '(FDS)' respectively). The final, played at Chorley F.C., was won 4–3 on penalties after a 2–2 draw after 90 minutes by Premier Division Congleton Town who defeated First Division North Bacup Borough (who the previous week had won the First Division Trophy).

For the first two rounds clubs were drawn into four regional groups that all initially contained fifteen clubs. One club in each group received a bye to the second round: these were the cup holders Charnock Richard (in Group 1) and the three highest-ranked clubs in the 2021–22 Premier Division that didn't achieve promotion: Wythenshawe Town (Group 2), Northwich Victoria (Group 4) and Avro (Group 3).

=== First round ===
Tie	Home team (division)	Score	Away team (division)
Group One
1	Ashton Athletic (PD)	3–2	Longridge Town (PD)
2	Daisy Hill (FDN)	0–2	Euxton Villa (FDN)
3	Holker Old Boys (FDN)	1–1 (4–5 p)	Burscough (PD)
4	Atherton Laburnum Rovers (FDN)	1–2	Kendal Town (PD)
5	FC St Helens (FDN)	2–1	AFC Blackpool (FDN)
6	Cleator Moor Celtic (FDN)	1–3	Squires Gate (PD)
7	Garstang (FDN)	2–1	Ashton Town (FDN)
Group Two
8	AFC Liverpool (PD)	1–0	FC Isle of Man (PD)
9	Cammell Laird 1907 (FDS)	2–1	Ashville (FDS)
10	Vauxhall Motors (PD)	1–1 (1–4 p)	South Liverpool (FDN)
11	Litherland REMYCA (PD)	0–4	Lower Breck (PD)
12	Maine Road (FDS)	0–0 (4–5 p)	Wythenshawe Amateurs (FDS)
13	Pilkington (FDN)	3–0	West Didsbury & Chorlton (PD)
14	Irlam (PD)	4–0	Runcorn Town (FDN)
Group Three
15	Stockport Georgians (FDS)	1–0	Prestwich Heys (PD)
16	Ilkley Town (FDN)	0–1	Bacup Borough (FDN)
17	Darwen (FDN)	1–5	Steeton (FDN)
18	Barnoldswick Town (PD)	2–1	Stockport Town (FDS)
19	Abbey Hey (FDS)	1–1 (4–2 p)	Nelson (FDN)
20	New Mills (FDS)	6–1	Chadderton (FDN)
21	Bury AFC (PD)	3–1	Padiham (PD)
Group Four
22	Alsager Town (FDS)	1–4	Abbey Hulton United (FDS)
23	Eccleshall (FDS)	2–2 (4–2 p)	Cheadle Heath Nomads (FDS)
24	Foley Meir (FDS)	2–5	Brocton (FDS)
25	Cheadle Town (FDS)	6–1	Rocester (FDS)
26	Ellesmere Rangers (FDS)	1–2	Congleton Town (PD)
27	Winsford United (PD)	3–0	Sandbach United (FDS)
28	Stafford Town (FDS)	0–5	Barnton (FDS)

=== Second round ===
Tie	Home team (division)	Score	Away team (division)
Group One
1	Ashton Athletic (PD)	1–3	Euxton Villa (FDN)
2	Burscough (PD)	1–4	Kendal Town (PD)
3	Charnock Richard (PD)	2–2 (4–5 p)	FC St Helens (FDN)
4	Squires Gate (PD)	1–0	Garstang (FDN)
Group Two
5	Cammell Laird 1907 (FDS)	1–4	South Liverpool (FDN)
6	Lower Breck (PD)	4–0	Wythenshawe Amateurs (FDS)
7	Wythenshawe Town (PD)	5–1	AFC Liverpool (PD)
8	Pilkington (FDN)	1–1 (6–5 p)	Irlam (PD)
Group Three
9	Avro (PD)	0–0 (5–3 p)	Stockport Georgians (FDS)
10	Bacup Borough (FDN)	1–1 (4–3 p)	Steeton (FDN)
11	Barnoldswick Town (PD)	1–1 (6–5 p)	Abbey Hey (FDS)
12	New Mills (FDS)	0–0 (3–2 p)	Bury AFC (PD)
Group Four
13	Abbey Hulton United (FDS)	3–0	Eccleshall (FDS)
14	Barnton (FDS)	3–1	Winsford United (PD)
15	Brocton (FDS)	1–2	Congleton Town (PD)
16	Northwich Victoria (PD)	2–0	Cheadle Town (FDS)

=== Third round ===
The groupings from the previous rounds were discontinued.

Tie	Home team (division)	Score	Away team (division)
1	Bacup Borough (FDN)	W–x	Barnton (FDS)
1	Walkover for Bacup Borough owing to withdrawal of Barnton		
2	Barnoldswick Town (PD)	3–4	Northwich Victoria (PD)
3	FC St Helens (FDN)	4–0	Euxton Villa (FDN)
4	Lower Breck (PD)	0–1	Congleton Town (PD)
5	New Mills (FDS)	0–3	Kendal Town (PD)
6	Pilkington (FDN)	2–4	Avro (PD)
7	South Liverpool (FDN)	4–1	Abbey Hulton United (FDS)
8	Wythenshawe Town (PD)	1–3	Squires Gate (PD)

=== Quarter-finals ===
Tie	Home team (division)	Score	Away team (division)
1	Congleton Town (PD)	1–0	Northwich Victoria (PD)
2	FC St Helens (FDN)	2–0	Squires Gate (PD)
3	Kendal Town (PD)	2–2 (4–2 p)	Avro (PD)
4	South Liverpool (FDN)	2–4	Bacup Borough (FDN)

=== Semi-finals ===
Tie	Home team (division)	Score	Away team (division)
1	Bacup Borough (FDN)	1–1 (4–3 p)	FC St Helens (FDN)
2	Kendal Town (PD)	0–3	Congleton Town (PD)

=== Final ===
8 May 2023	Bacup Borough (FDN)	2–2 (3–4 p)	Congleton Town (PD)	Chorley
13:00 BST	Toby Wright 65', 90' (pen.)	Report	Thomas Pope 53'; Lewis Short 80' (pen.)	Stadium: Chorley F.C. (Victory Park); Attendance: 1033

source: "League Challenge Cup Results: 2022/23 Season". nwcfl.com.

== First Division Trophy ==
The 2022–23 First Division Trophy (known as the Edward Case Cup, the name of the trophy) was open to all 38 clubs from the First Divisions North and South. The final was played at Congleton Town F.C. where North division Bacup Borough defeated South division Ellesmere Rangers 2–0.

The two First Divisions comprised a total of 38 clubs (18 North and 20 South). Until the Quarter-finals the competition was organised in North and South sections (per the divisions). To reduce the clubs in each section to 16 for the first round six preliminary round ties were arranged – the 12 clubs included comprised the five clubs promoted to the divisions and the seven clubs (2 North and 5 South Division) with the lowest league positions from the 2021–22 season.

=== First Round ===
Tie	Home team	Score	Away team
North Group
1	Atherton Laburnum Rovers	2–4	Euxton Villa
2	FC St Helens	5–1	Darwen
South Group
3	Abbey Hulton United	1–1 (7–6 p)	Stockport Georgians
4	Ashville	1–2	Eccleshall
5	Ellesmere Rangers	0–0 (7–6 p)	Alsager Town
6	Rocester	1–2	Foley Meir

=== Second Round ===
Tie	Home team	Score	Away team
North Group
1	AFC Blackpool	1–1 (4–1 p)	FC St Helens
2	Ashton Town	2–0	Runcorn Town
3	Bacup Borough	3–2	Cleator Moor Celtic
4	Chadderton	2–0	Garstang
5	Daisy Hill	2–3	Pilkington
6	Ilkley Town	2–2 (1–4 p)	Euxton Villa
7	Nelson	3–1	Steeton
8	South Liverpool	1–1 (6–5 p)	Holker Old Boys
South Group
9	Cammell Laird 1907	1–2	Abbey Hey
10	Eccleshall	2–2 (4–3 p)	Cheadle Heath Nomads
11	Ellesmere Rangers	3–0	Stafford Town
12	Foley Meir	1–2	Abbey Hulton United
13	Maine Road	4–1	Barnton
14	Sandbach United	3–4	Cheadle Town
15	Stockport Town	2–0	Brocton
16	Wythenshawe Amateurs	0–0 (5–4 p)	New Mills

=== Third Round ===
Tie	Home team	Score	Away team
North Group
1	Bacup Borough	3–1	Nelson
2	Euxton Villa	0–0 (5–6 p)	Chadderton
3	Pilkington	4–2	Ashton Town
4	South Liverpool	2–2 (5–3 p)	AFC Blackpool
South Group
5	Abbey Hey	2–0	Eccleshall
5	Match moved to Abbey Hey following four postponements at Eccleshall		
6	Abbey Hulton United	2–1	Wythenshawe Amateurs
7	Cheadle Town	1–2	Ellesmere Rangers
8	Stockport Town	4–1	Maine Road

=== Quarter-finals ===
The separation of clubs into North and South groups was discontinued from this round. Clubs from North and South Divisions are indicated in the results listings below by '(N)' and '(S)' respectively.

Tie	Home team (division)	Score	Away team (division)
1	Bacup Borough (N)	2–2 (6–5 p)	Pilkington (N)
2	Chadderton (N)	4–1	Abbey Hey (S)
3	South Liverpool (N)	1–1 (3–4 p)	Abbey Hulton United (S)
4	Stockport Town (S)	1–3	Ellesmere Rangers (S)

=== Semi-finals ===
In both ties North and South division clubs opposed each other with one from each division winning, creating a North versus South division final.

Tie	Home team (division)	Score	Away team (division)
1	Bacup Borough (N)	4–0	Abbey Hulton United (S)
2	Chadderton (N)	0–3	Ellesmere Rangers (S)

=== Final ===
1 May 2023	Bacup Borough (N)	2–0	Ellesmere Rangers (S)	Congleton
13:00 BST	Michael Gervin 10'; Toby Wright 80' (pen.)	Report		Stadium: Congleton Town F.C. (Cleric Stadium, West Field); Attendance: 593

source: "Edward Case Cup Results: 2022/23 Season". nwcfl.com.

== First Division Champions Cup ==
The 2022–23 First Division Champions Cup was contested by the champions of the First Division North and First Division South. The fixture was played at the ground of the participant with the best record over the league season, the southern section champions Wythenshawe Amateurs, who won the cup.

22 April 2023	Wythenshawe Amateurs (S)	2–1	Pilkington (N)	Wythenshawe
15:00 BST	Saul Henderson 3'; Saul Henderson 71'		Callum Laird 10'	Stadium: Wythenshawe Amateurs F.C., Hollyhedge Park; Attendance: 289

source: "First Division Champions Cup Results: 2022/23 Season". nwcfl.com.
