= F.C. Isle of Man =

Football club based in Douglas, Isle of Man

- Full name: Football Club Isle of Man
- Nickname: The Ravens
- Founded: 2019; 7 years ago
- Ground: The Bowl , Douglas
- Capacity: 3,350
- Owner: Sporting Club Isle of Man
- Chairman: David Pope
- Manager: Lee Dixon
- League: North West Counties League Premier Division
- 2025–26: North West Counties League Premier Division, 20th of 24
- Website: fcisleofman.im
Home colours	Away colours	Third colours

Football Club Isle of Man is an amateur football club based in Douglas, Isle of Man, that competes in the North West Counties League Premier Division, the 9th tier of English football (Step 5). The club was founded in 2019 but did not play its first competitive match until 2021 due to the COVID-19 pandemic. F.C. Isle of Man plays their home games at The Bowl in Douglas and covers the costs of visiting clubs' and match officials' travel and hotel expenses for the games.

The club is not affiliated with the Isle of Man Government; it is owned by its parent company Sporting Club Isle of Man. The club is owned by the local community, funded by the sale of various memberships which offer exclusive benefits, including early and discounted access to match day and season ticket sales.

== History ==
In August 2019, F.C. Isle of Man confirmed their intentions to enter a team into the English football league system at step six of non-league. On 8 October 2019, the club announced it had become affiliated with the Isle of Man Football Association, following the backing of clubs in the Manx football system. However, there was opposition to the move from some local clubs and supporters over F.C. Isle of Man cherry-picking the best players from teams around the island and other clubs losing out on potential spectators. To ease this concern, F.C. Isle of Man kicks off its games at 18:30 to avoid any potential fixture clashes with the local league, which consists of 26 clubs, with 49 teams between them.

On 18 February 2020, St Georges manager Chris Bass was announced as the club's first manager. On 7 November 2022, following a run of mixed results, an announcement was made that the club and Bass had parted company with Director of Football Paul Jones taking over from Bass until the end of the season. The beginning of the 2025-26 season saw the club endure a poor start to the campaign, and it was announced on September 23, 2025, that Paul Jones had relinquished his managerial role at the club.

With Paul Jones having stepped down, on 24 September 2025, it was announced in a press release that Rick Holden had replaced Jones as manager on a 'caretaker basis' until the club could undertake the relevant procedure to appoint a permanent replacement.

On 21 February 2020, the North West Counties Football League confirmed F.C. Isle of Man had submitted an application to join the league in time for the 2020–21 season.

On 21 July 2020, it was announced that the club would participate in the North West Counties Football League First Division South. Due to the COVID-19 restrictions, the team withdrew from the 2020–21 FA Vase before their first qualifying round match. On 7 December, the club was temporarily suspended from the league as it had become apparent that they would not be able to complete all their fixtures by 31 May 2021, as required by The Football Association.

They won their inaugural match 1- 0 at their home ground, The Bowl, against Guernsey F.C. on 15 August 2020. Jack McVey scored a 33rd-minute penalty in front of an estimated 2,700 attendance. Following the success of the game, on 28 August 2020, Skipton International Managing Director Jim Coupe announced they had signed a 3-year agreement to sponsor an annual 'tournament' between the teams, for the Skipton International Cup.

The inaugural Cup match took place at Footes Lane, Guernsey on 12 September 2020 resulting in a 1–1 draw, Sean Doyle the Ravens scorer. The tie then went to penalties, with both team having one saved (Ravens keeper Dean Kearns saving Ross Allen's and Josh Addison saved Luke Murrays). Ultimately a miss by Sean Quaye saw the Green Lions lift the trophy.

On 23 July 2022, Sean Quaye made amends for his previous penalty miss as both he and Lee Gale scored in a 2–0 victory at the Bowl, in front of an estimated 500 attendance.

Wem Town advised the NWCFL that they were withdrawing from the league for season 2021/2022 which enabled F.C. Isle of Man to enter the NWCFL for the start of the 2021–22 NWCFL Division One South season. F.C. Isle of Man played their first competitive league match against Maine Road F.C. on 31 July 2021, with Frank Jones scoring the club's first competitive goal after 8 minutes. The match ended in a 1–1 draw. Their first season ended in success as despite a second-placed finish, a 4–2 victory over New Mills FC on 16 April 2022, saw the club promoted to the ninth tier of English football through the play-offs. The Ravens completed the season with a second piece of silverware, beating Cammell Laird 1–0 on 21 May 2022 to lift the First Division Edward Case Cup. The only goal of the game was from a Jacob Crook header in 79th minute, in front of 3,018 attendance.

During February 2023 the club began the process to find a permanent manager for the 2023-24 campaign. With Paul Jones still in his interim role the club were keen to ensure that should he wished, Jones would be able to apply for the job on a full-time basis.

On April 24, 2023, following the conclusion of the recruitment process, the club confirmed that Jones had been appointed to the post full-time with effect from that date. Following the resignation of Jones in September 2025, the club issued a statement to the effect that the appointment of a new manager would be announced in due course.

An announcement was made the following day, September 24, that Rick Holden would be acting a manager until the end of the 2025-2026 season following which a recruitment process to replace Jones on a fulltime basis would be undertaken.

On 18 June 2026, Lee Dixon was appointed as first-team manager, succeeding caretaker manager Rick Holden, ahead of the 2026/27 North West Counties Football League (NWCFL) Premier Division season.

== Colours and crest ==
F.C. Isle of Man play their home games in a red and black strip with the sponsors logo displayed in white, and their away games in either a blue and white, or green and blue kit.

In July 2020. Hope & Glory was announced as the club's kit manufacturer and the club asked supporters to vote via social media on three different kit options. After a 10-day voting period, option one was the favourite choice of the official supporters, garnering 55% of the vote.

On 27 February, F.C. Isle of Man unveiled their club crest, stating "In line with the philosophy of our parent company Sporting Club Isle of Man, the crest has been carefully crafted to not only reflect the essence of our Island's history, colours and community but also, importantly, to represent our confident sporting approach." Featuring a black raven in an attack posture, one of the island's national birds, synonymous to the Celts and Vikings with battle, intelligence and problem solving. The crest also includes red and white colours, which represent the island's sunsets and Manannán's cloak. The four water lines represent the four sides of the Island, symbolising unity and community.

The club's motto, "Bee ny Share" also features on the club's crest and sleeve of the shirt, which is Manx for "Be Better".

The crest did not include the triskelion of the Island's national flag and coat of arms. In an interview published on the website of the North West Counties Football League, then sporting director Paul Jones stated, "We also decided early on not to use the 3 legs of man. This was to ensure we differentiated ourselves from the National teams. The 3 legs is subtly included in our kit but we felt being on the badge could send the wrong message. We needed to make sure we promote ourselves as a club not a national team."

== Kit suppliers and shirt sponsors ==
Prior to the commencement of its first season the club signed a three-year sponsorship deal with Manx Telecom, a local telecoms provider, part of which saw Manx Telecom's IT infrastructure and managed services subsidiary Synapse 360 appearing on the away shirts. On 30 July 2020, F.C. Isle of Man announced a three-year deal with Rex Motor Company to become the team's first sleeve sponsor. On 23 May 2022 it was announced that the club would sport a third kit for the 2022–23 season, which would be sponsored by OV powered by Manx Telecom and include Rex Motor Company on the sleeve The sponsorship deal with Manx Telecom terminated at the end of the 2023-24 season following which a new sponsor for the Home Strip, FRP, was unveiled.

Season	Kit manufacturer	Shirt sponsor (chest)	Shirt sponsor (sleeve)	Shirt sponsor (back)
2020–21	Hope & Glory	Home: Manx Telecom Away: Synapse 360	Home: Rex Motor Company Away: Rex Motor Company	
2021–22	Hope & Glory	Home: Manx Telecom Away: Synapse 360	Home: Rex Motor Company Away: Rex Motor Company	
2022-23	Hope & Glory	Home: Manx Telecom Away: Synapse 360 Third: OV powered by Manx Telecom	Home: Rex Motor Company Away: Rex Motor Company Third: Rex Motor Company	
2023-24	Hope & Glory	Home: Manx Telecom Away: Synapse 360/IOMSPC Third: OV Powered by Manx Telecom	Home: Newfield Away: Rex Motor Company Third: Rex Motor Company	
2024-25	Hope & Glory	Home: FRP Away: Isle of Man Steam Packet Holidays Third: Peel Holdings	Home: Newfield Away: Newfield Third: Newfield	
2025-26	Hope & Glory	Home: FRP Away: Isle of Man Steam Packet Holidays Third: Peel Holdings	Home: Newfield Away: Newfield Third: Newfield	
2026-27	Hope & Glory	Home: FRP Away: Isle of Man Steam Packet Holidays Third: Peel Holdings	Home: Newfield Away: Newfield Third: Newfield	Home: DotPerformance

== Supporters ==
The club is well supported on its island home, frequently pulling in crowds that are larger than the league average for steps 5 and 6. In their first season in the North West Counties First Division South they recorded an average home attendance of 1,612, which compared favourably to the league average for the season of 214. In the 2022–23 season the average attendance fell to 758 compared to the league average of 281. Home attendance improved in the 2023-24 season, averaging 882.

At the beginning of the 2022–23 season supporters of the club started to be referred to as "The Conspiracy", in reference to one of the collective nouns for a group of Ravens. The first record of the terms usage was in a supporter's pre-season report on the supporters group's Facebook page on 23 July 2023, but the term was adopted by more mainstream media outlets in their reporting later in the season.

== Mascot ==
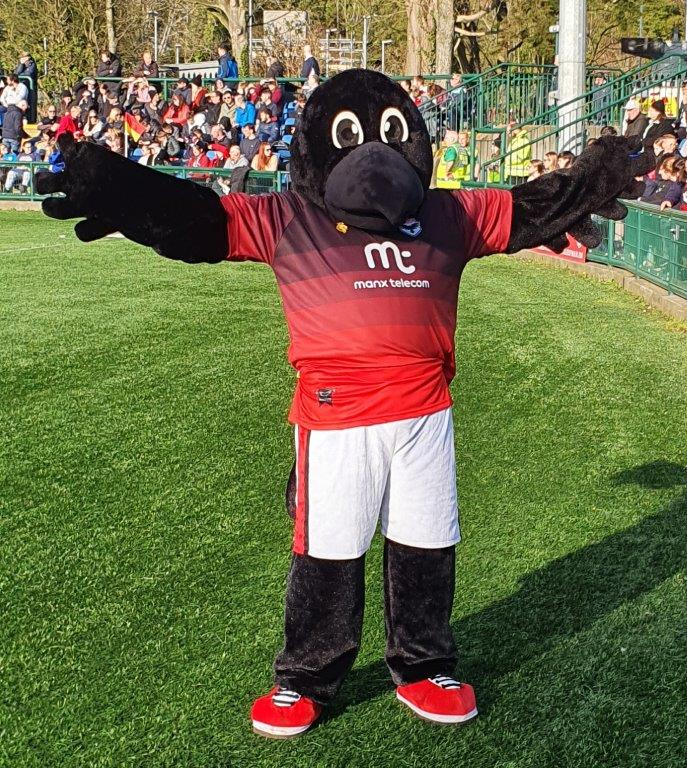
Raymond Raven at the Bernabowl, Douglas, Isle of Man

The official mascot of F.C. Isle of Man is a generic bear, which is of uncertain origin and is trotted out at various sporting events around the Island. For a team nicknamed the Ravens, a group of supporters deemed a bear to be a wholly inappropriate mascot and thus the unofficial mascot, Raymond Raven was born. Attending every home game, and even travelling away to AFC Darwen on 2 May 2022, and to Kendal Town on 4 February 2023 and again on 20 January 2024, Raymond has become a firm fan favourite, and is widely considered to be the most known mascot in Manx sport.

== Stadium ==
The club play at The Bowl in Douglas, a 3,500-seater stadium nicknamed "The Bernabowl" in reference to the Santiago Bernabéu Stadium in Madrid. The Bowl has been the club's home ground since July 2020.

== Players ==
=== First-team squad ===
As of 23 August 2024

Note: Flags indicate national team as defined under FIFA eligibility rules; some limited exceptions apply. Players may hold more than one non-FIFA nationality.

No.	Pos.	Nation	Player
1	GK	Isle of Man	Adam Killey
-	GK	Isle of Man	Thomas Crosbie
-	DF	Isle of Man	Josh Cain
4	DF	Isle of Man	Karl Clark
-	DF	Isle of Man	Preston Cleator
3	DF	Isle of Man	Jacob Crook
-	DF	Isle of Man	Charlie Gibson
-	DF	Isle of Man	Jack Higgins
5	DF	Isle of Man	Alex Maitland
2	DF	Isle of Man	Callum Sherry
-	MF	Isle of Man	Dylan Bullock

No.	Pos.	Nation	Player
-	MF	Isle of Man	Danny Gerrard
-	MF	Isle of Man	Freddie O'Donoghue
10	MF	Isle of Man	Dean Pinnington
8	MF	Isle of Man	Joe Quayle (Captain)
6	MF	Isle of Man	Kyle Watson (Vice-Captain)
7	MF	Isle of Man	Ste Whitley
9	FW	Isle of Man	Adam Adebiyi
-	FW	Isle of Man	Tomas Brown
-	FW	Isle of Man	Jason Charmer
-	FW	Isle of Man	Will Cowin
11	FW	Isle of Man	Charlie Higgins

=== Club captains ===
Frank Jones was announced as the first Captain of F.C. Isle of Man. He was sidelined with an injury sustained during the first league match against Maine Road F.C. (in which he scored the opening goal) after which Jack McVey and Chris Bass Jr were called upon to share the captaincy for the rest of the season. Top goalscorer Sean Doyle was chosen as captain in 2022, but in a carbon copy of the previous season, suffered an injury in the first league game against Lower Breck F.C. Team captaincy was initially shared between Sean Quaye, Chris Bass Jr and Jack McVey, before Steve Whitley took over the armband for 20 games. Before the season ended, both Sean Doyle and Frank Jones returned from injury and took over captaincy.

Name	Period
Frank Jones	2020–2021
Jack McVey/ Chris Bass Jr.	2021–2022
Jack McVey/ Chris Bass Jr./Sean Quaye	2022
Steve Whitley	2022-2023
Sean Doyle	2022–2025
Michael Williams	2025-2026
Joe Quayle	2026-

== Officials ==
=== Current coaching staff ===
Position	Name
Manager	Lee Dixon
Assistant Manager	Liam Cowin
Coach	Gavin Gawne
Physiotherapist	Alex Johnston
First Aider	Rick Holden
Welfare Officer	Gareth Lloyd
Helmet	Dave Cherry

Managerial statistics (League, Play Offs & Various Cup Competitions, but excluding Friendlies), as at 6 March 2024. Paul Jones was unavailable for the home game against West Didsbury & Chorlton on 25 March 2023, and the away game against Wythenshawe Town on 2 September 2023. Former F.C. Isle of Man player, Alex Harrison was temporary manager for the home game which ended 2-2, and coach Gareth Lloyd was temporary manager for the away game which was drawn 0-0. Both results are included in Paul Jones' figures below.

A further anomaly in Paul Jones figures below is the away game at A.F.C. Liverpool on 23 September 2023 which was halted (and subsequently ended) in the 72nd minute do to a serious injury to opposition goalkeeper, Harry Deveney. The score at the time was 4-4, which was later agreed as the final score.

Manager	From	To	P	W	D	L	W%	Reference
Chris Bass	18 February 2020	7 November 2022	71	42	11	18	59.2	
Paul Jones (Interim)	8 November 2022	23 April 2023	25	11	2	12	44.0	
Paul Jones	24 April 2023	23 September 2025	92	39	16	37	42.3	
Rick Holden	24 September 2025	18 April 2026	33	10	6	17	30.3	
Lee Dixon	18 June 2026	present						

== Honours ==
=== League ===
North West Counties League Division One South (Level 10, Step 6)

- Play-off winners : 2021–22

=== Cup ===
North West Counties Division One Challenge (Edward Case) Cup

- Winners in 2021-22 (1–0)

Skipton Cup

- 2nd in 2020–21 (1-1 P5-4)
- Winners in 2022-23 (2–0)

=== League awards ===
North West Counties League Division One South club of the month award

- September 2021

== Records ==
- Highest victory: 10–2, against St Martins F.C. (2 November 2021)
- Home attendance: 3,230, against New Mills A.F.C. (16 April 2022)
- Goals (total): 59, by Sean Doyle (up to 13 January 2024)
- Goals (season): 41, by Sean Doyle (2021–22)

== Ownership and finances ==
F.C. Isle of Man is owned by parent company Sporting Club Isle of Man, a club owned by the local community, through purchasing various memberships.
