= Wythenshawe F.C. =

Association football club in Greater Manchester, England

Coordinates: 53.392830°N 2.246677°W

Wythenshawe
- Full name: Wythenshawe Football Club
- Nickname: The Ammies
- Founded: 1946
- Ground: Hollyhedge Park, Wythenshawe
- Capacity: 1,500
- Chairman: Carl Barrett
- Manager: James Kinsey
- League: Northern Premier League Division One West
- 2025–26: North West Counties League Premier Division, 1st of 24 (promoted)
Home colours	Away colours

Wythenshawe Football Club is a football club based in Wythenshawe, Manchester, England. They are currently members of the Northern Premier League Division One West and play at Hollyhedge Park.

== History ==
The club was established in 1946 by Reg Gauntlet under the name Wythenshawe Lads Club, and joined the Manchester Federation of Lads' Clubs League. In 1949 the players had become too old for the league, resulting in the club forming an adult side that entered the South Manchester and Wythenshawe League, with the club's name changed to Wythenshawe Amateurs. After several promotions, they were Division One champions in 1952–53. The club then joined the Altrincham & District League, in which they played for a single season before switching to Division 3A of the Lancashire & Cheshire League.

Wythenshawe's first season in the Lancashire & Cheshire League saw them win the Hellawell Shield and the Division 3A title, resulting in promotion to Division Three. The following season saw the club finish second in Division Three and earn promotion to Division Two, as well as reaching the final of the Altrincham FA's Whitaker Cup, holding Manchester United to a 1–1 draw after extra time, resulting in the cup being shared. In 1956–57 the club secured a third successive promotion after winning the Division Two title. After becoming members of Division One, the club won the league's Rhodes Cup in 1957–58 and 1960–61, before becoming Division One champions in 1961–62.

Wythenshawe won the Rhodes Cup again in 1971–72, after which they moved up to Division One of the Manchester League. The club were Division One champions at the first attempt, earning promotion to the Premier Division. In 1975–76 they won the Lancashire Amateur Cup. The club were Premier Division runners-up in 1979–80 and 1984–85, and won the Gilgryst Cup in 1985–86 and 1986–87. The 1989–90 season saw the club win a treble, finishing as Premier Division champions and winning both the Lancashire Amateur Cup and the Gilgryst Cup.

Wythenshawe were Premier Division runners-up in 1991–92, before winning the league again in 1992–93 and finishing as runners-up the following season. They won the Lancashire Amateur Cup again in 1995–96, and the Gilgryst cup in 1998–99, 2000–01 and 2008–09. In the league, they finished as runners-up six times between 2000 and 2017. After finishing as runners-up and winning the Gilgryst Cup again in 2017–18, the club were accepted into Division One South of the North West Counties League. In 2022–23 they were Division One South champions, earning promotion to the Premier Division. They also won the Division One Champions Cup, beating Division One North champions Pilkington 2–1.

In July 2023 the club dropped "Amateurs" from their name, becoming Wythenshawe Football Club. They went on to win the Premier Division title in 2023–24, beating rivals Wythenshawe Town to the title on the final day of the season, securing a second successive promotion, this time to Division One West of the Northern Premier League. However, the following season saw the club finish third-from-bottom of Division One West, resulting in relegation back to the Premier Division of the North West Counties League. They won the Premier Division in 2025–26 to make an immediate return to Division One West of the Northern Premier League.

== Ground ==
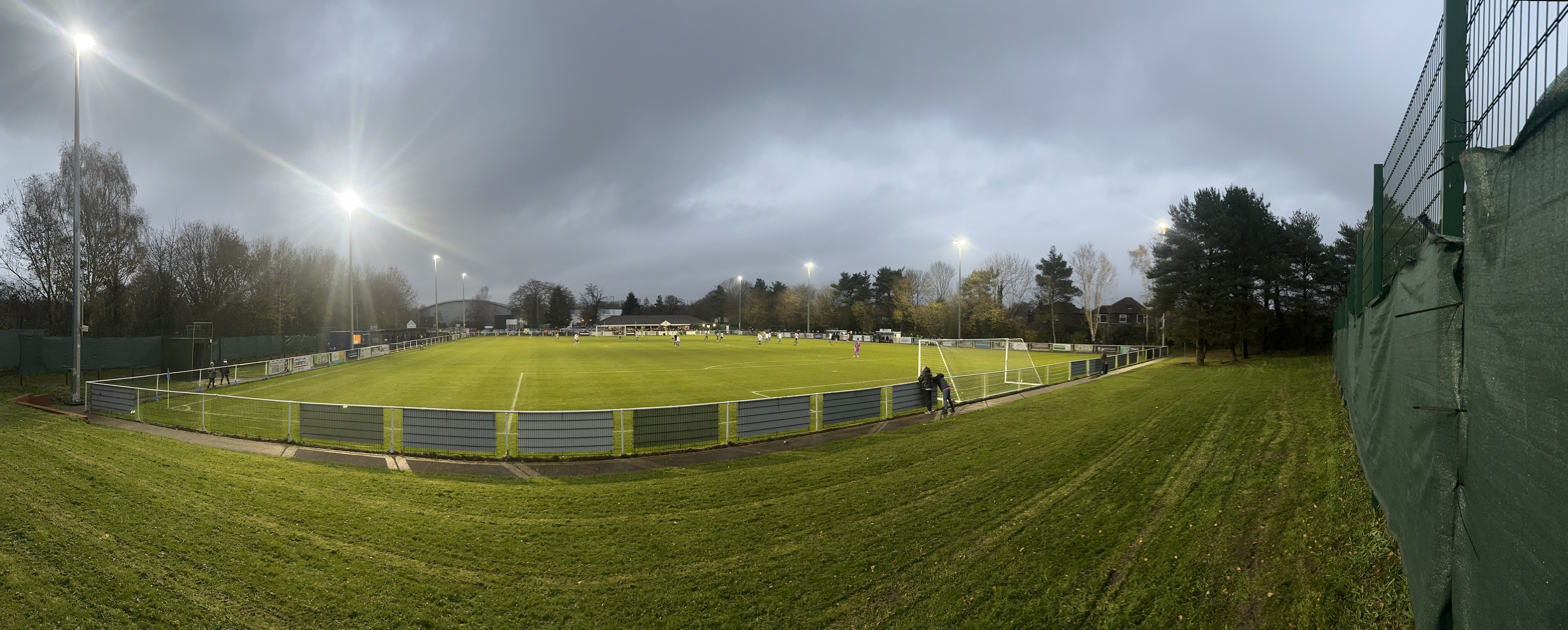
Hollyhedge Park

The club initially played at the Cleveland Playing Fields, before moving to Wythenshawe Park in 1949. In 1958 they relocated to the Christie Playing Fields, where they played until moving to the Federation of Lads' Clubs Ground in nearby Chorlton in 1961. This was later renamed the Harry Dalton playing fields (Dalton having been in charge of the club when they became an adult side). In 1983 they relocated to Wythenshawe Cricket Club's Longley Lane ground. After several years of fundraising, the club built a new ground, Hollyhedge Park, which opened on 30 September 2017 with a 1–1 draw against Hindsford.

== Honours ==
- North West Counties League
  - Premier Division champions 2023–24, 2025–26
  - Division One South champions 2022–23
  - Champions Cup winners 2023–24, 2025–26
  - Division One South Champions Cup winners 2022–23
- Manchester League
  - Premier Division champions 1989–90, 1992–93
  - Division One champions 1972–73
  - Gilgryst Cup winners 1985–86, 1986–87, 1989–90, 1998–99, 2000–01, 2008–09, 2017–18
  - Norman Noden Memorial Invitation Cup winners 2008–09
- Lancashire & Cheshire League
  - Division One champions 1961–62
  - Division Two champions 1956–57
  - Division 3A champions 1954–55
  - Rhodes Cup winners 1957–58, 1960–61, 1971–72
  - Hellawell Shield winners 1954–55
- South Manchester and Wythenshawe League
  - Division One champions 1952–53
- Whitaker Cup
  - Winners 1955–56 (joint)

== Records ==
- Best FA Cup performance: First qualifying round, 2025–26
- Best FA Amateur Cup performance: Third qualifying round, 1972–73
- Best FA Vase performance: Fifth round, 1984–85
- Record attendance: 1,450 vs Wythenshawe Town, North West Counties League Premier Division, 26 December 2023
- Biggest win: 11–1 vs City of Liverpool, North West Counties League Premier Division, 22 November 2025
- Heaviest defeat: 6–0 vs Avro, Manchester League Premier Division, 25 February 2012; 6–0 vs Ashton Athletic, North West Counties League Cup, 7 December 2019

== See also ==
- Wythenshawe Amateurs F.C. players
