= The Bowl (Douglas) =

Stadium in Douglas, Isle of Man

Coordinates: 54°09′06″N 4°30′06″W

- The Bernabowl
- Interactive map of The Bowl
- Location: Pulrose Road, Douglas, Isle of Man
- Owner: Isle of Man Government
- Operator: MSR
- Capacity: 3,350
- Surface: Lano Sports Rugby MXSi20 65 IS 25 synthetic pitch

Tenants
- St Marys A.F.C. F.C. Isle of Man; Isle of Man official football team Ellan Vannin football team

Website
- msr.gov.im

The King George V Bowl (commonly known as The Bowl) is a multi-use stadium in Douglas, Isle of Man, and the home of F.C. Isle of Man. With a capacity of 3,350, a third of which are under cover, and a viewing platform for disabled users, it is the largest stadium on the Island. The Bowl also serves as the home of the Isle of Man Football Association, Isle of Man official football team and Ellan Vannin football team.

The highest attendance (3,327 spectators) was registered in the F.A. Inter League Cup Final on 28.04.12 against Jersey.

Nicknamed "The Bernabowl" by local supporters in reference to the Santiago Bernabéu Stadium, The Bowl has been the home ground of F.C. Isle of Man since July 2020, the club shares the ground with nine local clubs for their winter training schedule and St Marys A.F.C. have taken up permanent residence, training and playing their league matches at the stadium.

The Bowl was redeveloped at a cost of around £3.3 million, with then-Minister for Infrastructure David Cretney saying: "This is an exceptional facility at the heart of our Island of Sport. The previous, out of date Bowl has been transformed into a flagship sporting venue that will enable upcoming sports men and women to challenge the best visiting and local players."

The pitch is a 65 mm (2.6 in) rubber infill 3G carpet system, the same as currently used at Manchester United's Trafford Training Centre. It is approved by the RFU and FIFA for rugby and football. There are also four 500 lux floodlights on 18-metre (59 ft) columns in each corner of the stadium.

The Bowl is owned by the Isle of Man Government.

== History ==
=== Redevelopment ===
In April 2008, Douglas Borough Council confirmed that they were looking to redevelop The Bowl, and that it could become a national stadium for the Isle of Man. The scheme consisted of pitch improvements and better spectator facilities the deadline for the improvements were the 2011 Commonwealth Youth Games which were staged on the island. Capacity at the stadium was increased to 8,000, including 4,000 temporary seats in a covered section, as well as the installation of a giant screen. The developments enabled the stadium to be used for different sports as well as staging concerts and to be used as a community facility complementing the nearby National Sports Centre (NSC), which is owned and run by the Department of Tourism and Leisure of the Isle of Man Government. The council submitted a report to the Isle of Man Government's Tourism and Leisure Minister and the Council of Ministers of the Isle of Man to seek their support and in partnership with organisations such as the Isle of Man Football Association and the Isle of Man Sports Council. In addition support was also gained from the private sector.

The Council spokesman said, "The Bowl has not had any major investment for a number of years. It will become a national stadium, a national facility but in Corporation ownership. It's an exciting project and we think it's the right place for a national stadium, which will complement the NSC." The Isle of Man Sports Council has pledged to cover the cost of new floodlights at the stadium.

However, after it was announced in August 2008, that building tests were to be made to find out whether the stadium is suitable to convert into a larger venue with bore holes sunk at the venue to check ground conditions David Cretney the Member of the House of Keys (MHK) for Douglas South and current Minister of Trade and Industry raised concerns over the cost to ratepayers of drilling boreholes to test whether the ground was suitable for the stadium scheme, although he did confirm that he supported the scheme.

The engineering aspects of the project included stabilisation and remediation of made ground, design of piled foundations and reinforced concrete substructure, design of precast terrace units, super-structure design, a review of the fabric canopy design, barrier design, and sub base and drainage to the artificial pitch.

== F.C. Isle of Man ==
The Bowl is the home of F.C. Isle of Man, a club that plays in the North West Counties Football League Premier division, part of the English football league system. The Ravens played their first league game at the bowl against Brocton F.C. coming from behind to win 2-1 in front of 2,012 supporters.

== Other uses ==
=== Football ===
The stadium hosts the Isle of Man Football League's annual cup competitions finals such as the Manx FA Cup, the Charity Shield, Hospital Cup and the Railway Cup, as well as the Isle of Man Tournament, an annual four team football competition between the amateur FA teams of the Republic of Ireland, Northern Ireland, Scotland and the Isle of Man. The now defunct annual Isle of Man Steam Packet Football Festival was also held at The Bowl.

The Bowl is also home to St Marys A.F.C., who play in the Isle of Man Football League. They play their home matches at The Bowl but their changing rooms for home matches are at the nearby National Sports Centre.

=== Commonwealth Youth Games ===
The stadium was one of the venues for the 2011 Commonwealth Youth Games which was staged on the Isle of Man. It staged the rugby sevens and the opening ceremony.

=== Rugby league ===
Douglas Rugby club hold their winter training sessions and the Sports Development Unit use the Bowl for their all day schemes.

The Bowl was the most regularly used venue for the Rugby League Charity Shield (Great Britain), which was a trophy for British rugby league clubs that was held as a one-off match at the beginning of a new season. The stadium hosted the contest on four occasions in the 1980s.

=== Concerts and other functions ===
The Bowl has also staged pop concerts such as Meatloaf. A Toyah Willcox concert held at the venue in front of an audience of 4,000 on 11 June 2002 as part of her "Here and Now 2002" Tour and Status Quo who played there in the early 1990s.

Ballakermeen High School currently use the bowl to run 12 PE lessons a week.

== Transport ==
The Bowl is well serviced by bus with several stops along Peel road. The Bowl is approximately a 20 minute walk from the sea ferry terminal in Douglas. Parking is available at the Bowl and also nearby at the NSC and along Peel road in a small car park near the Douglas fire station.
