= Garstang F.C. =

Association football club in England

Coordinates: 53.903152°N 2.771170°W

Garstang
- Full name: Garstang Football Club
- Founded: 1885
- Ground: The Riverside, Garstang
- Chairman: Adrian Wilding
- Manager: Guy Heffernan
- League: North West Counties League Division One North
- 2025–26: North West Counties League Division One North, 17th of 18
- Website: garstangfc.co.uk
Home colours

Garstang Football Club is a football club based in Garstang, Lancashire, England. They are currently members of the North West Counties League Division One North and play at the Riverside.

== History ==
The club was established in 1885. They became members of the Preston & District League and won the league's Guildhall Cup in 1927. The club remained members of the league until 1994, when they moved up to Division Two of the West Lancashire League. Division Two was renamed Division One in 1998. In 1999–2000 the club won the Lancashire Amateur Shield, beating Stand Athletic in the final. They also won the West Lancashire League's President Cup and finished second in Division One, earning promotion to the Premier Division.

Garstang finished bottom of the Premier Division in 2001–02 and were relegated back to Division One. In 2006–07 they were Division One runners-up and were promoted to the Premier Division. The following season saw them win the Premier Division title for the first time. The club finished bottom of the Premier Division again in 2011–12, resulting in another relegation, but were Division One runners-up the following season, securing an immediate promotion back to the Premier Division.

In 2017–18 Garstang won the league's Richardson Cup and were Premier Division champions the second time, resulting in promotion to Division One North of the North West Counties League. They finished second-from-bottom of Division One North in 2024–25 but were reprieved from relegation.

== Ground ==
The club played at the Beeches until the mid-1960s, when they moved to the Riverside, a ground located next to the River Wyre. A small stand was built behind the dugouts, but was removed in 2006 due to vandalism.

== Honours ==
- West Lancashire League
  - Premier Division champions 2007–08, 2017–18
  - Richardson Cup winners 2017–18
  - Presidents Cup winners 1999–2000
- Lancashire Amateur Shield
  - Winners 1999–2000
- Preston & District League
  - Guildhall Cup winners 1926–27

== Records ==
- Best FA Vase performance: Second round, 2018–19
- Record attendance: 552 vs Bury AFC, North West Counties League Division One North, 18 September 2021

== See also ==
- Garstang F.C. managers
