= Longridge Town F.C. =

Association football club in England

Coordinates: 53.837265°N 2.610409°W

- Full name: Longridge Town Football Club
- Nickname: The Ridge
- Founded: 1996 (30 years ago)
- Ground: Inglewhite Road
- Chairman: Kevin Harrison
- Manager: Lee Ashcroft
- League: North West Counties League Premier Division
- 2024–25: North West Counties League Premier Division, 18th of 24
- Website: https://www.longridgetownfc.com/
Home colours	Third colours

Longridge Town Football Club is a football club based in Longridge, Lancashire, England. Nicknamed the Ridge, they are currently members of the North West Counties League Premier Division and play at The Inglewhite Road.

== History ==
Longridge Town hosting Blackpool in a pre-season friendly on 28 July 2019

The club was established in 1996 by a merger of Longridge St Wilfrid's and Longridge United. They started in the Preston & District League and were Centenary Guildhall Cup winners in season 2004–05. Promotions saw the club reach the Premier Division, and a second-place finish in 2005–06 led to them joining Division Two of the West Lancashire League in 2008. They finished as runners-up in their first season in the division, earning promotion to Division One. The 2011–12 season saw the club win the Division One title, resulting in promotion to the Premier Division. In 2016–17 they were Premier Division champions. Following a third-place finish the following season, the club moved up to Division One North of the North West Counties League (NWCFL). The club's first season in Division One North of the NWCFL saw them go on to win the league on the last day of the season ahead of Avro F.C. With becoming league champions, the club was promoted to the NWCL Premier Division at the first attempt, as Jay Hart finished the season with thirty goals.

== Staff ==
Position	Name
Manager	(England) Lee Ashcroft
Assistant manager	(England) Charlie Russell

== Honours ==
- North West Counties Division One North
  - Division One North champions 2018–19
- West Lancashire League
  - Wilf Carr Trophy 2017–18
  - Premier Division champions 2017–18
  - Division One champions 2011–12
- Preston & District League
  - Centenary Guildhall Cup winners 2004–05
  - Premier Division runners up 2004–05
  - Division Three champions 2003–04
  - William Shakespeare Memorial Trophy winners 1999-2000
