= Lower Breck F.C. =

Association football club in England

Coordinates: 53.427365°N 2.943568°W

Lower Breck
- Full name: Lower Breck Football Club
- Founded: 2010
- Ground: Anfield Sports and Community Centre, Anfield, Liverpool
- Manager: Gary Moore
- League: Northern Premier League Division One West
- 2025–26: Northern Premier League Division One West, 5th of 22
Home colours	Away colours

Lower Breck Football Club is an association football club based in Anfield, Liverpool, England. They are currently members of the Northern Premier League Division One West and play at the Anfield Sports and Community Centre. The team was founded in the summer of 2010.

== History ==
Lower Breck Football Club was established in the summer of 2010. In 2013–14, they won promotion from the Liverpool County Premier League Division One to the Premier Division. In 2018–19, they joined the North West Counties Football League. That same season, they got promotion to the North West Counties North Division, and then they got promoted to the North West Counties Premier Division two seasons later. In the 2024–25 season, they got promoted to the Northern Premier League Division One West after beating Padiham 2–0 in the play-off final.

== Current squad ==
As of 25 August 2026

Note: Flags indicate national team as defined under FIFA eligibility rules; some limited exceptions apply. Players may hold more than one non-FIFA nationality.

No.	Pos.	Nation	Player
—	GK	ENG	Alex Brown (on loan from Chester)
—	DF	ENG	Jay Cooper
—	DF	ENG	Jack Hont
—	DF	ENG	Will Lawson
—	DF	ENG	Liam Morris
—	DF	ENG	Danny McKenna
—	DF	ENG	Teddy Woolland
—	MF	ENG	Sam Burns

No.	Pos.	Nation	Player
—	MF	ENG	Bohan Dixon
—	MF	ENG	Billy Edmondson
—	MF	ENG	Jak McCourt
—	MF	ENG	Connor Millington
—	MF	ENG	Lucas Wilson
—	FW	ZIM	Alex Cherera
—	FW	ENG	Luke Gill
—	FW	ENG	Elliot Hughes
