= St Martins F.C. =

Association football club in England

Coordinates: 52.8759°N 3.0264°W

St Martins
- Full name: St Martins Football Club
- Nickname: The Saints
- Founded: 1897 (reformed 1945)
- Ground: St Martin's Playing Fields, St Martin's
- Chairman: Daryl Davies
- Manager: Daryl Davies
- League: Shropshire County League Division One
- 2024–25: Shropshire County League Division One, 11th of 16

St Martins Football Club is a football club based in the village of St Martin's, Shropshire, England. They are currently members of the Shropshire County League Division One and play at the St Martin's Playing Fields.

== History ==
The club was established in the 19th century and were playing in the Oswestry & District League by 1897. They were league champions in 1919–20 and won the Village Cup in 1930–31. The club was renamed St Martins United in the early 1930s, before becoming Greyhound Rangers in 1935 when playing at a field next to the Greyhound Inn pub. They moved across the border and joined the Cefn & District League. However, despite winning the League Cup in 1936–37, the club did not play again until 1939.

After World War II, St Martins joined the Oswestry & District League and won the league without losing a match in 1945–46. They were champions again in 1952–53 and 1954–55. They joined the Whitchurch League in 1955, where they played until it folded in 1972, after which they transferred to Division Three of the West Shropshire League in 1973. They won the Division Three title at the first attempt, also winning the League Cup by beating Premier Division Hanwood United 5–1 in the final. After two more successive promotions, the club reached the Premier Division in 1976. Under the management of Andrew Roberts, St Martins FC went through a very successful period, firstly winning the West Shropshire Alliance Premier Division in 1989–90, gaining promotion to the Shropshire County League. Saints won the Syd Roberts, Reg Lawrence and Graham Edwards Memorial Trophies often defeating teams from higher leagues. Saints did reach the League Cup final at Shrewsbury Town F.C.'s Gay Meadow, sadly losing out 1–0 to Belle Vue. Saints only waited a year to return to the Gay Meadow, this time to lift the Shropshire Junior Cup defeating Bishops Castle through a 3–1 victory.

St Martins gained huge success in cup competitions, but they also progressed in the top half of the league table year on year. Saints eventually did win the Shropshire County League Division One in 1997–98, earning promotion to the Premier League. Saints also added another Graham Edwards Trophy, but following the resignation of Andrew Roberts, the club found it hard to cope in Shropshire's top division. Saints, under the guidance of Derek Stokes dropped down in the Shropshire Alliance League to rebuild. This proved to be masterstroke as the club was able to bring a group of young players through that would serve the club well in years to come. Wayne Ryan took charge at the start of the 1999–2000 season. Saints won the Premier Division and League Cup double in his first season, but as a club they decided to stay in the same league. Saints won another league cup and they also finished Runners Up in the league, before Ryan stepped down as Manager due to increased work commitments. Mike Hughes took charge of Saints leading them to Runners Up position in the League earning promotion back to the Shropshire County League, but Hughes unexpectedly resigned one week before the new season. Benji Evans stepped in to steady the ship, Saints earned respectable league campaigns with top half finishes over a two-year period. Evans was entering his latter years at University, so he decided to move aside to enable Craig Rogers to take over the first team, while Evans set up a reserve team. This partnership was a successfully recipe with Evans developing youth players and Rogers was able to build a first team that could mount a genuine push for promotion. Saints won the Division One title, earning a respectable sixth-place finish in the Premier Division in the club's first season back in Shropshire's top division. Rogers left Saints to take over at Shawbury United, so John Smout was appointed. Smout continued the club's development, leading them to the Premier Division title in 2009–10 and the club were promoted to Division Two of the West Midlands (Regional) League. During this period, Saints moved to Park Hall Stadium in order to meet the league requirements of the West Midlands Regional League. Saints earned a fifth-place finish in 2011–12 was sufficient to earn promotion to Division One. In 2017–18 the club entered the FA Vase for the first time. St Martins finished in 4th position in Div 1, following a 21-game unbeaten run. During this successful spell under manager Dan Stevens, Saints lifted the Div 1 League Cup to earn their first silverware in the West Midlands Regional League. St Martins FC progressed to step 6 football after being accepted into the North West Counties Division One South for the 2018–19 season, joining other local teams Oswestry Town and Ellesmere Rangers in making the move to North West Football. The 2021–22 season however saw the team finish bottom of the table and relegated. In 2022/2023 Liam Braisdell formally took the reins as First-Team Manager and the majority of the reserve team were retained for a new season at Step 7.

== Honours ==
- West Midlands Regional League
  - Division 1 League Cup Champions 2017–18
- Shropshire County League
  - Div 1 Champions 1996–97, 2007–08
  - Premier Div Champions 2009–10
  - League Cup Champions 1993–94, 2014–15 (Reserves)
  - League Cup Runners Up 1991–92
- Shropshire Junior Cup

Champions 1992–93

- Graham Edwards Memorial Trophy
- Champions 1997, 2016 & 2018
- Runners-Up 2022
- Oswestry & District League
  - Champions 1919–20, 1945–46, 1952–53, 1954–55
- Cefn & District League
  - League Cup winners 1936–37
- West Shropshire Alliance League
  - Premier Division Champions 1989–90, 2000–01
  - Premier Division Runners Up 2001–02, 2005–06
  - Division Three Champions 1973–74
  - League Cup Champions 1973–74, 2000–01, 2001–02
  - Consolation Cup 1989–90, 2005–06
  - John Davies Memorial Cup Winners 2000–01
