= List of football clubs in Merseyside =

This is a list of football teams based in Merseyside sorted by which league they play in as of the 2023–24 season. The leagues are listed in order of their level in the English football league system.

Locations of all the football clubs in Merseyside from levels 1–10.

== Levels 1–4 ==
These Merseyside clubs play in fully professional leagues, comprising levels 1–4 of the English football league system: the Premier League and the Football League. Following the relegation of Tranmere in 2015, Everton and Liverpool became the only two remaining Merseyside teams in professional leagues. Matches between them are known as the Merseyside derby. However, Tranmere Rovers returned to the Football League after three seasons away, thanks to a 2-1 victory in the 2018 National League play-off final against Boreham Wood at Wembley. The 2018/19 season saw them advance through the League Two playoffs, and reach League One. The club were relegated to League Two in the 2019/20 season on a points per game basis due to the COVID-19 pandemic.

Club	Home Ground	City/Borough	League	Level
Liverpool	Anfield	Liverpool	Premier League	1
Everton	Hill Dickinson Stadium	Liverpool	Premier League	1
Tranmere Rovers	Prenton Park	Wirral	EFL League Two	4

== Levels 5–8 ==
These Merseyside clubs play in semi-pro leagues which are at a level in the English football league system that grants eligibility to enter the FA Trophy, comprising levels 5–8 of the system: the National League and the Northern Premier League. Games between Southport, Marine and Bootle are known as Sefton Derby's as they represent the three biggest towns in Sefton; Southport, Bootle and Crosby.

Club	Home Ground	City/Borough	League	Level
Southport	Haig Avenue	Sefton	National League North	6
Marine	Rossett Park	Sefton	National League North	6
Bootle	New Bucks Park	Sefton	Northern Premier League Division One West	8
Prescot Cables	Valerie Park	Knowsley	Northern Premier League Premier Division	7
Lower Breck	Anfield Sports and Community Centre	Liverpool	Northern Premier League Division One West	8

== Levels 9–10 ==
These Merseyside clubs play in semi-pro and amateur leagues which grant eligibility to enter the FA Vase and are high enough in the English football league system to grant eligibility to enter the FA Cup, comprising levels 9–10 of the system. In Merseyside this consists solely of the North West Counties Football League.

Club	Home Ground	City/Borough	League	Level
A.F.C. Liverpool	Rossett Park	Sefton	North West Counties Football League Premier Division	9
Litherland REMYCA	Litherland Sports Park	Sefton	North West Counties Football League Premier Division	9
Pilkington	Ruskin Drive	St Helens	North West Counties Football League Premier Division	9
Ashville	Villa Park	Wirral	North West Counties Football League Division One South	10
Cammell Laird 1907	Kirklands	Wirral	North West Counties Football League Division One South	10
F.C. St Helens	Windleshaw Sports	St Helens	North West Counties Football League Premier Division	9
South Liverpool	Jericho Lane	Liverpool	North West Counties Football League Premier Division	9
Maghull	Old Hall Field	Sefton	North West Counties Football League Division One North	10
