= 2023–24 North West Counties Football League =

The 2023–24 North West Counties Football League season was the 42nd in the history of the North West Counties Football League, a football competition in England.

The league comprised three divisions: the Premier Division (at level 9 of the English football league system, Step 5 National League System) and two regional divisions at level 10 or Step 6. The latter were designated the First Division North and First Division South, with the champions of each division competing in a single match for the First Division Champions Cup. Additionally, there were two cup competitions: the League Challenge Cup (known as the Macron Challenge Cup for sponsorship reasons), a knockout competition open to all the league's clubs; and the First Division Trophy (known as the Edward Case Cup, named after the trophy), a knockout trophy competition for First Division clubs only.

== Premier Division ==
North West Counties Football League Premier Division
- Season: 2023–24
- Teams: 24
- Champions: Wythenshawe
- Promoted: Wythenshawe; Wythenshawe Town
- Relegated: Skelmersdale United
- Matches: 552
- Goals: 2,023 (3.66 per match)
- Average attendance: 408

Six clubs had left the division after the previous season:

- Ashton Athletic, relegated to First Division North
- Avro, promoted as an inter-step promotion/relegation play-off winner to the Northern Premier League Division One West
- Congleton Town, transferred laterally to the Midland League Premier Division
- Northwich Victoria, transferred laterally to the Midland League Premier Division
- Vauxhall Motors, promoted as champions to the Northern Premier League Division One West
- Winsford United, voluntarily relegated to First Division South rather than be subject to a lateral transfer to the Midland League Premier Division.

The 2023–24 Premier Division club allocations from the FA Leagues Committee (subject to appeal) were announced on 15 May 2023 and the constitution of the division was adopted at the league's AGM on 17 June 2023. The division comprised 24 clubs, 16 remaining from the previous season plus 8 additions:

- Chadderton, promoted as promotion play-off winners from the First Division North
- Cheadle Town, promoted as promotion play-off winners from the First Division South
- Colne, relegated from the Northern Premier League Division One West
- Glossop North End, relegated from the Northern Premier League Division One West
- Pilkington, promoted as champions from the First Division North
- Ramsbottom United, relegated from the Northern Premier League Division One West
- Skelmersdale United, relegated from the Northern Premier League Division One West
- Wythenshawe, promoted as champions from the First Division South and changed their name from Wythenshawe Amateurs

Included in the division were Bury F.C.: they had directly replaced Bury AFC who had merged with Bury FC Supporters' Society (who owned the Bury FC name and Gigg Lane ground) to form the newly constituted club, bringing together the two separate groups of fans of the former Bury FC club (who had been expelled from the Football League in 2019). The inclusion of Bury F.C. (and also relatively well-supported FC Isle of Man and West Didsbury & Chorlton) had a significant effect on attendances in the division: the average per match across the division was a league record 408 (from 341 of the 2021–22 Premier Division) and at their home match versus Prestwich Heys on 26 December 2023 Bury recorded a new Premier Division recognised single match attendance record of 4,833 (previously 4,720 at Macclesfield v AFC Liverpool on 2 April 2022) – Bury had recorded an attendance of 5,451 v. Glossop North End on 29 July 22 but the match was declared void as Bury used an ineligible player.

The FA council announced that, with effect from this season across the National League System, the previously used inter-step play-off system for the second promotion place would be replaced with each Step 5 division (including the NWCFL Premier Division) holding a divisional four-team promotion play-off to determine the second club to be promoted to Step 4. Also from next season four clubs were to be relegated from Step 4 into Step 5 feeder league divisions (for this transitional season there was only one club to be relegated from Step 5 divisions). Accordingly champions (and divisional newcomers) Wythenshawe and promotion play-off winners Wythenshawe Town (who had finished as runners-up of the division) were promoted to the Northern Premier League Division One West, and bottom-placed club Skelmersdale United (who had been relegated into the division this season) were relegated to First Division North. Also leaving the division were Kendal Town who were transferred laterally following a failed appeal against the move to the Northern League Division One.

=== League table ===
Pos	Team	Pld	W	D	L	GF	GA	GD	Pts	Season End Notes
1	Wythenshawe (C, P)	46	30	5	11	111	45	+66	95	Promoted to the Northern Premier; League Division One West
2	Wythenshawe Town (O, P)	46	29	8	9	95	44	+51	95	Won the promotion play-offs, promoted to Northern Premier; League Division One West (Note: Winner from the four clubs who competed in the promotion play-offs)
3	Bury	46	29	8	9	108	50	+58	92 (Note: Bury were deducted 3 points for fielding an ineligible player on 29 July 2023.)	Qualified for the promotion play-offs
4	Charnock Richard	46	22	15	9	107	74	+33	81	Qualified for the promotion play-offs
5	Padiham	46	24	8	14	93	63	+30	80	Qualified for the promotion play-offs
6	Kendal Town	46	24	8	14	105	77	+28	80	Transferred to the Northern League Division One
7	Chadderton	46	23	11	12	95	75	+20	80	
8	Prestwich Heys	46	24	8	14	95	77	+18	80	
9	FC Isle of Man	46	22	6	18	74	77	−3	72	
10	Lower Breck	46	20	11	15	83	73	+10	71	
11	Colne	46	21	8	17	97	67	+30	71	
12	Litherland REMYCA	46	18	8	20	78	96	−18	62	
13	Irlam	46	15	16	15	71	68	+3	61	
14	AFC Liverpool	46	18	5	23	87	114	−27	59	
15	Cheadle Town	46	18	6	22	75	92	−17	57 (Note: Cheadle Town were deducted 3 points for fielding an ineligible player on 16 September 2023.)	
16	West Didsbury & Chorlton	46	14	12	20	73	84	−11	54	
17	Barnoldswick Town	46	14	12	20	88	113	−25	54	
18	Ramsbottom United	46	13	11	22	84	97	−13	50	
19	Longridge Town	46	12	8	26	82	107	−25	44	
20	Burscough	46	11	11	24	74	100	−26	44	
21	Glossop North End	46	11	10	25	64	83	−19	43	
22	Pilkington	46	11	10	25	56	97	−41	43	
23	Squires Gate	46	12	6	28	74	119	−45	42	
24	Skelmersdale United (R)	46	9	5	32	54	131	−77	32	Relegated to First Division North

Source: "Final Tables, Season 2023/24". nwcfl.com., "North West Counties League - North West Counties League Premier Division: 2023 – 24: League Table". nonleaguematters.co.uk.
Rules for classification: 1) points; 2) goal difference; 3) number of goals scored; 4) number of matches won; 5) head-to-head results
(C) Champions; (O) Play-off winners; (P) Promoted; (R) Relegated

=== Results Table ===
Home \ Away	ALV	BAR	BRS	BRY	CHA	CHR	CHT	CLN	GNE	IOM	IRL	KEN	LIT	LON	LOW	PAD	PIL	PRE	RAM	SKE	SQG	WDC	WYS	WYT
AFC Liverpool		6–2	0–5	0–2	0–4	2–2	1–3	2–4	3–2	4–4	2–2	6–3	3–2	1–3	1–1	0–1	2–1	2–0	2–3	3–2	3–5	4–3	2–1	1–0
Barnoldswick T	2–4		4–0	0–7	3–1	0–2	3–5	2–5	3–2	5–2	3–4	4–4	2–3	2–4	3–3	2–0	2–2	3–3	1–1	3–1	2–2	1–1	3–0	0–0
Burscough	2–4	2–3		2–2	1–2	0–2	1–4	2–5	2–2	2–3	1–3	2–2	2–2	1–4	3–2	1–0	1–1	1–1	3–3	2–2 (Note: Burscough v Skelmersdale United: replayed match, original match (26 December 2023, result 3–4) declared void as Skelmersdale United used an ineligible player)	3–0	0–2	1–3	0–2
Bury	3–0	1–2	2–2		1–3	2–2	2–1	4–1	1–0 (Note: Bury v Glossop North End: replayed match, original match (29 July 2023, result 5–1) declared void as Bury used an ineligible player)	1–0	3–0	2–3	4–2	1–1	2–1	1–2	3–1	2–0	2–1	10–1	1–0	4–3	1–1	4–0
Chadderton	1–1	6–1	3–2	3–2		3–2	1–1	2–2	1–4	0–1	0–1	2–2	3–0	3–0	0–1	1–4	3–0	2–3	2–1	3–2	1–0	3–1	0–0	1–0
Charnock Richard	4–1	2–1	2–3	2–2	0–4		2–4	3–2	2–2	1–1	5–1	2–3	3–1	3–2	2–2	3–2	2–0	0–0	5–1	7–1	6–1	2–2	2–6	5–3
Cheadle Town	3–1 (Note: Cheadle Town v AFC Liverpool: replayed match, original match (16 September 2023, result 3–1) declared void as Cheadle Town used an ineligible player)	5–0	2–1	0–2	0–3	0–1		1–2	0–1	3–2	2–5	1–3	4–1	2–3	1–0	1–2	2–0	2–4	0–1	2–1	2–4	1–0	0–4	0–4
Colne	5–0	3–3	1–0	1–3	1–1	0–1	7–1		1–1	0–2	0–1	2–0	2–3	2–3	0–3	1–1	1–3	3–4	4–1	1–0	4–0	2–0	0–1	0–2
Glossop NE	1–3	1–1	1–2	2–1	0–1	1–2	1–2	1–2		0–4	1–1	0–1	3–3	2–1	1–2	4–3	2–0	0–1	2–2	0–1	1–3	1–3	0–1	2–2
Isle of Man	3–2	0–1	3–1	0–2	3–2	3–5	0–1	0–2	3–2		1–0	1–1	0–3	3–2	3–2	2–1	1–0	0–2	2–1	3–0	1–3	1–0	1–0	2–0
Irlam	4–0	2–0	1–1	1–0	0–0	1–2	3–3	1–1	3–2	1–1		1–2	1–1	3–3	1–1	1–2	0–1	2–1	0–3	0–3	4–2	2–1	0–1	0–0
Kendal Town	1–0	2–3	2–0	0–2	5–0	1–1	4–1	2–4	3–0	6–1	1–2		3–1	1–0	1–2	1–1	4–2	1–0	1–2	6–1	2–1	0–2	1–3	2–4
Litherland R	4–2	1–3	4–3	0–6	3–4	1–2	4–4	0–2	1–0	1–2	2–1	2–3		3–1	3–1	1–1	1–0	3–2	1–1	3–1	4–1	1–2	1–0	1–0
Longridge Town	3–2	0–2	1–3	1–2	4–4	1–3	1–1	2–3	2–2	0–2	2–2	0–5	1–0		1–2	2–3	4–1	2–2	1–2	6–0	2–1	5–1	1–4	2–3
Lower Breck	2–3	1–1	3–1	2–1	2–1	2–2	0–0	0–0	2–1	1–1	1–1	4–3	0–1	3–1		2–1	3–0	2–5	5–2	3–2	5–3	3–1	0–1	0–0
Padiham	3–1	3–2	6–0	1–2	2–2	3–0	3–1	1–1	0–1	3–1	1–5	0–3	0–0	3–1	3–0		2–2	1–0	5–1	7–0	0–1	5–1	0–2	2–1
Pilkington	3–0	4–2	0–4	2–3	1–3	1–1	2–2	0–7	2–0	3–1	2–1	0–1	0–0	3–0	0–1	1–2		2–3	1–5	2–2	1–4	3–3	1–0	1–1
Prestwich Heys	4–1	3–1	1–3	1–2	5–2	0–6	2–1	1–0	3–2	3–4	1–1	2–2	5–2	3–1	2–1	2–0	3–0		3–0	2–1	4–2	3–1	2–5	0–2
Ramsbottom U	1–2	1–1	3–0	0–0	2–3	1–1	2–0	0–2	2–3	2–1	1–1	2–4	5–1	3–3	3–2	0–3	5–1	2–4		1–2	1–2	2–2	1–2	2–4
Skelmersdale U	0–3	4–1	1–3	2–1	3–3	2–2	0–2	0–6	0–1	2–0	1–4	1–4	2–1	0–1	1–3	1–3	1–2	1–0	2–6		1–0	1–1	0–5	1–4
Squires Gate	3–4	1–2	0–2	0–2	2–4	1–1	1–2	3–5	3–5	3–2	2–1	2–4	3–4	2–1	0–3	1–1	0–2	2–2	3–2	3–2		1–5	0–3	2–2
W. Didsbury & Ch	2–3	2–1	3–1	0–3	1–3	0–0	2–0	3–0	1–2	2–1	1–1	1–1	3–0	4–3	3–2	0–2	1–1	1–1	2–2	2–0	1–1		0–1	0–3
Wythenshawe	4–0	4–1	1–1	1–1	1–1	2–1	1–2	2–0	2–1	1–2	3–1	4–0	1–2	7–0	4–2	5–1	4–1	0–1	4–0	3–2	7–0	4–2		1–4
Wythenshawe Tn	1–0	3–1	2–1	2–3	4–0	2–1	4–0	1–0	1–1	0–0	1–0	3–1	4–0	2–0	3–0	2–3	4–0	3–1	2–1	3–0	2–0	3–1	2–1	

Source: "Premier Division Results 2023/24". nwcfl.com.
Legend: Blue = home team win; Yellow = draw; Red = away team win.

=== Promotion play-offs ===
The 2023–24 Premier Division promotion play-offs, contested by the clubs that finished second to fifth position in the league table, were won by Wythenshawe Town who had been runners-up of the division.

Semi-finals
2	Wythenshawe Town	1
5	Padiham	0
3	Bury	1
4	Charnock Richard	0

Final
2	Wythenshawe Town	1	(3 p)
3	Bury	1	(2 p)

Source="Premier Division Play-Off Results 2023/24". nwcfl.com.

==== Semi-finals ====
30 April 2024	Wythenshawe Town	1–0	Padiham	Wythenshawe
19:45	Bentham 72'	Report		Stadium: Ericstan Stadium; Attendance: 658

30 April 2024	Bury	1–0	Charnock Richard	Bury
19:45	Cherera 48'	Report		Stadium: Gigg Lane; Attendance: 4,099

==== Final ====
4 May 2024	Wythenshawe Town	1–1 (a.e.t.) (3–2 p)	Bury	Wythenshawe
15:00	Sheridan 52'	Report	Pinnington 82'	Stadium: Ericstan Stadium; Attendance: 1,320

=== Stadiums and locations ===
Locations of the 2023–24 North West Counties Football League Premier Division teams
Locations of 2023–24 North West Counties Premier Division teams (Greater Manchester)
Locations of 2023–24 North West Counties Premier Division team (Isle of Man)

Team	Stadium
AFC Liverpool	Rossett Park, Crosby (groundshare with Marine)
Barnoldswick Town	Greenberfield Lane
Burscough	Victoria Park
Bury	Gigg Lane
Chadderton	MCA Stadium
Charnock Richard	Mossie Park
Cheadle Town	Park Road Stadium
Colne	Holt House
Glossop North End	Surrey Street
FC Isle of Man	The Bowl, Douglas
Irlam	Silver Street
Kendal Town	Parkside Road
Litherland REMYCA	Litherland Sports Park
Longridge Town	Mike Riding Ground
Lower Breck	Anfield Sports and Community Centre
Padiham	Arbories Memorial Sports Ground
Pilkington	Ruskin Drive Sportsground
Prestwich Heys	Adie Moran Park
Ramsbottom United	Harry Williams Riverside Stadium
Skelmersdale United	The Community Ground, Burscough
Squires Gate	School Road
West Didsbury & Chorlton	Brookburn Road, Chorlton
Wythenshawe	Hollyhedge Park
Wythenshawe Town	Ericstan Stadium

== First Division North ==
North West Counties Football League First Division North
- Season: 2023–24
- Teams: 18
- Champions: FC St Helens
- Promoted: FC St Helens; South Liverpool
- Matches: 306
- Goals: 1,143 (3.74 per match)
- Average attendance: 123

Three clubs had left the division after the previous season:

- Chadderton – promoted as promotion play-off winners to the Premier Division
- Cleator Moor Celtic – relegated to the West Lancashire League
- Pilkington – promoted as champions to the Premier Division

The 2023–24 First Division North club allocations from the FA Leagues Committee (subject to appeal) were announced on 15 May 2023; subsequently Shelley were also allocated to the division. The constitution of the division comprising 19 clubs was adopted at the league's AGM on 17 June 2023. However, included club Droylsden were belatedly re-allocated to the First Division South owing to the late withdrawal of Ellesmere Rangers from that division. The final iteration of the First Division North comprised 18 clubs, 15 remaining from the previous season plus 3 additions:

- Ashton Athletic, relegated from the Premier Division
- Route One Rovers, promoted as champions of the Yorkshire Amateur League Supreme Division
- Shelley, former members of the league who had resigned in 2021, promoted as fifth from the West Yorkshire League Premier Division

At the end of the season five clubs left the division: champions FC St Helens and promotion play-off winners South Liverpool (who had finished fifth in the division) were promoted to the Premier Division; in the allocations for the following season Runcorn Town were transferred laterally within the league to the First Division South and both Ilkley Town and Shelley had their requests for a lateral transfer to the Northern Counties East League Division One granted. The latter team together with Garstang in common with all Step 6 second and third from bottom clubs were reprieved from relegation as were Nelson who survived as they had one of the better points per game ratio of the Step 6 bottom clubs.

=== League table ===
Pos	Team	Pld	W	D	L	GF	GA	GD	Pts	Season End Notes
1	FC St Helens (C, P)	34	24	5	5	81	36	+45	77	Promoted to the Premier Division
2	Atherton Laburnum Rovers	34	21	5	8	75	44	+31	68	Qualified for the promotion play-offs
3	Ashton Town	34	20	5	9	84	51	+33	65	Qualified for the promotion play-offs
4	Euxton Villa	34	20	3	11	74	44	+30	63	Qualified for the promotion play-offs
5	South Liverpool (O, P)	34	19	6	9	69	49	+20	63	Won the promotion play-offs, promoted to the Premier Division (Note: Winner from the four clubs who competed in the promotion play-offs)
6	Ilkley Town	34	18	8	8	67	53	+14	62	Transferred to Northern Counties; East League Division One
7	Holker Old Boys	34	19	4	11	78	53	+25	61	
8	Route One Rovers	34	19	1	14	91	81	+10	58	
9	Darwen	34	14	8	12	76	71	+5	50	
10	Bacup Borough	34	13	6	15	66	60	+6	45	
11	Ashton Athletic	34	12	7	15	62	63	−1	43	
12	Daisy Hill	34	10	5	19	42	59	−17	35	
13	Runcorn Town	34	10	5	19	48	78	−30	34 (Note: Runcorn Town were deducted 1 point.)	Transferred to First Division South
14	Steeton	34	9	5	20	40	68	−28	32	
15	AFC Blackpool	34	9	3	22	51	78	−27	30	
16	Garstang	34	7	7	20	57	95	−38	28	Reprieved from relegation
17	Shelley	34	8	4	22	38	81	−43	28	Reprieved from relegation, transferred to Northern Counties; East League Division One
18	Nelson	34	8	5	21	44	79	−35	26 (Note: Nelson were deducted 3 points.)	Reprieved from relegation

Source: "Final Tables, Season 2023/24". nwcfl.com., "North West Counties League - North West Counties League Division One North: 2023 – 24: League Table". nonleaguematters.co.uk.
Rules for classification: 1) points; 2) goal difference; 3) number of goals scored; 4) number of matches won; 5) head-to-head results
(C) Champions; (O) Play-off winners; (P) Promoted

=== Results Table ===
Home \ Away	ABL	ASA	AST	ATH	BAC	DAI	DAR	EUX	FSH	GAR	HOL	ILK	NEL	ROU	RUN	SHE	SLP	STE
AFC Blackpool		0–5	1–3	1–3	2–1	1–4	0–3	0–1	0–2	4–1	0–1	1–2	3–2	0–6	4–1	0–1	3–4	1–1
Ashton Ath	1–4		1–4	3–3	1–1	1–1	2–1	2–1	1–3	5–1	2–1	1–1	5–0	3–2	1–1	3–1	0–2	2–0
Ashton Town	1–0	3–0		0–3	0–1	2–0	6–2	2–1	0–0	4–1	2–2	4–3	2–2	5–2	2–4	9–1	0–2	1–1
Atherton L R	4–0	1–4	0–1		3–0	2–2	2–1	3–2	1–3	3–1	4–1	2–2	2–1	3–0	3–2	0–0	1–2	4–0
Bacup Boro'	2–2	0–0	3–2	2–0		4–0	2–5	0–2	0–2	4–1	6–1	1–3	2–0	5–1	3–4	0–2	2–0	3–1
Daisy Hill	0–2	0–5	0–5	2–2	2–3		0–1	3–1	1–2	1–2	2–5	3–1	1–1	0–1	3–0	0–2	1–3	2–1
Darwen	6–1	2–2	1–4	2–1	2–1	0–0		3–2	4–3	2–2	1–2	2–2	3–0	3–3	4–5	3–3	1–2	3–1
Euxton Villa	3–1	3–1	1–2	0–4	5–2	2–0	3–0		2–1	0–2	2–1	1–3	7–1	6–1	4–0	3–0	1–1	2–1
FC St Helens	5–2	3–1	1–3	3–2	1–1	1–0	2–1	2–0		2–0	3–1	3–0	5–1	5–0	3–2	4–1	1–1	5–0
Garstang	0–6	6–2	3–2	2–3	2–2	2–1	3–5	2–3	3–4		0–2	0–2	2–2	1–4	1–1	2–0	1–2	2–4
Holker OB	4–1	2–1	4–2	2–0	3–1	1–0	1–2	2–2	0–1	2–3		5–0	2–1	6–1	7–1	2–2	2–3	0–3
Ilkley Town	2–1	2–1	2–0	2–3	1–1	0–1	5–3	0–2	1–1	4–2	0–2		2–2	2–1	4–1	3–0	2–1	1–1
Nelson	1–5	1–0	1–2	1–2	0–5	0–1	1–1	3–0	0–1	4–1	0–1	1–2		2–4	2–1	4–1	0–3	4–0
Route One R	2–0	4–2	5–2	1–3	2–4	4–2	3–1	0–3	2–1	6–2	4–3	3–4	4–1		4–1	3–2	4–0	3–1
Runcorn Town	0–0	1–0	2–2	1–2	1–0	0–1	2–3	0–2	2–1	2–2	0–3	0–3	3–0	5–3		1–0	0–4	0–1
Shelley	2–1	2–3	1–4	0–3	3–2	0–3	0–1	0–5	0–2	3–3	1–2	0–1	1–2	0–3	1–0		4–3	3–2
Sth Liverpool	2–1	4–0	0–1	0–2	4–1	2–1	3–3	1–1	2–2	3–0	2–5	1–1	4–1	2–1	3–1	2–1		0–2
Steeton	2–3	2–1	0–2	0–1	2–1	0–4	2–1	0–1	1–3	1–1	0–0	2–4	1–2	1–4	2–3	2–0	2–1	

Source: "First Division North Results 2023/24". nwcfl.com.
Legend: Blue = home team win; Yellow = draw; Red = away team win.

=== Promotion play-offs ===
The 2023–24 First Division North promotion play-offs, contested by the clubs that finished second to fifth position in the league table, were won by South Liverpool who had been fifth-placed in the division.

Semi-finals
3	Ashton Town	4
4	Euxton Villa	3
2	Atherton Laburnum Rovers	0
5	South Liverpool	1

Final
3	Ashton Town	0	(1 p)
5	South Liverpool	0	(3 p)

Source="First Division North Play-Off Results 2023/24". nwcfl.com.

==== Semi-finals ====
20 April 2024	Ashton Town	4–3	Euxton Villa	Ashton-in-Makerfield
15:00	Lomax 11', 69'; Howard 40'; Southworth 90+2'	Report	Uppal 35'; Westwell 60'; Bentham 90+7'	Stadium: Edge Green Street; Attendance: 604

20 April 2024	Atherton Laburnum Rovers	0–1	South Liverpool	Atherton
15:00		Report	Owen 78' (pen.)	Stadium: Crilly Park; Attendance: 226

==== Final ====
27 April 2024	Ashton Town	0–0 (1–3 p)	South Liverpool	Ashton-in-Makerfield
15:00		Report		Stadium: Edge Green Street; Attendance: 1,075

=== Stadia and locations ===
Locations of 2023–24 North West Counties First Division North teams (Greater Manchester)
2023–24 First Division South: Location of clubs
Locations of 2023–24 North West Counties First Division North teams (West Yorkshire)

Team	Stadium
AFC Blackpool	The Mechanics
Ashton Athletic	Brockstedes Park
Ashton Town	Edge Green Street
Atherton Laburnum Rovers	Crilly Park
Bacup Borough	West View
Daisy Hill	New Sirs, Westhoughton
Darwen	The Anchor Ground
Euxton Villa	Jim Fowler Memorial Ground
FC St Helens	Windleshaw Sports
Garstang	The Riverside
Holker Old Boys	Rakesmoor Lane, Barrow-in-Furness
Ilkley Town	MPM Lane
Nelson	Victoria Park
Route One Rovers	Marley Stadium
Runcorn Town	Pavilions Sports Complex
Shelley	Storthes Hall Park
South Liverpool	Jericho Lane
Steeton	Marley Stadium

== First Division South ==
North West Counties Football League First Division South
- Season: 2023–24
- Teams: 18
- Champions: Brocton
- Promoted: Brocton; Abbey Hey
- Matches: 306
- Goals: 1,088 (3.56 per match)
- Average attendance: 157

Five clubs had left the division after the previous season:

- Cheadle Town, promoted as promotion play-off winners to the Premier Division
- Ellesmere Rangers, resigned
- Foley Meir, relegated to the Staffordshire County Senior League
- Rocester, relegated to the Staffordshire County Senior League
- Wythenshawe, promoted as champions to the Premier Division

The 2023–24 First Division South club allocations from the FA Leagues Committee (subject to appeal) were announced on 15 May 2023; Further to this, Winsford United, rather than be subject to a lateral transfer to the Midland League Premier Division took voluntary relegation to this division. Consequently, Uttoxeter Town, who had been transferred to this division, were reprieved from relegation and remained in the Midland League Premier Division. The constitution of the division comprising 18 clubs was adopted at the league's AGM on 17 June 2023. However, owing to the subsequent withdrawal of Ellesmere Rangers from the division Droylsden were re-allocated from the North to South division. The final iteration of the First Division South comprised 18 clubs, 15 remaining from the previous season plus 3 additions:

- Droylsden, returned to the National League System three seasons after withdrawal from the Step 4 Northern Premier League Division One North West
- Market Drayton Town, transferred laterally following relegation from the Midland League Premier Division
- Winsford United, voluntarily relegated from the Premier Division

At the end of the season five clubs left the division. Three were promoted: champions Brocton were transferred laterally in the FA league allocations to the Step 5 Midland League Premier Division; and promotion play-off winners Abbey Hey (who had finished fourth in the division) to the Premier Division where they were joined by the losing promotion play-off finalists Stockport Town (who had been runners-up of the division), who owing to a shortfall of clubs in the Premier Division were awarded a place as a First Division club with the best points per game ratio. In the FA Leagues Committee club allocation for the following season the other two leavers, Droylsden and Maine Road, were transferred laterally to the First Division North. No clubs were relegated with both Winsford United and Market Drayton Town being reprieved.

=== League table ===
Pos	Team	Pld	W	D	L	GF	GA	GD	Pts	Season End Notes
1	Brocton (C, P)	34	25	3	6	96	30	+66	78	Promoted, transferred to the Midland League Premier Division
2	Stockport Town (P)	34	21	9	4	78	42	+36	72	Losing promotion play-off finalist, promoted to Premier Division
3	Sandbach United	34	20	5	9	75	51	+24	65	Qualified for promotion play-offs
4	Abbey Hey (O, P)	34	18	8	8	68	55	+13	62	Won the promotion play-offs, promoted to Premier Division (Note: Winner from the four clubs who competed in the promotion play-offs)
5	Droylsden	34	18	4	12	75	59	+16	58	Qualified for promotion play-offs. Transferred to First Division North
6	Cheadle Heath Nomads	34	14	7	13	60	59	+1	49	
7	Barnton	34	14	6	14	46	48	−2	48	
8	Abbey Hulton United	34	13	6	15	56	69	−13	45	
9	Eccleshall	34	11	11	12	51	60	−9	44	
10	Maine Road	34	13	5	16	58	72	−14	44	Transferred to First Division North
11	Stafford Town	34	12	6	16	61	67	−6	42	
12	Alsager Town	34	10	11	13	59	53	+6	41	
13	Cammell Laird 1907	34	10	11	13	56	66	−10	41	
14	Stockport Georgians	34	11	7	16	46	59	−13	40	
15	Ashville	34	9	11	14	44	53	−9	38	
16	New Mills	34	10	6	18	59	77	−18	36	
17	Winsford United	34	9	1	24	53	78	−25	28	Reprieved from relegation
18	Market Drayton Town	34	8	3	23	47	90	−43	27	Reprieved from relegation

Source: "Final Tables, Season 2023/24". nwcfl.com., "North West Counties League - North West Counties League Division One North: 2023 – 24: League Table". nonleaguematters.co.uk.
Rules for classification: 1) points; 2) goal difference; 3) number of goals scored; 4) number of matches won; 5) head-to-head results
(C) Champions; (O) Play-off winners; (P) Promoted

=== Results Table ===
Home \ Away	AHE	AHU	ALS	ASH	BAR	BRO	CAM	CHN	DRO	ECC	MAI	MAR	NEW	SAN	STA	STG	STT	WIN
Abbey Hey		3–1	3–3	2–2	2–0	1–0	0–0	0–5	3–1	1–3	2–1	2–1	5–0	1–1	3–1	5–0	1–3	2–1
Abbey Hulton U	1–2		1–0	0–0	1–4	1–3	2–2	3–0	3–1	1–2	3–1	0–2	0–6	3–3	1–4	2–2	1–2	1–1
Alsager Town	3–3	1–2		3–2	2–1	1–2	3–3	5–0	2–2	0–0	3–0	4–3	2–1	0–1	2–2	2–2	1–0	5–0
Ashville	2–2	0–1	2–1		0–2	1–2	0–0	2–1	6–1	2–2	2–1	4–1	1–2	4–0	1–2	0–0	2–2	3–0
Barnton	1–1	1–3	1–0	1–0		2–3	1–1	0–3	1–0	3–0	2–1	2–0	0–2	1–0	2–0	2–0	1–2	4–3
Brocton	5–0	5–0	2–1	0–1	4–0		4–1	4–0	1–2	0–2	2–2	3–0	10–2	2–0	3–1	3–0	1–2	3–0
Cammell L 1907	3–4	2–2	3–2	1–0	1–0	1–5		1–2	0–4	1–1	0–2	4–1	1–3	1–0	0–1	2–1	1–1	4–2
Cheadle Heath N	2–0	1–5	1–3	0–1	4–1	0–1	3–3		1–0	1–1	4–1	4–0	2–2	0–3	4–3	0–1	0–0	2–0
Droylsden	1–2	3–0	1–0	2–2	2–0	0–1	3–0	1–4		5–4	0–3	7–2	6–3	0–3	1–0	2–0	3–1	2–1
Eccleshall	1–1	0–1	0–0	1–1	2–1	1–1	0–4	4–0	1–2		1–3	0–0	2–1	4–3	1–5	2–3	2–1	1–3
Maine Road	0–1	0–2	3–1	1–1	2–1	0–3	3–2	3–3	0–4	3–3		4–0	2–1	1–3	2–1	2–1	0–5	1–3
Market Drayton T	4–0	0–1	2–0	4–0	2–2	0–8	2–1	1–1	3–5	2–3	3–7		3–0	2–6	0–3	0–2	2–3	2–0
New Mills	2–1	1–5	1–1	2–0	1–1	0–1	3–3	4–0	3–3	2–3	2–3	2–0		1–4	0–0	4–0	1–2	1–5
Sandbach United	1–4	4–0	2–1	1–1	1–2	1–4	1–1	1–0	4–3	2–1	4–1	3–2	2–1		3–1	2–2	0–2	4–0
Stafford Town	2–4	4–3	2–2	6–0	3–0	3–3	1–5	0–4	0–3	0–2	3–1	0–1	3–1	1–2		2–1	2–2	2–7
Stockpt Georgians	1–4	1–2	2–0	3–1	2–2	0–1	0–1	1–3	3–1	1–1	2–2	2–1	2–1	1–3	3–0		1–2	2–0
Stockport Town	1–0	4–3	1–1	2–0	0–0	3–2	5–1	3–3	1–1	4–0	4–1	5–1	4–1	2–5	0–0	3–2		2–1
Winsford United	2–3	4–1	2–4	4–0	0–4	1–4	4–2	1–2	1–3	2–0	0–1	2–0	0–2	1–2	0–3	1–2	1–4	

Source: "First Division South Results 2023/24". nwcfl.com.
Legend: Blue = home team win; Yellow = draw; Red = away team win.

=== Promotion play-offs ===
The 2023–24 First Division South promotion play-offs, contested by the clubs that finished second to fifth position in the league table, were won by Abbey Hey who had been fourth-placed in the division.

Semi-finals
2	Stockport Town	1
5	Droylsden	0
3	Sandbach United	1
4	Abbey Hey	3

Final
2	Stockport Town	1	(1 p)
4	Abbey Hey	1	(4 p)

Source="First Division South Play-Off Results 2023/24". nwcfl.com.

==== Semi-finals ====
20 April 2024	Stockport Town	1–0	Droylsden	Woodley
15:00	McLaughlin 90+6'	Report		Stadium: Stockport Sports Village; Attendance: 690

20 April 2024	Sandbach United	1–3	Abbey Hey	Sandbach
15:00	Cain 74'	Report	Clooney 6', 27'; Dickin 45'	Stadium: Sandbach Community Football Centre; Attendance: 514

==== Final ====
27 April 2024	Stockport Town	1–1 (1–4 p)	Abbey Hey	Woodley
15:00	McLaughlin 28'	Report	Clooney 52'	Stadium: Stockport Sports Village; Attendance: 904

=== Stadia and locations ===
Locations of 2023–24 North West Counties First Division South teams (Greater Manchester)
2023–24 First Division South: Location of clubs
Locations of the 2023–24 North West Counties Football League First Division South teams in the North West

Team	Stadium
Abbey Hey	The Abbey Stadium, Gorton
Abbey Hulton United	Birches Head Road
Alsager Town	Wood Park Stadium
Ashville	Villa Park, Wallasey
Barnton	Townfield
Brocton	Silkmore Lane
Cammell Laird 1907	Kirklands, Birkenhead
Cheadle Heath Nomads	The Heath
Droylsden	Butcher's Arms Ground
Eccleshall	Pershall Park
Maine Road	Brantingham Road, Chorlton
Market Drayton Town	Greenfields Sports Ground
New Mills	Church Lane
Sandbach United	Sandbach Community Football Centre
Stafford Town	Evans Park
Stockport Georgians	Cromley Road
Stockport Town	Stockport Sports Village
Winsford United	Barton Stadium

== League Challenge Cup ==
The 2023–24 League Challenge Cup (known for sponsorship reasons as the Macron Cup) was open to all the clubs from the Premier and First Divisions North and South (indicated in the results listings below by '(PD)', '(FDN)' and '(FDS)' respectively). The final, played at Accrington Stanley F.C., featured two Premier Division clubs and was won 3–0 by Barnoldswick Town who defeated Chadderton.

The initial draw comprised 59 clubs as FC Isle of Man and Barnton had both scratched from the competition. Prior to the first round draw five clubs were allocated byes to the second round. The cup holders usually received a bye however, as Congleton Town had left the league it was the five highest-ranked clubs in the 2022–23 Premier Division that didn't achieve promotion who received a bye. For the first two rounds clubs were drawn into four regional groupings: Groups 1 to 3 comprised fifteen clubs with AFC Liverpool (Group 1), Prestwich Heys (Group 2) and Bury (Group 3) having first round byes; at the time of the draw Group 4 comprised fourteen clubs with West Didsbury & Chorlton and Wythenshawe Town receiving first round byes however, following the late withdrawal of Ellesmere Rangers from the league their first round the opponents, Cheadle Heath Nomads progressed directly to the second round.

=== First round ===
Tie	Home team (division)	Score	Away team (division)
Group One
1	Atherton Laburnum Rovers (FDN)	5–0	Ashton Athletic (FDN)
2	Burscough (PD)	1–0	AFC Blackpool (FDN)
3	Charnock Richard (PD)	2–0	Euxton Villa (FDN)
4	Garstang (FDN)	4–0	Squires Gate (PD)
5	Holker Old Boys (FDN)	4–2	Daisy Hill (FDN)
6	Longridge Town (PD)	5–1	Ashton Town (FDN)
7	Skelmersdale United (PD)	1–3	Kendal Town (PD)
Group Two
8	Irlam (PD)	0–0 (4–3 p)	South Liverpool (FDN)
9	Litherland REMYCA (PD)	1–0	Pilkington (PD)
10	Lower Breck (PD)	1–2	Glossop North End (PD)
11	Maine Road (FDS)	0–2	Ashville (FDS)
12	Runcorn Town (FDN)	3–1	FC St Helens (FDN)
13	Winsford United (FDS)	0–1	Chadderton (PD)
14	Wythenshawe (PD)	3–1	Cammell Laird 1907 (FDS)
Group Three
15	Colne (PD)	3–4	Barnoldswick Town (PD)
16	Darwen (FDN)	0–0 (3–2 p)	Padiham (PD)
17	Droylsden (FDS)	5–1	Abbey Hey (FDS)
17	Match moved to Abbey Hey following two postponements at Droylsden		
18	New Mills (FDS)	2–0	Bacup Borough (FDN)
19	Ramsbottom United (PD)	3–0	Nelson (FDN)
20	Route One Rovers (FDN)	2–1	Steeton (FDN)
21	Shelley (FDN)	2–0	Ilkley Town (FDN)
Group Four
22	Abbey Hulton United (FDS)	4–4 (1–2 p)	Stafford Town (FDS)
23	Alsager Town (FDS)	4–3	Eccleshall (FDS)
24	Cheadle Heath Nomads (FDS)	W–x	Ellesmere Rangers (FDS)
24	Ellesmere Rangers withdrew from the league, match awarded to Cheadle Heath Nomads		
25	Cheadle Town (PD)	1–1 (5–4 p)	Sandbach United (FDS)
26	Market Drayton Town (FDS)	3–4	Stockport Georgians (FDS)
27	Stockport Town (FDS)	1–4	Brocton (FDS)

=== Second round ===
Tie	Home team (division)	Score	Away team (division)
Group One
1	Atherton Laburnum Rovers (FDN)	6–1	AFC Liverpool (PD)
2	Burscough (PD)	0–5	Kendal Town (PD)
3	Garstang (FDN)	1–2	Longridge Town (PD)
3	Match moved to Longridge Town following two postponements at Garstang		
4	Holker Old Boys (FDN)	1–2	Charnock Richard (PD)
Group Two
5	Glossop North End (PD)	2–3	Ashville (FDS)
6	Litherland REMYCA (PD)	3–4	Chadderton (PD)
7	Prestwich Heys (PD)	2–2 (7–6 p)	Wythenshawe (PD)
8	Runcorn Town (FDN)	2–4	Irlam (PD)
Group Three
9	Droylsden (FDS)	2–1	Darwen (FDN)
10	New Mills (FDS)	0–2	Route One Rovers (FDN)
10	Match moved to Route One Rovers following two postponements at New Mills		
11	Ramsbottom United (PD)	2–2 (5–6 p)	Bury (PD)
12	Shelley (FDN)	0–4	Barnoldswick Town (PD)
Group Four
13	Brocton (FDS)	2–3	Alsager Town (FDS)
14	Cheadle Heath Nomads (FDS)	2–1	Stafford Town (FDS)
15	Stockport Georgians (FDS)	2–1	Wythenshawe Town (PD)
16	West Didsbury & Chorlton (PD)	0–3	Cheadle Town (PD)

=== Third round ===
The groupings from the previous rounds were discontinued. Neither of the two First Division North clubs who played in this round survived: three First Division South (from five who played) and five Premier Division (from nine) clubs progressed to the quarter-finals.

Tie	Home team (division)	Score	Away team (division)
1	Alsager Town (FDS)	2–0	Cheadle Town (PD)
2	Barnoldswick Town (PD)	4–0	Route One Rovers (FDN)
3	Bury (PD)	0–1	Charnock Richard (PD)
4	Cheadle Heath Nomads (FDS)	1–3	Chadderton (PD)
5	Droylsden (FDS)	5–3	Longridge Town (PD)
6	Irlam (PD)	1–3	Prestwich Heys (PD)
7	Kendal Town (PD)	4–4 (4–1 p)	Atherton Laburnum Rovers (FDN)
8	Stockport Georgians (FDS)	0–2	Ashville (FDS)

=== Quarter-finals ===
Of the three First Division South clubs in the draw two were drawn together and the other defeated Premier Division opposition to leave two clubs each from the First Division South and Premier Division to contest the semi-finals.

Tie	Home team (division)	Score	Away team (division)
1	Alsager Town (FDS)	0–0 (a.e.t.) (3–2 p)	Prestwich Heys (PD)
2	Barnoldswick Town (PD)	2–1	Charnock Richard (PD)
3	Droylsden (FDS)	1–0	Ashville (FDS)
4	Kendal Town (PD)	2–3	Chadderton (PD)

=== Semi-finals ===
Both ties pitched First Division South and Premier Division clubs against each other. The two Premier Division clubs advanced to the final.

Tie	Home team (division)	Score	Away team (division)
1	Barnoldswick Town (PD)	4–2	Alsager Town (FDS)
2	Chadderton (PD)	W–x	Droylsden (FDS)
2	Match awarded to Chadderton: Droylsden won 4-1 but were disqualified (ineligible player)		

=== Final ===
11 May 2024	Barnoldswick Town (PD)	3–0	Chadderton (PD)	Accrington
15:00 BST	Andrew Hill 28'; Luke Stowe 29'; Oliver Roberts 77'	Report		Stadium: Accrington Stanley F.C. (Wham Stadium, Crown Ground); Attendance: 911

source: "League Challenge Cup Results: 2023/24 Season". nwcfl.com.

== First Division Trophy ==
The 2023–24 First Division Trophy (known as the Edward Case Cup, the name of the trophy) was open to all clubs from the First Divisions North and South. The final, contested by two First Division North clubs, was played at Wythenshawe Town F.C. where Bacup Borough defeated Euxton Villa 2–1. Bacup Borough were the third club to win the cup in consecutive seasons (after AFC Liverpool in 2010 and Sandbach United in 2020).

Up to the Quarter-finals the competition was organised into North and South sections (per the divisions at the time of draw for the competition). When the draw was made the two First Divisions comprised a total of 37 clubs and therefore five preliminary round ties were arranged, the ten clubs involved comprised the three clubs promoted to the divisions and the seven clubs (3 North and 4 South Division clubs) with the lowest league positions from the 2022–23 season. The subsequent late withdrawal of Ellesmere Rangers from the South Division who had been drawn into the first round meant that their prospective opponents Barnton progressed directly to the second round. At the time of the draw newly admitted club Droylsden had been allocated to the First Division North and therefore featured in the North section of the draw; however, as a consequence of the withdrawal of Ellesmere Rangers they played the season in the First Division South.

=== Preliminary round ===
Tie	Home team	Score	Away team
North Group
1	Daisy Hill	5–1	Runcorn Town
2	Droylsden	3–0	Shelley
3	Route One Rovers	0–2	Ashton Town
South Group
4	Abbey Hey	1–3	Cammell Laird 1907
5	Stafford Town	1–6	Alsager Town

=== First round ===
Tie	Home team	Score	Away team
North Group
1	Ashton Athletic	1–4	South Liverpool
2	Atherton Laburnum Rovers	1–2	Ashton Town
3	Daisy Hill	0–1	Bacup Borough
4	Euxton Villa	9–2	AFC Blackpool
5	Holker Old Boys	3–1	Steeton
6	Ilkley Town	3–4	Droylsden
7	Nelson	2–2 (10–9 p)	Garstang
8	Darwen	4–1	FC St Helens
South Group
9	Abbey Hulton United	1–5	Winsford United
10	Brocton	0–1	Eccleshall
11	Cammell Laird 1907	1–2	Stockport Georgians
12	Ellesmere Rangers	x–W	Barnton
12	Ellesmere Rangers withdrew from the league, match awarded to Barnton		
13	Maine Road	1–3	Ashville
14	Market Drayton Town	4–3	Cheadle Heath Nomads
15	New Mills	4–2	Stockport Town
16	Sandbach United	2–2 (6–5 p)	Alsager Town

=== Second round ===
Tie	Home team	Score	Away team
North Group
1	Bacup Borough	3–2	Ashton Town
2	Darwen	1–3	Euxton Villa
3	Droylsden	5–1	Nelson
4	Holker Old Boys	1–4	South Liverpool
South Group
5	Barnton	2–2 (1–3 p)	Ashville
6	Sandbach United	10–3	Eccleshall
7	Stockport Georgians	2–0	New Mills
8	Winsford United	6–0	Market Drayton Town

=== Quarter-finals ===
This round saw the end of the separation of clubs into North and South groups. Clubs from North and South divisions are indicated in the results listings below by '(N)' and '(S)' respectively (note Droylsden had been allocated to the North group of the initial draw but played in the First Division South, creating an imbalance of divisional representation in this round)

Tie	Home team (division)	Score	Away team (division)
1	Ashville (S)	0–0 (2–3 p)	South Liverpool (N)
2	Bacup Borough (N)	4–1	Sandbach United (S)
3	Droylsden (S)	1–0	Stockport Georgians (S)
4	Euxton Villa (N)	1–1 (3–2 p)	Winsford United (S)

=== Semi-finals ===
The last remaining South Division club, Droylsden, were eliminated in this round creating a final contested by First Division North clubs.

Tie	Home team (division)	Score	Away team (division)
1	Bacup Borough (N)	2–0	South Liverpool (N)
2	Euxton Villa (N)	2–0	Droylsden (S)

=== Final ===
6 May 2024	Bacup Borough (N)	2–1	Euxton Villa (N)	Wythenshawe
15:00 BST	Lewis-Simon Byrne 30'; Malachi Clarke 47'	Report	Rajwinder Uppal 86'	Stadium: Wythenshawe Town F.C. (Ericstan Park); Attendance: 729

source: "Edward Case Cup Results: 2023/24 Season". nwcfl.com.

== First Division Champions Cup ==
The 2023–24 First Division Champions Cup was contested by the champions of each of the First Divisions North and South. In the final played at Brocton (the participant with the best record over the league season) the winners were First Division North champions FC St Helens.

20 April 2024	Brocton (S)	0–1	FC St Helens (N)	Stafford
15:00 BST			Ethan Van-Aston 1'	Stadium: Brocton F.C., Old Police Sports Ground; Attendance: 203

source: "First Division Champions Cup Results: 2023/24 Season". nwcfl.com.
