= 2021–22 FA Vase =

Football Association Vase

Tournament details
- Country: England; Wales; Jersey; Isle of Man
- Dates: Qualifying: 10 – 26 September 2021; Competition Proper: 22 October 2021 – 22 May 2022
- Teams: Qualifying: 567; Competition Proper: 51 (+ 182 from Qualifying); Total: 618

Final positions
- Champions: Newport Pagnell Town (1st title)
- Runners-up: Littlehampton Town

The 2021–22 FA Vase (Known for sponsorship reasons as the Buildbase FA Vase) was the 48th season of the FA Vase, an annual football competition for teams playing in Levels 9 and 10 (steps 5 & 6) of the English National League System. The competition is played with two qualifying rounds followed by six proper rounds, semi-finals, and the final played at Wembley Stadium. All ties this season were played to a finish on the day. For this season there were no replays in any of the rounds to minimise fixture congestion due to late start of the football season brought about by the COVID-19 pandemic. If games finished level after 90 minutes, the match was decided by penalties to find the winner of the tie, apart from the Final where there were 30 minutes extra time (15 minutes each way) followed by penalties if still level after the extra time period.

== Calendar ==
Round	Main date	Number of fixtures	Clubs remaining	New entries this round	Prize money winners	Prize money losers
First round qualifying	Saturday, 11 September 2021	203	618 → 415	406	£525	£175
Second round qualifying	Saturday, 25 September 2021	182	415 → 233	161	£675	£225
First round proper	Saturday, 23 October 2021	105	233 → 128	28	£750	£250
Second round proper	Saturday, 20 November 2021	64	128 → 64	23	£825	£275
Third round proper	Saturday, 11 December 2021	32	64 → 32	None	£1,050	£350
Fourth round proper	Saturday, 15 January 2022	16	32 → 16	None	£1,875	£625
Fifth round proper	Saturday, 12 February 2022	8	16 → 8	None	£2,250	£750
Quarter-finals	Saturday, 12 March 2022	4	8 → 4	None	£4,125	£1,375
Semi-finals	Saturday, 2 April 2022	2	4 → 2	None	£5,475	£1,825
Final	Sunday, 22 May 2022	1	2 → 1	None	£30,000	£15,000

== First qualifying round ==
The draw was made on 9 July 2021.

Tie	Home team (tier)	Score	Away team (tier)	Att.
Friday, 10 September 2021
7	Washington (10)	0–5	Thornaby (9)	107
131	Eversley & California (10)	3–0	Virginia Water (9)	168
90	St Margaretsbury (9)	0–2	Benfleet (10)	75
144	Canterbury City (9)	5–0	FC Elmstead (10)	90
36	FC Humber United (10)	1–4	Parkgate (10)	116
41	Handsworth (9)	1–2	Golcar United (10)	278
Saturday, 11 September 2021
56	Uttoxeter Town (9)	2–0	Littleton (10)	50
110	Burnham (9)	6–1	Bedford (10)	86
1	Padiham (9)	0–4	North Shields (9)	243
2	Chester-Le-Street Town (10)	1–1 (3–1 p)	Jarrow (10)	122
3	Willington (10)	3–2	Tow Law Town (10)	110
4	West Allotment Celtic (9)	5–5 (4–3 p)	Steeton (10)	84
5	Carlisle City (10)	1–0	Guisborough Town (9)	146
6	Whitley Bay (9)	3–4	Billingham Synthonia (10)	422
8	Squires Gate (9)	1–1 (3–4 p)	Garforth Town (9)	41
9	Newcastle University (10)	1–1 (3–4 p)	Heaton Stannington (10)	88
10	Barnoldswick Town (9)	3–3 (9–8 p)	AFC Blackpool (10)	253
11	Easington Colliery (10)	2–1	Redcar Athletic (9)	85
12	Campion (10)	3–3 (2–3 p)	Newton Aycliffe (9)	100
13	Crook Town (9)	0–2	Eccleshill United (9)	204
14	Sunderland West End (10)	2–3	Cleator Moor Celtic (10)	34
15	Sunderland RCA (9)	1–2	Redcar Town (10)	87
16	Bishop Auckland (9)	2–2 (15–14 p)	Ryton & Crawcrook Albion (10)	268
17	Ilkley Town (10)	1–2	Penrith (9)	121
18	Newcastle Benfield (9)	3–2	Ashington (9)	192
19	Silsden (9)	1–2	Albion Sports (9)	117
20	Litherland REMYCA (9)	0–6	Wythenshawe Town (9)	68
21	Avro (9)	2–1	AFC Darwen (10)	85
22	AFC Liverpool (9)	5–3	Charnock Richard (9)	114
23	Athersley Recreation (9)	1–5	Chadderton (10)	121
24	Brigg Town (10)	3–2	Cammell Laird 1907 (10)	269
25	Runcorn Town (9)	4–1	Ashton Town (10)	114
26	FC St Helens (10)	w/o	South Liverpool (10)	NA
Walkover for South Liverpool – FC St Helens not accepted into the competition
27	Burscough (9)	2–1	Hallam (10)	106
28	New Mills (10)	1–1 (6–5 p)	Armthorpe Welfare (10)	120
29	Bacup Borough (10)	1–0	Penistone Church (9)	122
30	St Helens Town (10)	0–4	Cheadle Heath Nomads (10)	38
31	West Didsbury & Chorlton (10)	3–2	Nostell MW (10)	509
32	Northwich Victoria (9)	1–2	Bury AFC (10)	507
33	Skelmersdale United (9)	9–1	Retford (10)	145
34	Maltby Main (9)	1–1 (5–4 p)	Glasshoughton Welfare (10)	75
35	Swallownest (10)	3–1	Bottesford Town (9)	134
37	Selby Town (10)	5–2	Hemsworth Miners Welfare (9)	302
38	Winterton Rangers (9)	3–2	Macclesfield (9)	363
39	Dronfield Town (10)	1–0	Barnton (10)	92
42	Cheadle Town (10)	0–1	Irlam (9)	75
43	Abbey Hey (10)	1–0	Ashton Athletic (9)	72
44	Shifnal Town (9)	5–1	Smethwick Rangers (10)	108
46	Brocton (10)	1–5	Boldmere St. Michaels (9)	89
47	Winsford United (9)	3–1	Stapenhill (10)	145
48	Hinckley LR (9)	3–0	Cradley Town (10)	76
49	Shawbury United (10)	0–4	Romulus (9)	25
50	Lichfield City (9)	2–1	FC Stratford (10)	118
51	Haughmond (9)	2–3	Ashby Ivanhoe (10)	43
52	Wem Town (10)	w/o	Bilston Town (10)	NA
Walkover for Bilston Town – Wem Town not accepted into the competition
53	Bewdley Town (9)	2–2 (7–6 p)	Hereford Lads Club (9)	109
54	Wellington (10)	w/o	Nuneaton Griff (10)	NA
Nuneaton Griff awarded a walkover due to Wellington withdrawing from the Hellenic Football League.
55	Stone Old Alleynians (9)	2–3	Heather St John's (9)	77
57	Atherstone Town (10)	2–1	Abbey Hulton United (10)	282
58	AFC Bridgnorth (10)	2–1	Rocester (10)	55
59	Studley (10)	2–0	Paget Rangers (10)	60
60	Whitchurch Alport (9)	3–0	Tividale (9)	115
61	Coventry Copsewood (10)	2–8	Rugby Town (9)	79
62	Gresley Rovers (9)	7–0	Dudley Sports (10)	205
63	Stafford Town (10)	w/o	Eccleshall (10)	NA
Stafford Town awarded a walkover due to Eccleshall withdrawing from the competition.
64	St Martins (10)	0–18	Hinckley AFC (10)	80
65	Bourne Town (10)	1–2	Belper United (10)	115
66	Clipstone (10)	1–1 (4–5 p)	St Andrews (10)	59
67	Teversal (10)	0–2	Eastwood Community (9)	81
68	Saffron Dynamo (10)	1–1 (1–4 p)	Quorn (9)	61
69	Melton Town (9)	P–P	West Bridgford (10)	NA
70	Sherwood Colliery (9)	1–0	Borrowash Victoria (10)	115
71	Selston (9)	2–1	Barrow Town (10)	122
72	Dunkirk (10)	3–0	AFC Mansfield (9)	63
73	Leicester Nirvana (9)	4–1	Clifton All Whites (10)	18
74	Birstall United (10)	2–2 (6–5 p)	Kirby Muxloe (10)	90
75	Hucknall Town (10)	1–3	Gedling MW (10)	192
76	Ingles (10)	4–1	Blackstones (10)	40
77	Boston Town (9)	4–1	Lutterworth Athletic (10)	105
78	Rainworth MW (10)	0–2	Heanor Town (9)	99
79	Deeping Rangers (9)	3–0	Holwell Sports (10)	120
80	Debenham LC (10)	1–1 (4–2 p)	Peterborough Northern Star (9)	53
81	Eynesbury Rovers (9)	2–0	Huntingdon Town (10)	147
82	Wisbech St Mary (10)	0–6	Great Yarmouth Town (10)	49
83	Godmanchester Rovers (9)	6–1	FC Parson Drove (10)	75
84	Walsham-le-Willows (9)	A–A	March Town United (9)	100
Match abandoned tied 0–0, due to a supporter requiring an ambulance.
86	Brimsdown (10)	0–1	Barkingside (10)	133
87	Whitton United (9)	4–3	Enfield Borough (10)	45
88	Takeley (9)	2–0	Frenford (10)	85
89	Long Melford (9)	3–0	Little Oakley (9)	96
91	Newbury Forest (10)	1–0	Haverhill Borough (10)	45
92	Halstead Town (10)	1–2	Potton United (9)	201
94	Walthamstow (9)	0–0 (3–4 p)	Hadleigh United (9)	84
95	Woodbridge Town (9)	1–1 (4–5 p)	Woodford Town (9)	129
96	Hoddesdon Town (9)	5–2	FC Clacton (9)	83
97	Biggleswade United (9)	0–8	Southend Manor (9)	45
98	Maccabi London Lions (10)	2–1	St. Panteleimon (9)	46
99	Stotfold (10)	1–5	White Ensign (9)	165
101	Park View (10)	2–2 (1–3 p)	Sawbridgeworth Town (9)	23
102	Harwich & Parkeston (10)	1–2	Ipswich Wanderers (10)	120
103	Brantham Athletic (9)	1–2	Holland (10)	48

Tie	Home team (tier)	Score	Away team (tier)	Att.
104	Sudbury Sports (10)	w/o	May & Baker (10)	NA
Walkover for May & Baker – Sudbury Sports not accepted into the competition
105	Buckhurst Hill (10)	3–0	Enfield (9)	315
106	Windsor (9)	3–0	Kensington & Ealing Borough (10)	144
107	British Airways (10)	2–2 (5–4 p)	Dunstable Town (9)	48
109	Cogenhoe United (9)	2–3	Harefield United (9)	62
111	Amersham Town (10)	2–3	Winslow United (10)	82
113	Holmer Green (9)	2–0	Spelthorne Sports (9)	52
114	Buckingham Athletic (10)	4–2	Rushden & Higham United (10)	65
115	Long Buckby (9)	2–2 (2–4 p)	Tring Athletic (9)	69
116	Arlesey Town (9)	4–4 (3–4 p)	FC Deportivo Galicia (10)	80
117	Risborough Rangers (9)	3–2	Edgware Town (9)	103
118	London Colney (9)	1–1 (4–3 p)	Leverstock Green (9)	48
119	Hilltop (10)	4–2	Langley (10)	50
120	Ardley United (9)	5–0	Burton Park Wanderers (10)	62
121	Egham Town (9)	1–1 (11–10 p)	Crawley Green (9)	47
122	Broadfields United (9)	1–0	Holyport (9)	40
123	Aylesbury Vale Dynamos (9)	3–1	London Tigers (10)	88
124	Wembley (9)	5–1	Oxhey Jets (9)	51
125	Camberley Town (9)	1–1 (4–5 p)	Long Crendon (10)	40
126	Sheerwater (9)	4–1	Roman Glass St George (9)	51
127	Shortwood United (10)	4–2	Cove (10)	48
128	Longlevens (10)	3–2	Fairford Town (9)	84
129	Wokingham & Emmbrook (9)	4–0	Moreton Rangers (10)	75
130	Frimley Green (9)	3–0	Shrivenham (9)	44
132	Berks County (10)	3–1	Newent Town (10)	71
133	Hengrove Athletic (10)	0–2	Ascot United (9)	70
134	Stonehouse Town (10)	0–2	Ashton & Backwell United (9)	74
135	Brislington (9)	4–0	Fleet Town (9)	75
136	Almondsbury (10)	1–2	Cheltenham Saracens (10)	34
137	Royal Wootton Bassett Town (9)	1–0	Knaphill (10)	78
138	Bishop's Cleeve (9)	4–1	Thornbury Town (9)	94
139	Reading City (9)	1–2	Cribbs (9)	30
140	Malmesbury Victoria (10)	2–4	Tuffley Rovers (9)	83
141	Clanfield (10)	2–3	Wallingford Town (10)	45
142	Lydney Town (9)	3–3 (4–5 p)	Hallen (9)	77
143	Rochester United (10)	3–2	Hollands & Blair (9)	170
145	Staplehurst Monarchs (10)	3–2	Sporting Bengal United (9)	122
146	Broadbridge Heath (9)	3–3 (5–6 p)	Croydon (10)	152
147	Erith Town (9)	2–0	Sporting Club Thamesmead (10)	50
148	AFC Uckfield Town (9)	2–3	Colliers Wood United (9)	61
149	Westside (10)	1–2	Snodland Town (10)	38
150	Tunbridge Wells (9)	1–1 (4–3 p)	Roffey (10)	177
151	Abbey Rangers (9)	4–0	Horsham YMCA (9)	33
152	Crawley Down Gatwick (9)	3–1	Lewisham Borough (10)	38
153	Eastbourne United (9)	0–3	Bridon Ropes (10)	60
155	Raynes Park Vale (9)	3–1	Steyning Town Community (9)	62
156	Molesey (9)	0–2	Shoreham (10)	47
157	Banstead Athletic (9)	0–1	Horley Town (9)	33
158	Lordswood (9)	4–0	Storrington Community (10)	60
159	Eastbourne Town (9)	0–1	Sheppey United (9)	238
160	Sutton Athletic (10)	4–2	Newhaven (9)	67
161	East Preston (9)	0–5	Redhill (9)	62
162	Lingfield (9)	1–2	Erith & Belvedere (9)	56
163	Larkfield & New Hythe Wanderers (10)	2–3	Epsom & Ewell (10)	187
164	Seaford Town (10)	1–1 (4–2 p)	Peacehaven & Telscombe (9)	158
165	Billingshurst (10)	0–3	Forest Hill Park (10)	41
166	Rusthall (9)	0–2	Crowborough Athletic (9)	194
167	Balham (9)	1–2	Tower Hamlets (9)	28
168	Bearsted (9)	0–1	Fisher (9)	70
170	Oakwood (10)	3–4	Welling Town (9)	30
171	Loxwood (9)	1–0	Faversham Strike Force (10)	41
172	K Sports (9)	0–5	Beckenham Town (9)	49
173	Stansfeld (10)	3–1	Bagshot (10)	45
174	Horndean (9)	9–0	Hamble Club (9)	63
175	Wick (10)	0–0 (1–4 p)	Alton (9)	31
176	Radstock Town (10)	0–1	Arundel (10)	70
177	Westbury United (9)	1–4	Alresford Town (9)	58
178	AFC Stoneham (9)	4–0	Portland United (9)	59
179	Folland Sports (10)	0–1	Corsham Town (9)	60
180	Millbrook (10)	0–2	Shaftesbury (9)	76
181	Cowes Sports (9)	3–4	Bournemouth (9)	122
182	Amesbury Town (9)	1–4	Andover New Street (10)	62
183	Baffins Milton Rovers (9)	1–3	Andover Town (10)	105
184	Selsey (10)	0–1	Pagham (9)	166
185	Bradford Town (9)	3–0	Wincanton Town (10)	84
186	Calne Town (9)	1–4	Whitchurch United (10)	94
187	Sherborne Town (10)	5–3	Verwood Town (10)	78
188	Moneyfields (9)	4–0	Totton & Eling (10)	86
189	Ash United (10)	2–0	Hythe & Dibden (9)	50
190	Devizes Town (10)	0–10	Badshot Lea (9)	92
191	Petersfield Town (10)	0–3	Bashley (9)	113
192	Farnham Town (9)	4–0	Warminster Town (10)	71
193	AFC Portchester (9)	4–0	Romsey Town (10)	177
194	Ringwood Town (10)	2–0	Bridport (9)	44
195	Godolphin Atlantic (10)	1–3	Bovey Tracey (10)	25
196	Saltash United (9)	3–1	Cullompton Rangers (10)	88
197	Exmouth Town (9)	0–1	Shepton Mallet (9)	244
198	Torpoint Athletic (10)	1–0	Callington Town (10)	96
199	Wadebridge Town (10)	2–1	AFC St Austell (10)	131
200	Bodmin Town (10)	3–3 (5–3 p)	Crediton United (10)	65
201	Ilfracombe Town (9)	0–2	Bishop Sutton (10)	78
202	Elburton Villa (10)	0–4	Welton Rovers (10)	52
203	Torrington (10)	1–1 (2–3 p)	Bishops Lydeard (10)	39
108	Chalvey Sports (10)	0–2	Rothwell Corinthians (9)	62
154	Greenways (10)	2–2 (5–4 p)	Lydd Town (10)	37
Sunday, 12 September 2021
169	Tooting Bec (10)	0–3	Jersey Bulls (9)	163
40	Worsbrough Bridge Athletic (10)	1–2	Maine Road (10)	226
45	Dudley Town (10)	2–0	Alsager Town (10)	196
85	UEA (10)	1–2	Swaffham Town (9)	133
93	Coggeshall United (10)	1–3	Glebe (9)	49
100	Hackney Wick (10)	1–4	New Salamis (9)	47
112	Irchester United (10)	1–5	Hillingdon Borough (10)	67
Tuesday, 14 September 2021
69	Melton Town (9)	3–0	West Bridgford (10)	85
Match played at West Bridgford.
84	Walsham-le-Willows (9)	5–2	March Town United (9)	100

== Second qualifying round ==
The draw was also made on 9 July 2021.

Tie	Home team (tier)	Score	Away team (tier)	Att.
Thursday, 23 September 2021
63	Quorn (9)	2–1	Leicester Nirvana (9)	127
Friday, 24 September 2021
102	Bedfont & Feltham (10)	0–0 (6–7 p)	Rayners Lane (10)	103
120	Longwell Green Sports (10)	0–2	Cadbury Heath (9)	82
20	Daisy Hill (10)	0–4	Atherton LR (10)	168
62	Pinchbeck United (9)	1–2	Graham Street Prims (10)	87
68	Ely City (9)	0–1	Mildenhall Town (9)	141
90	New Salamis (9)	3–2	Takeley (9)	49
94	Winslow United (10)	2–3	Shefford Town & Campton (10)	106
Saturday, 25 September 2021
118	Eversley & California (10)	1–2	Oldland Abbotonians (10)	48
25	FC Isle of Man (10)	3–1	Avro (9)	75
Match played at Avro.
129	AFC Varndeanians (9)	0–5	Kent Football United (10)	16
134	Meridian VP (10)	1–5	Shoreham (10)	22
1	Blyth Town (10)	1–8	West Allotment Celtic (9)	209
2	Birtley Town (10)	4–1	Knaresborough Town (9)	105
3	Redcar Town (10)	2–0	Billingham Town (9)	160
4	Thackley (9)	2–3	Holker Old Boys (10)	96
5	Eccleshill United (9)	2–0	Bishop Auckland (9)	98
6	Northallerton Town (9)	1–2	Penrith (9)	132
7	Cleator Moor Celtic (10)	3–2	Harrogate Railway Athletic (10)	72
8	North Shields (9)	0–0 (5–3 p)	Whickham (9)	364
9	Garforth Town (9)	4–0	Garstang (10)	164
10	Chester-le-Street Town (10)	2–0	Easington Colliery (10)	106
11	Barnoldswick Town (9)	1–2	Heaton Stannington (10)	366
12	Carlisle City (10)	4–1	Esh Winning (10)	93
13	Willington (10)	1–3	Thornaby (9)	102
14	Newton Aycliffe (9)	w/o	Boro Rangers (10)	NA
Walkover for Newton Aycliffe – Boro Rangers not accepted into the competition
15	Billingham Synthonia (10)	3–1	Brandon United (10)	98
17	Maltby Main (9)	2–2 (3–4 p)	Bury AFC (10)	387
18	West Didsbury & Chorlton (10)	0–1	Parkgate (10)	483
19	Lower Breck (9)	5–0	Swallownest (10)	85
Lower Breck removed from competition for fielding an ineligible player.
21	Bacup Borough (10)	3–3 (2–4 p)	Wythenshawe Town (9)	124
22	Rossington Main (10)	0–3	Skelmersdale United (9)	112
23	Golcar United (10)	4–0	Wythenshawe Amateurs (10)	245
24	Winterton Rangers (9)	2–0	Selby Town (10)	146
26	Emley AFC (9)	1–1 (6–5 p)	Chadderton (10)	182
27	Grimsby Borough (9)	3–1	Cheadle Heath Nomads (10)	70
28	Abbey Hey (10)	5–2	Hall Road Rangers (10)	72
29	New Mills (10)	2–5	AFC Liverpool (9)	120
30	Goole AFC (9)	4–0	Maine Road (10)	140
31	Burscough (9)	2–0	Irlam (9)	96
32	South Liverpool (10)	4–1	Dronfield Town (10)	108
33	Prestwich Heys (9)	7–2	Brigg Town (10)	186
34	Staveley MW (9)	1–1 (3–5 p)	Barton Town (9)	165
35	Runcorn Town (9)	1–4	Pilkington (10)	89
36	Heath Hayes (10)	2–3	Highgate United (9)	83
37	Stafford Town (10)	0–2	Studley (10)	65
38	Lichfield City (9)	4–0	Uttoxeter Town (9)	139
39	Ashby Ivanhoe (10)	0–1	Romulus (9)	102
40	Worcester Raiders (10)	1–2	Atherstone Town (10)	355
41	Sandbach United (10)	2–2 (3–1 p)	Dudley Town (10)	159
42	Wolverhampton Casuals (9)	4–1	Ellesmere Rangers (10)	68
43	AFC Bridgnorth (10)	2–2 (4–3 p)	Lye Town (9)	85
44	Wednesfield (10)	2–0	Hereford Pegasus (10)	24
45	Racing Club Warwick (9)	4–1	Chelmsley Town (10)	118
46	Heather St John's (9)	3–1	Darlaston Town (1874) (10)	46
47	Nuneaton Griff (10)	0–3	Bewdley Town (9)	49
48	Whitchurch Alport (9)	2–1	Pershore Town (10)	114
49	Rugby Town (9)	1–0	AFC Wulfrunians (9)	167
50	Worcester City (9)	3–1	Bilston Town (10)	266
51	Winsford United (9)	1–3	Gresley Rovers (9)	205
52	Boldmere St Michaels (9)	3–3 (3–2 p)	Shifnal Town (9)	104
53	Hinckley LR (9)	1–0	Hinckley AFC (10)	242
54	Gedling MW (10)	1–3	Kimberley MW (10)	80
55	Birstall United (10)	5–2	St Andrews (10)	79
56	Deeping Rangers (9)	4–0	Dunkirk (10)	119
57	Harborough Town (9)	2–0	Sherwood Colliery (9)	131
58	Ingles (10)	0–2	Harrowby United (10)	50
59	Heanor Town (9)	0–2	Eastwood Community (9)	170
60	Lutterworth Town (9)	5–1	Skegness Town (9)	40
61	Boston Town (9)	2–0	Holbeach United (9)	62
64	Belper United (10)	4–1	Selston (9)	143
65	GNG Oadby Town (9)	2–3	Loughborough University (9)	60
66	Melton Town (9)	1–4	Aylestone Park (10)	115
Match played at Holwell Sports F.C.
67	Shirebrook Town (10)	0–1	Sleaford Town (9)	84
69	Swaffham Town (9)	0–3	Eynesbury Rovers (9)	79
70	Sheringham (10)	0–4	Thetford Town (9)	72
71	Whittlesey Athletic (10)	3–2	Framlingham Town (10)	137
72	Great Yarmouth Town (10)	1–0	Walsham-le-Willows (9)	90
73	Kirkley & Pakefield (9)	3–0	Debenham LC (10)	63
74	Newmarket Town (9)	6–2	Diss Town (10)	87
75	Wroxham (9)	4–0	Godmanchester Rovers (9)	130
76	Lakenheath (9)	3–0	Downham Town (10)	71
78	Redbridge (9)	3–0	Hadleigh United (9)	58
79	Saffron Walden Town (9)	3–0	Southend Manor (9)	229
80	May & Baker (10)	0–5	Glebe (9)	25
81	Hoddesdon Town (9)	4–3	Woodford Town (9)	85
82	Sawbridgeworth Town (9)	1–3	Cockfosters (9)	46
83	White Ensign (9)	1–2	Ipswich Wanderers (10)	79
84	Potton United (9)	1–1 (2–3 p)	Baldock Town (9)	137
85	Stansted (9)	2–2 (3–2 p)	West Essex (9)	53

Tie	Home team (tier)	Score	Away team (tier)	Att.
86	Wivenhoe Town (10)	2–1	Stanway Rovers (9)	138
87	Whitton United (9)	5–1	Wormley Rovers (10)	31
89	Cornard United (10)	3–2	Barkingside (10)	35
91	Langford (10)	1–4	Ilford (9)	61
92	Burnham Ramblers (10)	3–4	Long Melford (9)	45
93	Haverhill Rovers (9)	2–2 (4–5 p)	London Lions (10)	70
95	Northampton Sileby Rangers (10)	3–4	Buckingham Athletic (10)	47
96	AFC Hayes (10)	0–3	Risborough Rangers (9)	91
97	Wembley (9)	0–0 (4–5 p)	Holmer Green (9)	47
98	FC Deportivo Galicia (10)	1–4	Tring Athletic (9)	39
99	Egham Town (9)	3–2	Northampton ON Chenecks (9)	53
101	Hillingdon Borough (10)	1–1 (5–3 p)	Bugbrooke St Michaels (9)	50
103	Southall (9)	5–1	CB Hounslow United (9)	47
104	British Airways (10)	3–1	Desborough Town (9)	30
105	Burnham (9)	3–0	Aylesbury Vale Dynamos (9)	89
106	Wellingborough Whitworth (10)	5–1	Windsor (9)	65
107	Ardley United (9)	5–0	Rothwell Corinthians (9)	35
108	Newport Pagnell Town (9)	1–0	Harpenden Town (9)	141
109	Penn & Tylers Green (10)	1–1 (3–4 p)	Harefield United (9)	37
110	Easington Sports (9)	0–2	London Colney (9)	63
111	Frimley Green (9)	3–1	AFC Aldermaston (10)	50
112	Tadley Calleva (9)	1–4	Ascot United (9)	72
113	Bitton (9)	3–1	Cheltenham Saracens (10)	44
114	Abingdon United (10)	1–10	Berks County (10)	44
115	Brislington (9)	1–2	Ashton & Backwell United (9)	70
116	Tuffley Rovers (9)	3–2	Fleet Spurs (10)	82
117	Bishop's Cleeve (9)	4–4 (3–4 p)	Wallingford Town (10)	103
119	Bristol Telephones (10)	1–6	Chipping Sodbury Town (9)	23
121	Sheerwater (9)	1–0	Tytherington Rocks (10)	64
122	Wokingham & Emmbrook (9)	1–1 (5–4 p)	Hallen (9)	110
123	Keynsham Town (9)	4–1	Long Crendon (10)	78
124	Cribbs (9)	1–1 (5–4 p)	Shortwood United (10)	69
125	Milton United (10)	6–0	Woodley United (10)	62
127	Portishead Town (10)	1–3	Royal Wootton Bassett Town (9)	67
128	Raynes Park Vale (9)	4–0	Welling Town (9)	65
130	Tunbridge Wells (9)	4–1	Canterbury City (9)	213
131	Epsom & Ewell (10)	4–0	Mile Oak (10)	56
132	Holmesdale (9)	4–0	AFC Croydon Athletic (10)	55
133	Alfold (9)	2–2 (3–4 p)	Redhill (9)	85
135	Fisher (9)	w/o	Little Common (9)	NA
Fisher awarded a walkover due to Little Common players and staff testing positive for COVID-19, forcing them to forfeit.
136	Rochester United (10)	1–1 (7–6 p)	Chessington & Hook United (10)	107
137	Snodland Town (10)	4–1	Sutton Athletic (10)	89
138	Abbey Rangers (9)	4–2	Montpelier Villa (10)	25
140	Hassocks (9)	1–2	Beckenham Town (9)	90
141	Lordswood (9)	1–1 (4–2 p)	Seaford Town (10)	50
142	Croydon (10)	1–4	Horley Town (9)	98
143	Erith Town (9)	2–3	Sheppey United (9)	87
144	Saltdean United (9)	1–3	Bridon Ropes (10)	76
145	Colliers Wood United (9)	1–0	Punjab United (9)	51
146	Tower Hamlets (9)	1–3	Crawley Down Gatwick (9)	10
147	Hailsham Town (10)	1–2	Staplehurst Monarchs (10)	97
148	Greenways (10)	2–3	Forest Hill Park (10)	27
149	Athletic Newham (9)	2–2 (7–6 p)	Bexhill United (9)	36
150	Loxwood (9)	0–5	Erith & Belvedere (9)	58
151	Worthing United (10)	1–5	Stansfeld (10)	65
152	Midhurst & Easebourne (10)	0–1	Alresford Town (9)	87
153	Ringwood Town (10)	1–2	Downton (10)	82
154	Moneyfields (9)	2–0	AFC Portchester (9)	162
155	Laverstock & Ford (10)	4–0	Fawley (10)	102
156	Whitchurch United (10)	2–2 (3–5 p)	Ash United (10)	96
157	Godalming Town (10)	2–2 (4–5 p)	Badshot Lea (9)	124
158	Sherborne Town (10)	3–6	Bemerton Heath (10)	84
159	Horndean (9)	1–1 (1–4 p)	Brockenhurst (9)	84
160	Bournemouth (9)	5–3	East Cowes Victoria Athletic (10)	76
161	Alton (9)	2–2 (3–5 p)	Pagham (9)	153
162	Andover Town (10)	1–4	Andover New Street (10)	279
163	AFC Stoneham (9)	2–3	Blackfield & Langley (9)	53
164	Arundel (10)	0–5	Shaftesbury (9)	60
165	Bradford Town (9)	2–0	Odd Down (10)	107
166	Corsham Town (9)	1–1 (2–4 p)	Hamworthy United (9)	99
167	Farnham Town (9)	1–1 (6–7 p)	Bashley (9)	104
168	Wendron United (10)	2–1	Bishop Sutton (10)	105
169	St Blazey (10)	2–2 (5–6 p)	Dobwalls (10)	167
170	Wadebridge Town (10)	1–4	Newquay (10)	103
171	Elmore (10)	1–5	Helston Athletic (9)	100
172	Shepton Mallet (9)	0–1	Mousehole (9)	208
173	Launceston (10)	1–2	Newton Abbot Spurs (10)	51
174	Sidmouth Town (10)	2–10	Welton Rovers (10)	52
175	Bovey Tracey (10)	4–6	Street (9)	48
176	Porthleven (10)	w/o	Liskeard Athletic (10)	NA
Liskeard Athletic awarded a walkover due to Porthleven resigning from the South West Peninsula League.
177	Bishops Lydeard (10)	2–2 (2–4 p)	Wellington AFC (9)	85
178	Camelford (10)	3–2	Cheddar (10)	65
179	Saltash United (9)	2–2 (5–4 p)	Bodmin Town (10)	153
Saltash United removed from competition for fielding an ineligible player.
180	Axminster Town (10)	0–1	Brixham (10)	98
181	Torpoint Athletic (10)	6–1	Stoke Gabriel (10)	65
182	Ivybridge Town (10)	1–2	Wells City (10)	75
Sunday, 26 September 2021
16	Albion Sports (9)	1–8	Newcastle Benfield (9)	123
77	Newbury Forest (10)	1–7	Buckhurst Hill (10)	113
88	Benfleet (10)	6–1	Holland (10)	62
100	Hilltop (10)	3–1	Broadfields United (9)	197
126	Sandhurst Town (10)	1–3	Longlevens (9)	70
139	Jersey Bulls (9)	5–0	Crowborough Athletic (9)	778

== First round proper ==
The draw was made on 27 September 2021.

Tie	Home team (tier)	Score	Away team (tier)	Att.
Friday, 22 October 2021
24	Newark (9)	1–1 (1–3 p)	Deeping Rangers (9)	125
64	Southall (9)	3–0	Erith & Belvedere (9)	124
Saturday, 23 October 2021
65	Fareham Town (9)	1–1 (4–3 p)	Jersey Bulls (9)	273
1	Carlisle City (10)	5–1	Chester-le-Street Town (10)	142
2	Pilkington (10)	7–3	West Allotment Celtic (9)	96
3	Heaton Stannington (10)	2–5	Eccleshill United (9)	619
4	Seaham Red Star (9)	0–0 (3–4 p)	Wythenshawe Town (9)	111
5	Newcastle Benfield (9)	3–2	Golcar United (10)	168
6	Abbey Hey (10)	6–0	Parkgate (10)	118
7	Prestwich Heys (9)	4–2	Penrith (9)	179
8	Swallownest (10)	1–3	Birtley Town (10)	105
9	Emley AFC (9)	4–1	Longridge Town (9)	236
11	Ryhope Colliery Welfare (9)	1–2	Bury AFC (10)	260
13	Holker Old Boys (10)	3–1	Skelmersdale United (9)	134
14	Barton Town (9)	3–1	Cleator Moor Celtic (10)	203
15	Thornaby (9)	4–0	South Liverpool (10)	174
16	Consett AFC (9)	2–1	Atherton LR (10)	357
17	Grimsby Borough (9)	1–1 (1–4 p)	Redcar Town (10)	107
18	Vauxhall Motors (9)	1–2	North Shields (9)	182
19	Winterton Rangers (9)	5–1	Goole AFC (9)	123
20	Burscough (9)	1–1 (6–5 p)	Garforth Town (9)	105
21	Bewdley Town (9)	1–3	Racing Club Warwick (9)	94
22	Wellingborough Whitworth (10)	1–6	Highgate United (9)	81
23	Heather St John's (9)	1–2	Atherstone Town (10)	218
25	Gresley Rovers (9)	7–2	Harrowby United (10)	257
26	Quorn (9)	0–4	Hinckley LR (9)	198
27	Eynesbury Rovers (9)	1–2	Sandbach United (10)	143
28	Kimberley MW (10)	3–2	Studley (10)	67
29	Boston Town (9)	0–1	Hanley Town (9)	67
31	Radford (10)	1–2	Boldmere St Michaels (9)	78
32	Worcester City (9)	2–1	Lutterworth Town (9)	355
33	Romulus (9)	1–1 (4–5 p)	Harborough Town (9)	75
34	Whittlesey Athletic (10)	1–0	Wolverhampton Casuals (9)	127
35	Whitchurch Alport (9)	2–1	Sleaford Town (9)	134
37	Graham Street Prims (10)	0–4	Lichfield City (9)	99
38	Coventry Sphinx (9)	9–0	AFC Bridgnorth (10)	31
39	Eastwood Community (9)	1–1 (2–4 p)	Loughborough University (9)	87
40	Aylestone Park (10)	4–0	Wednesfield (10)	100
41	Whitton United (9)	2–4	Cockfosters (9)	32
42	Mildenhall Town (9)	1–2	Lakenheath (9)	277
43	Saffron Walden Town (9)	3–1	Kirkley & Pakefield (9)	259
44	Stansted (9)	1–1 (4–1 p)	Wivenhoe Town (10)	84
45	Wroxham (9)	6–0	Benfleet (10)	141
46	Ipswich Wanderers (10)	2–0	Milton Keynes Irish (9)	97
47	Buckingham Athletic (10)	2–2 (2–4 p)	Cornard United (10)	95
48	Ilford (9)	0–1	Shefford Town & Campton (10)	60
49	Norwich United (9)	1–2	New Salamis (9)	127
50	London Colney (9)	0–1	Newport Pagnell Town (9)	50
51	Ampthill Town (10)	0–4	Norwich CBS (10)	127
52	Ardley United (9)	1–1 (3–4 p)	Tring Athletic (9)	84
53	Hoddesdon Town (9)	0–0 (4–5 p)	Gorleston (9)	119
54	Great Yarmouth Town (10)	1–5	Buckhurst Hill (10)	128

Tie	Home team (tier)	Score	Away team (tier)	Att.
55	Risborough Rangers (9)	3–1	Long Melford (9)	115
57	Holmer Green (9)	1–3	Glebe (9)	59
58	Newmarket Town (9)	2–1	Redbridge (9)	151
59	London Lions (10)	4–2	Thetford Town (9)	79
60	North Greenford United (9)	3–2	Ash United (10)	60
61	Fisher (9)	1–2	Badshot Lea (9)	162
62	Rayners Lane (10)	2–3	Sheerwater (9)	64
63	Hilltop (10)	2–3	Tunbridge Wells (9)	120
66	Abbey Rangers (9)	2–2 (4–2 p)	Horley Town (9)	62
67	Littlehampton Town (9)	3–2	Moneyfields (9)	202
68	British Airways (10)	4–0	Epsom & Ewell (10)	40
69	Clapton (9)	0–2	Beckenham Town (9)	39
70	Pagham (9)	1–1 (4–2 p)	Snodland Town (10)	104
71	Wallingford Town (10)	2–2 (6–5 p)	Ascot United (9)	240
72	Stansfeld (10)	3–1	Staplehurst Monarchs (10)	81
73	Blackfield & Langley (9)	4–2	Wokingham & Emmbrook (9)	83
74	Sheppey United (9)	4–0	Forest Hill Park (10)	289
75	Chatham Town (9)	6–0	Alresford Town (9)	388
76	Holmesdale (9)	1–1 (5–6 p)	Athletic Newham (9)	49
77	Milton United (10)	2–1	Bridon Ropes (10)	79
78	Harefield United (9)	3–0	Kent Football United (10)	70
79	Guildford City (9)	4–0	Shoreham (10)	74
80	Deal Town (9)	4–0	Kennington (9)	423
81	Frimley Green (9)	2–1	Rochester United (10)	93
82	Berks County (10)	2–1	Burnham (9)	63
83	Crawley Down Gatwick (9)	3–2	Lordswood (9)	103
84	Egham Town (9)	4–1	Colliers Wood United (9)	84
85	Raynes Park Vale (9)	2–0	Redhill (9)	107
86	Dobwalls (10)	0–3	Bashley (9)	79
87	Royal Wootton Bassett Town (9)	4–0	Downton (10)	148
88	Wendron United (10)	4–2	Bournemouth (9)	118
89	Buckland Athletic (9)	3–0	Camelford (10)	125
90	Newton Abbot Spurs (10)	1–2	Brixham (10)	164
91	Tuffley Rovers (9)	1–4	Street (9)	70
92	Cribbs (9)	1–2	Andover New Street (10)	105
93	Liskeard Athletic (10)	4–2	Laverstock & Ford (10)	112
94	Bitton (9)	2–4	New Milton Town (10)	53
95	Oldland Abbotonians (10)	2–2 (5–3 p)	Helston Athletic (9)	55
96	Brimscombe & Thrupp (9)	2–1	Welton Rovers (10)	84
97	Mousehole (9)	4–0	Wells City (10)	118
98	Brockenhurst (9)	6–0	Bodmin Town (10)	204
99	Longlevens (9)	0–3	Shaftesbury (9)	86
100	Newquay (10)	2–3	Keynsham Town (9)	200
101	Millbrook AFC (9)	1–2	Wellington AFC (9)	60
102	Ashton & Backwell United (9)	0–0 (4–5 p)	Bemerton Heath (10)	119
103	Falmouth Town (10)	2–1	Bradford Town (9)	570
104	Torpoint Athletic (10)	4–1	Chipping Sodbury Town (9)	100
105	Cadbury Heath (9)	1–1 (5–6 p)	Hamworthy United (9)	65
12	Billingham Synthonia (10)	4–2	FC Isle of Man (10)	150
Sunday, 24 October 2021
36	Coventry United (9)	2–1	Birstall United (10)	271
10	AFC Liverpool (9)	2–1	Newton Aycliffe (9)	127
30	Belper United (10)	1–2	Rugby Town (9)	177
56	Baldock Town (9)	5–1	Hillingdon Borough (10)	104

== Second round proper ==
The draw was made on 25 October 2021 featuring the 105 winners from the previous round with an additional 23 teams joining.

Tie	Home team (tier)	Score	Away team (tier)	Att.
Friday, 19 November 2021
59	Brixham (10)	1–5	Tavistock (9)	155
Tavistock removed from competition for fielding an ineligible player.
Saturday, 20 November 2021
1	Pilkington (10)	3–1	Burscough (9)	118
2	AFC Liverpool (9)	2–0	Redcar Town (10)	147
3	Eccleshill United (9)	2–3	Barton Town (9)	89
4	Newcastle Benfield (9)	2–0	Emley AFC (9)	182
5	Carlisle City (10)	0–1	Abbey Hey (10)	220
6	North Shields (9)	2–2 (6–5 p)	North Ferriby (10)	410
8	Holker Old Boys (10)	0–3	Wythenshawe Town (9)	81
9	Billingham Synthonia (10)	2–1	West Auckland Town (9)	130
10	Thornaby (9)	1–1 (3–4 p)	Consett (9)	228
11	Prestwich Heys (9)	3–1	Winterton Rangers (9)	206
12	Sandbach United (10)	1–0	Hanley Town (9)	160
13	Lichfield City (9)	3–0	Highgate United (9)	206
14	Stourport Swifts (9)	3–1	Kimberley MW (10)	142
15	Atherstone Town (10)	3–1	Long Eaton United (9)	424
16	Rugby Town (9)	1–0	Hinckley LR (9)	194
17	Loughborough Students (9)	2–0	Gresley Rovers (9)	464
18	Racing Club Warwick (9)	1–3	Coventry Sphinx (9)	306
19	Aylestone Park (10)	1–5	Anstey Nomads (9)	161
20	Boldmere St. Michaels (9)	1–1 (2–4 p)	Congleton Town (9)	116
21	Whitchurch Alport (9)	1–1 (5–3 p)	Malvern Town (9)	239
22	Coventry United (9)	1–1 (5–4 p)	Westfields (9)	115
23	Harborough Town (9)	2–0	Wellingborough Town (9)	246
24	Whittlesey Athletic (10)	0–0 (7–6 p)	Worcester City (9)	314
25	Walsall Wood (9)	2–0	Deeping Rangers (9)	30
26	Mulbarton Wanderers (9)	1–2	London Lions (10)	76
27	Shefford Town & Campton (10)	1–1 (5–4 p)	Risborough Rangers (9)	292
28	Cockfosters (9)	0–4	Tring Athletic (9)	186
29	Saffron Walden Town (9)	5–1	Cornard United (10)	284
30	Fakenham Town (9)	1–1 (4–2 p)	Stansted (9)	148
32	New Salamis (9)	2–0	Ipswich Wanderers (10)	35

Tie	Home team (tier)	Score	Away team (tier)	Att.
33	Norwich CBS (10)	0–3	Lakenheath (9)	70
34	Newport Pagnell Town (9)	1–1 (2–1 p)	Leighton Town (9)	526
35	Gorleston (9)	2–3	Buckhurst Hill (10)	165
36	Wroxham (9)	1–1 (6–5 p)	Newmarket Town (9)	145
37	Glebe (9)	1–1 (5–3 p)	Hanworth Villa (9)	65
38	Deal Town (9)	1–2	Littlehampton Town (9)	407
39	Crawley Down Gatwick (9)	3–0	British Airways (10)	90
40	Flackwell Heath (9)	0–1	Guildford City (9)	167
41	Raynes Park Vale (9)	6–2	Blackfield & Langley (9)	102
42	Fareham Town (9)	3–5	Abbey Rangers (9)	256
43	Milton United (10)	2–3	Beckenham Town (9)	87
44	Cobham (9)	0–3	Egham Town (9)	44
45	Frimley Green (9)	5–1	United Services Portsmouth (9)	65
47	Tunbridge Wells (9)	1–0	Walton & Hersham (9)	329
48	Southall (9)	2–2 (3–1 p)	Chatham Town (9)	108
49	Wallingford Town (10)	1–0	North Greenford United (9)	285
50	Harefield United (9)	2–3	Berks County (10)	150
51	Sheerwater (9)	2–3	Sheppey United (9)	148
52	Athletic Newham (9)	5–3	Pagham (9)	18
53	Wellington AFC (9)	5–2	Christchurch (9)	51
54	Buckland Athletic (9)	3–1	Falmouth Town (10)	302
55	Wendron United (10)	3–6	New Milton Town (10)	112
56	Andover New Street (10)	1–2	Hamworthy United (9)	187
57	Liskeard Athletic (10)	2–3	Keynsham Town (9)	148
58	Royal Wootton Bassett Town (9)	2–0	Torpoint Athletic (10)	293
60	Bemerton Heath (10)	1–4	Clevedon Town (9)	103
61	Bashley (9)	2–2 (6–5 p)	Shaftesbury (9)	230
62	Street (9)	1–1 (5–4 p)	Oldland Abbotonians (10)	175
63	Bridgwater United (9)	1–0	Mousehole (9)	327
64	Brockenhurst (9)	4–1	Brimscombe & Thrupp (9)	224
Sunday, 21 November 2021
7	Bury AFC (10)	3–1	Birtley Town (10)	1,019
31	Baldock Town (9)	2–2 (4–5 p)	Hadley (9)	105
46	Stansfeld (10)	2–1	Badshot Lea (9)	177

== Third round proper ==
The draw was made on 22 November 2021.

Tie	Home team (tier)	Score	Away team (tier)	Att.
Saturday, 11 December 2021
2	Abbey Hey (10)	4–1	Bury AFC (10)	650
3	Newcastle Benfield (9)	0–4	Consett (9)	351
4	Barton Town (9)	2–3	North Shields (9)	520
5	Wythenshawe Town (9)	3–0	Billingham Synthonia (10)	182
6	Stourport Swifts (9)	2–2 (4–5 p)	Rugby Town (9)	123
7	Loughborough Students (9)	4–0	Sandbach United (10)	301
8	Atherstone Town (10)	1–3	Whitchurch Alport (9)	395
9	Coventry Sphinx (9)	1–0	Coventry United (9)	185
10	Prestwich Heys (9)	P–P	Harborough Town (9)	NA
11	Highgate United (9)	0–4	Congleton Town (9)	81
12	Walsall Wood (9)	P–P	Anstey Nomads (9)	NA
13	Whittlesey Athletic (10)	0–6	Newport Pagnell Town (9)	359
14	Tring Athletic (9)	0–1	Saffron Walden Town (9)	114
15	London Lions (10)	2–0	New Salamis (9)	104
16	Buckhurst Hill (10)	2–3	Wroxham (9)	231
17	Lakenheath (9)	3–2	Shefford Town & Campton (10)	131
18	Fakenham Town (9)	3–1	Hadley (9)	166
19	Tunbridge Wells (9)	4–2	Wallingford Town (10)	336

Tie	Home team (tier)	Score	Away team (tier)	Att.
20	Glebe (9)	0–0 (4–3 p)	Beckenham Town (9)	175
21	Abbey Rangers (9)	1–1 (2–4 p)	Athletic Newham (9)	57
24	Crawley Down Gatwick (9)	0–4	Raynes Park Vale (9)	104
25	Littlehampton Town (9)	1–0	Sheppey United (9)	275
26	Guildford City (9)	0–0 (3–4 p)	Southall (9)	130
27	New Milton Town (10)	0–0 (4–3 p)	Keynsham Town (9)	183
28	Bridgwater United (9)	2–1	Bashley (9)	239
29	Street (9)	1–1 (2–3 p)	Brockenhurst (9)	160
30	Buckland Athletic (9)	2–0	Wellington AFC (9)	152
31	Royal Wootton Bassett Town (9)	1–3	Hamworthy United (9)	201
32	Brixham (10)	0–6	Clevedon Town (9)	81
Sunday, 12 December 2021
1	AFC Liverpool (9)	1–0	Pilkington (10)	142
23	Berks County (10)	1–2	Egham Town (9)	179
22	Stansfeld (10)	3–1	Frimley Green (9)	232
Saturday, 18 December 2021
10	Prestwich Heys (9)	1–7	Harborough Town (9)	222
12	Walsall Wood (9)	1–1 (4–2 p)	Anstey Nomads (9)	70
Tie awarded to Anstey Nomads.

== Fourth round proper ==
The draw was made on 13 December 2021.

Tie	Home team (tier)	Score	Away team (tier)	Att.
Saturday, 15 January 2022
1	Consett (9)	1–2	Wythenshawe Town (9)	585
2	Abbey Hey (10)	2–2 (6–5 p)	AFC Liverpool (9)	270
3	Harborough Town (9)	1–1 (3–5 p)	North Shields (9)	1,014
4	Whitchurch Alport (9)	2–1	Congleton Town (9)	457
6	Rugby Town (9)	5–1	Lakenheath (9)	434
7	Saffron Walden Town (9)	1–1 (5–6 p)	Loughborough Students (9)	760
8	Coventry Sphinx (9)	6–0	London Lions (10)	115
9	Newport Pagnell Town (9)	3–1	Fakenham Town (9)	616

Tie	Home team (tier)	Score	Away team (tier)	Att.
10	Brockenhurst (9)	2–0	New Milton Town (10)	857
11	Bridgwater United (9)	2–2 (3–5 p)	Tunbridge Wells (9)	336
12	Hamworthy United (9)	3–2	Glebe (9)	214
13	Athletic Newham (9)	5–0	Littlehampton Town (9)	152
Athletic Newham removed from competition for fielding an ineligible player.
14	Buckland Athletic (9)	2–1	Egham Town (9)	312
15	Southall (9)	1–1 (5–4 p)	Clevedon Town (9)	98
16	Raynes Park Vale (9)	1–2	Stansfeld (10)	580
Saturday, 22 January 2022
5	Wroxham (9)	2–5	Anstey Nomads (9)	242

== Fifth round proper ==
The draw was made on 17 January 2022.

Tie	Home team (tier)	Score	Away team (tier)	Att.
Saturday, 12 February 2022
1	Coventry Sphinx (9)	3–3 (3–4 p)	Whitchurch Alport (9)	338
2	North Shields (9)	2–0	Rugby Town (9)	1,039
3	Loughborough Students (9)	3–0	Abbey Hey (10)	873
4	Anstey Nomads (9)	1–1 (2–3 p)	Wythenshawe Town (9)	430
5	Southall (9)	0–0 (4–2 p)	Stansfeld (10)	245
6	Hamworthy United (9)	3–1	Tunbridge Wells (9)	661
7	Littlehampton Town (9)	3–3 (4–1 p)	Brockenhurst (9)	1,276
8	Newport Pagnell Town (9)	1–1 (4–3 p)	Buckland Athletic (9)	1,186

== Quarter-finals ==
The draw for the quarter-finals was made on 14 February 2022.

Tie	Home team (tier)	Score	Away team (tier)	Att.
Saturday, 12 March 2022
1	Whitchurch Alport (9)	1–2	Newport Pagnell Town (9)	1,200
2	Loughborough Students (9)	2–0	Wythenshawe Town (9)	1,081
3	Littlehampton Town (9)	1–0	North Shields (9)	2,245
4	Hamworthy United (9)	1–1 (7–6 p)	Southall (9)	783

== Semi-finals ==
The draw for the semi-finals was made on 14 March 2022.

2 April 2022
15:00

Littlehampton Town (9)	4–0	Loughborough Students (9)
Gaskin 1', 79'; Clark 35'; Wiggans 56'	Report

The Sportsfield, Littlehampton
Attendance: 3,142

2 April 2022
15:00

Newport Pagnell Town (9)	1–1	Hamworthy United (9)
Ahmed	Report	Munn
Penalties
Sage (penalty scored)	6–5	Penalty scored Penalty missed

Willen Road, Newport Pagnell
Attendance: 1,858

== Final ==
22 May 2022
12:15

Littlehampton Town (9)	0–3	Newport Pagnell Town (9)
		Barnes 19'; Shepherd 55', 63'

Wembley Stadium, London
