= 2023–24 Northern Premier League =

The 2023–24 season was the 56th season of the Northern Premier League. The league consists of four divisions, the Premier Division at Step 3 of the National League System, and the West, East and Midlands divisions at Step 4.

== Premier Division ==
Northern Premier League Premier Division
- Season: 2023–24
- Champions: Radcliffe
- Promoted: Radcliffe; Marine
- Relegated: Atherton Collieries; Bradford (Park Avenue); Stafford Rangers; Marske United (resigned)

=== Team changes ===
The following 6 clubs left the Premier Division before the season:

- Belper Town – relegated to Division One East
- Liversedge – relegated to Division One East
- Nantwich Town – relegated to Division One West
- South Shields – promoted to the National League North
- Stalybridge Celtic – relegated to Division One West
- Warrington Town – promoted to the National League North

The following 6 clubs joined the division before the season:

- Basford United - transferred from the Southern League Premier Division Central
- Bradford (Park Avenue) – relegated from the National League North
- Ilkeston Town – transferred from the Southern League Premier Division Central
- Macclesfield – promoted from the Division One West
- Workington – promoted from Division One West
- Worksop Town – promoted from the Division One East

=== Premier Division table ===
Pos	Team	Pld	W	D	L	GF	GA	GD	Pts	Promotion, qualification or relegation
1	Radcliffe (C, P)	40	28	3	9	103	58	+45	87	Promotion to the National League North
2	Macclesfield	40	24	5	11	84	47	+37	77	Qualification for the play-offs (Note: Four teams play for one spot and promotion to the National League North)
3	Marine (O, P)	40	23	7	10	87	44	+43	76	Qualification for the play-offs
4	Warrington Rylands 1906	40	21	12	7	65	42	+23	75	Qualification for the play-offs
5	Worksop Town	40	21	7	12	72	49	+23	70	Qualification for the play-offs
6	Hyde United	40	19	10	11	68	48	+20	67	
7	Ashton United	40	19	10	11	73	63	+10	67	
8	Gainsborough Trinity	40	19	6	15	66	63	+3	63	
9	Lancaster City	40	18	8	14	60	62	−2	62	
10	Guiseley	40	18	7	15	69	63	+6	61	
11	Ilkeston Town	40	18	6	16	69	62	+7	60	
12	Whitby Town	40	17	8	15	60	50	+10	56 (Note: Whitby Town were deducted 3 points for fielding an ineligible player.)	
13	Morpeth Town	40	14	8	18	76	81	−5	50	
14	FC United of Manchester	40	15	4	21	55	77	−22	48 (Note: FC United of Manchester were deducted 1 point for fielding an ineligible player.)	
15	Matlock Town	40	14	5	21	62	77	−15	47	
16	Bamber Bridge	40	12	11	17	63	82	−19	47	
17	Workington	40	11	11	18	67	81	−14	44	
18	Basford United	40	9	10	21	44	65	−21	37	
19	Bradford (Park Avenue) (R)	40	7	9	24	50	85	−35	30	Relegation to Division One East
20	Stafford Rangers (R)	40	9	3	28	36	81	−45	30	Relegation to Division One West
21	Atherton Collieries (R)	40	7	4	29	47	96	−49	25	Relegation to Division One West
22	Marske United	0	0	0	0	0	0	0	0	Resigned from the league (Note: On 3 January, Marske United resigned from the NPL, a decision that was ratified by the league on 5 January and the FA on 12 January. Marske United's playing record of Pld22 W7 D0 L15 GD23 Pts21 was expunged.)

Source: NPL official site
Rules for classification: 1) points; 2) goal difference; 3) number of goals scored; 4) number of matches won; 5) head-to-head results
(C) Champions; (O) Play-off winners; (P) Promoted; (R) Relegated

=== Play-offs ===
Semi-finals
2	Macclesfield	3
5	Worksop Town	1
3	Marine	1
4	Warrington Rylands 1906	0

Final
2	Macclesfield	1
3	Marine	2

==== Semi-finals ====
30 April	Macclesfield	3–1	Worksop Town	Macclesfield
19:45	Drummond 10'; Pemberton (yellow card) 34'; Curran 41'; Owolabi 60'	Report	Wedgbury (yellow card) 32'; Hutchinson (yellow card) 43' (goal) 73'	Stadium: Leasing.com Stadium; Attendance: 3,098; Referee: Liam Corrigan

30 April	Marine	1–0	Warrington Rylands 1906	Crosby
19:45	Solomon 49'	Report	Pedro (yellow card) 6'; Touray (yellow card) 27'	Stadium: Rossett Park; Attendance: 1,779; Referee: Alex Beckett

==== Final ====
6 May	Macclesfield	1–2	Marine	Macclesfield
15:00	Drummond 79'	Report	Sinclair-Smith 26' (pen.); Bainbridge 68'	Stadium: Leasing.com Stadium; Attendance: 5,329

=== Stadia and locations ===
2023–24 Premier Division teams
Locations of Northern Premier League 2023–24 Premier Division teams (Greater Manchester)

Club	Location	Ground	Capacity
Ashton United	Ashton-under-Lyne	Hurst Cross	4,500
Atherton Collieries	Atherton	Alder Street	2,500
Bamber Bridge	Bamber Bridge	Irongate	2,264
Basford United	Nottingham (Basford)	Greenwich Avenue	1,600
Bradford (Park Avenue)	Bradford	Horsfall Stadium	3,500
FC United of Manchester	Manchester (Moston)	Broadhurst Park	4,400
Gainsborough Trinity	Gainsborough	The Northolme	4,304
Guiseley	Guiseley	Nethermoor Park	4,200
Hyde United	Hyde	Ewen Fields	4,250
Ilkeston Town	Ilkeston	New Manor Ground	3,029
Lancaster City	Lancaster	The Giant Axe	3,500
Macclesfield	Macclesfield	Leasing.com Stadium	5,300
Marine	Crosby	Rossett Park	3,185
Marske United	Marske-by-the-Sea	Mount Pleasant	2,500
Matlock Town	Matlock	Causeway Lane	2,214
Morpeth Town	Morpeth	Craik Park	1,500
Radcliffe	Radcliffe	Stainton Park	3,500
Stafford Rangers	Stafford	Marston Road	4,000
Warrington Rylands 1906	Warrington	Gorsey Lane	1,345
Whitby Town	Whitby	Turnbull Ground	3,500
Workington	Workington	Borough Park	3,101
Worksop Town	Worksop	Sandy Lane	2,500

=== Top goalscorers ===
Rank	Player	Club	Goals
1	(Wales) Declan Howe	Gainsborough Trinity	26
2	(England) David Symington	Workington	24
3	(England) Jordan Hulme	Radcliffe	22
3	(England) Jonathon Margetts	Matlock Town	22
5	(England) Finlay Sinclair-Smith	Marine	20
6	(England) Sam Hodgson	Morpeth Town	18
7	(England) Josh Hancock	Radcliffe	17
7	(England) Gabriel Johnson	Guiseley	17
7	(Wales) Momodou Touray	Warrington Rylands	17
7	(England) Jaime Walker	Ilkeston Town	17

=== Results table ===
Home \ Away	ASH	ATH	BAM	BAS	BRA	UOM	GAI	GUI	HYD	ILK	LNC	MAC	MAR	MAT	MOR	RAD	STA	WRY	WHI	WRK	WOR
Ashton United	—	4–3	2–2	1–0	2–1	1–2	2–0	1–1	2–1	1–2	5–0	0–2	1–3	5–0	4–3	0–2	2–1	0–0	4–1	2–2	2–0
Atherton Collieries	1–2	—	1–2	1–2	2–0	1–2	0–1	1–2	1–2	2–3	0–2	0–1	0–5	1–3	4–3	0–4	1–0	1–1	2–3	4–3	0–2
Bamber Bridge	1–3	3–1	—	5–2	1–1	3–3	1–3	0–2	2–0	1–4	2–1	2–1	1–7	2–1	3–3	1–5	0–2	2–2	3–2	3–0	1–1
Basford United	1–2	1–1	4–0	—	2–0	1–1	3–0	0–1	0–0	0–1	1–0	1–3	2–1	2–1	2–2	1–3	1–2	2–2	1–1	0–3	3–1
Bradford (Park Avenue)	1–1	1–2	0–3	2–1	—	2–4	3–3	0–1	0–3	4–1	2–3	0–2	1–3	2–3	2–0	2–3	1–0	1–2	1–1	1–2	1–2
FC United of Manchester	0–2	0–2	3–0	2–0	2–0	—	2–0	3–2	0–2	1–0	4–3	2–1	0–3	2–3	2–5	0–1	2–1	1–2	1–1	1–3	3–0
Gainsborough Trinity	2–2	4–1	1–1	3–0	2–1	1–3	—	4–0	4–1	0–1	1–0	1–3	0–0	5–3	0–2	3–2	2–1	1–1	2–0	4–2	2–0
Guiseley	0–1	3–2	2–0	2–1	2–2	3–1	0–1	—	2–2	1–2	2–3	1–2	4–2	4–0	4–1	1–0	2–0	0–2	1–3	4–3	2–4
Hyde United	2–2	3–2	2–2	1–0	5–0	2–1	2–2	1–1	—	2–0	0–3	1–3	2–1	2–1	2–1	3–1	1–1	0–0	1–2	2–0	3–1
Ilkeston Town	2–2	3–0	1–0	4–1	2–2	2–0	4–0	1–4	1–1	—	2–3	1–1	1–1	0–1	3–2	1–2	3–1	0–1	2–4	6–1	1–2
Lancaster City	2–1	3–2	3–2	1–0	2–2	0–0	2–1	2–2	0–4	0–4	—	3–0	0–2	1–0	3–2	1–2	2–0	0–0	2–1	1–1	0–0
Macclesfield	5–0	6–0	2–1	1–1	3–4	3–1	3–0	5–1	0–0	5–3	1–2	—	2–1	3–0	3–0	2–3	2–0	1–1	2–1	2–0	1–2
Marine	1–1	4–0	4–1	2–0	4–0	5–1	3–1	1–0	1–4	0–0	2–1	1–2	—	2–0	3–1	3–2	4–0	1–1	1–3	4–4	2–1
Matlock Town	5–1	3–0	0–0	2–0	5–2	3–0	0–4	2–1	3–2	1–2	2–1	1–2	0–1	—	1–1	4–0	1–3	2–4	1–5	2–2	0–0
Morpeth Town	3–3	2–1	1–3	2–2	2–1	3–0	2–0	1–1	1–5	2–0	2–0	2–0	1–0	3–3	—	2–3	6–0	1–3	0–1	3–0	4–0
Radcliffe	2–5	2–2	3–2	1–1	3–0	5–0	1–0	3–4	2–0	3–0	4–2	4–3	3–2	4–0	4–1	—	3–1	2–3	0–1	3–1	4–3
Stafford Rangers	0–1	2–0	1–1	0–1	0–0	3–2	4–0	2–1	1–2	0–2	2–4	1–3	0–2	2–4	0–3	0–3	—	0–2	1–0	1–0	0–2
Warrington Rylands 1906	2–0	1–1	2–0	1–1	2–3	1–0	1–4	0–1	1–0	2–0	1–2	2–3	2–0	1–0	2–0	0–4	7–2	—	1–0	1–0	2–1
Whitby Town	1–3	2–0	2–0	3–0	1–1	1–2	0–1	1–2	2–1	3–0	1–1	2–0	1–1	1–0	3–1	1–2	1–0	1–3	—	1–1	2–4
Workington	5–0	2–3	2–2	5–3	0–2	2–1	2–3	2–1	0–1	4–1	2–1	0–0	0–3	2–1	2–2	1–4	2–1	2–2	0–0	—	3–3
Worksop Town	1–0	4–1	2–4	1–0	3–1	4–0	4–0	1–1	1–0	1–2	0–0	1–0	0–1	2–0	7–0	1–1	5–0	2–1	1–0	2–1	—

Source: NPL official site
Legend: Blue = home team win; Yellow = draw; Red = away team win.

== Division One East ==
Northern Premier League Division One East
- Season: 2023–24
- Champions: Hebburn Town
- Promoted: Hebburn Town; Stockton Town
- Relegated: Winterton Rangers

Division One East comprises 20 teams, one more than the previous season.

=== Team changes ===
The following 6 clubs left Division One East before the season:

- Lincoln United – relegated to the United Counties League Premier Division North
- Long Eaton United – promoted to the Southern League Premier Division Central
- North Shields – demoted to the Northern League Division One
- Shildon – relegated to the Northern League Division One
- Tadcaster Albion – relegated to the Northern Counties East League Premier Division
- Worksop Town – promoted to the Premier Division

The following 6 clubs joined the division before the season:

- Ashington – promoted from the Northern League Division One
- Belper Town – relegated from the Premier Division
- Liversedge – relegated from the Premier Division
- Newton Aycliffe – promoted from the Northern League Division One
- North Ferriby – promoted from the Northern Counties East League Premier Division
- Winterton Rangers – promoted from the Northern Counties East League Premier Division

=== Division One East table ===
Pos	Team	Pld	W	D	L	GF	GA	GD	Pts	Promotion, qualification or relegation
1	Hebburn Town (C, P)	38	25	6	7	82	37	+45	81	Promotion to the Premier Division
2	Stockton Town (O, P)	38	24	8	6	78	31	+47	80	Qualification for the play-offs
3	Dunston	38	21	9	8	77	45	+32	72	Qualification for the play-offs
4	Pontefract Collieries	38	20	10	8	73	38	+35	70	Qualification for the play-offs
5	Carlton Town	38	21	2	15	59	52	+7	65	Qualification for the play-offs
6	Belper Town	38	18	6	14	64	62	+2	60	
7	Newton Aycliffe	38	18	6	14	68	67	+1	60	
8	North Ferriby	38	18	3	17	57	65	−8	57	
9	Cleethorpes Town	38	15	11	12	58	47	+11	56	
10	Liversedge	38	15	6	17	53	46	+7	51	
11	Grimsby Borough	38	15	5	18	51	60	−9	50	
12	Consett	38	14	7	17	58	62	−4	49	
13	Sheffield	38	14	6	18	62	64	−2	48	
14	Ashington	38	13	7	18	62	68	−6	46	
15	Stocksbridge Park Steels	38	9	13	16	42	48	−6	40	
16	Ossett United	38	10	8	20	38	70	−32	38	
17	Grantham Town	38	9	10	19	49	75	−26	37	Transfer to Division One Midlands
18	Bridlington Town	38	9	9	20	47	72	−25	36	
19	Brighouse Town	38	9	9	20	49	81	−32	36	Reprieve from relegation (Note: Marske United resigned from the NPL. Because of this, Brighouse Town were reprieved from relegation.)
20	Winterton Rangers (R)	38	10	5	23	37	74	−37	35	Relegation to the Northern Counties East League

Source: NPL official site
Rules for classification: 1) points; 2) goal difference; 3) number of goals scored; 4) number of matches won; 5) head-to-head results
(C) Champions; (O) Play-off winners; (P) Promoted; (R) Relegated

=== Play-offs ===
Semi-finals
2	Stockton Town	2
5	Carlton Town	0
3	Dunston	2
4	Pontefract Collieries	0

Final
2	Stockton Town	4(5)
3	Dunston	4(3)

==== Semi-finals ====
30 April	Stockton Town	2–0	Carlton Town	Stockton
19:45	Butterworth 42', 68'	Report		Stadium: Bishopton Road West; Attendance: 1,637; Referee: Connor Scott

30 April	Dunston	2–0	Pontefract Collieries	Dunston
19:45	Pearson 25'; Coulson 60'	Report	Vann (red card) 6'; Dunn (yellow card) 86'	Stadium: Wellington Road; Attendance: 694

==== Final ====
4 May	Stockton Town	4–4 (a.e.t.) (5–3 p)	Dunston	Stockton
15:00	Roberts 54'; Sweet 81', 90+6'; Hayes 108'		Maskell 16', 29', 98'; Pearson 55'	Stadium: Bishopton Road West; Attendance: 1,800; Referee: Mark Bell
	Penalties
	Butterworth (penalty scored); King (penalty scored); Sweet (penalty scored); Hayes (penalty scored); Thompson (penalty scored)		Maskell (penalty missed); Carr (penalty scored); MacDonald (penalty scored); Djalo (penalty scored)

=== Top goalscorers ===
Rank	Player	Club	Goals
1	(England) Amar Purewal	Hebburn Town	28
2	(England) Jack Maskell	Dunston	22
3	(England) Kevin Bastos	Belper Town	18
3	(England) Kevin Hayes	Stockton Town	18
3	(England) Dale Pearson	Dunston	18
6	(England) Adam Haw	Pontefract Collieries	16
6	(England) Cameron Johnson	Belper Town; Sheffield	16
6	(England) Connor Thomson	Ashington	16
9	(England) Liam Adamson	Newton Aycliffe	15
9	(England) Michael Fowler	Stockton Town	15

=== Stadia and locations ===
Locations of Northern Premier League 2023–24 Division One East teams

Team	Location	Stadium	Capacity
Ashington	Ashington	Woodhorn Lane	2,000
Belper Town	Belper	Christchurch Meadow	2,650
Bridlington Town	Bridlington	Queensgate	3,000
Brighouse Town	Brighouse	St Giles Road	1,000
Carlton Town	Carlton	Bill Stokeld Stadium	1,500
Cleethorpes Town	Grimsby	Clee Road	1,000
Consett	Consett	Belle View Stadium	3,770
Dunston	Dunston	Wellington Road	2,500
Grantham Town	Grantham	South Kesteven Sports Stadium	7,500
Grimsby Borough	Grimsby	Bradley Football Centre	1,000
Hebburn Town	Hebburn	The Green Energy Sports Ground	–
Liversedge	Cleckheaton	Clayborn	2,000
Newton Aycliffe	Newton Aycliffe	Securicorp Stadium	–
North Ferriby	North Ferriby	The Dransfield Stadium	3,000
Ossett United	Ossett	Ingfield	1,950
Pontefract Collieries	Pontefract	Harratt Nissan Stadium	1,200
Sheffield	Dronfield	Coach and Horses Ground	2,089
Stocksbridge Park Steels	Stocksbridge	Bracken Moor	3,500
Stockton Town	Stockton	Bishopton Road West	1,800
Winterton Rangers	Winterton	West Street Stadium	

== Division One Midlands ==
Northern Premier League Division One Midlands
- Season: 2023–24
- Champions: Spalding United
- Promoted: Spalding United; Harborough Town
- Relegated: Gresley Rovers; Loughborough Dynamo (resigned)

=== Team changes ===
The following 7 clubs left Division One Midlands before the season:

- Chasetown - transferred to Division One West
- Daventry Town – relegated to the United Counties League Premier Division South
- Dereham Town – relegated to the Eastern Counties League Premier Division
- Halesowen Town – promoted to the Southern League Premier Division Central
- Stamford – promoted to the Southern League Premier Division Central
- St Neots Town – relegated to the United Counties League Premier Division South
- Yaxley – relegated to the United Counties League Premier Division South

The following 7 clubs joined the division before the season:

- AFC Rushden & Diamonds – relegated from the Southern League Premier Division Central
- Anstey Nomads – promoted from the United Counties League Premier Division North
- Coventry Sphinx – promoted from the United Counties League Premier Division South
- Lye Town – promoted from the Midland League Premier Division
- Quorn – promoted from the United Counties League Premier Division North
- Rugby Town – promoted from the United Counties League Premier Division South
- Walsall Wood – promoted from the Midland League Premier Division

=== Division One Midlands table ===
Pos	Team	Pld	W	D	L	GF	GA	GD	Pts	Promotion, qualification or relegation
1	Spalding United (C, P)	38	28	5	5	98	33	+65	89	Promotion to the Southern League Premier Central
2	Anstey Nomads	38	26	10	2	96	40	+56	88	Qualification for the play-offs
3	Harborough Town (O, P)	38	29	4	5	91	24	+67	85 (Note: Harborough Town were deducted 6 points for fielding an ineligible player.)	Qualification for the play-offs
4	Hinckley LRFC	38	20	10	8	64	48	+16	70	Qualification for the play-offs
5	Quorn	38	19	9	10	81	54	+27	66	Qualification for the play-offs
6	Loughborough Dynamo	38	18	8	12	69	66	+3	62	Resigned from the league (Note: Loughborough Dynamo resigned at the end of this season. Because of this, AFC Rushden & Diamonds were reprieved from relegation.)
7	Lye Town	38	18	7	13	56	47	+9	61	
8	Corby Town	38	15	11	12	80	50	+30	56	
9	Bedworth United	38	14	9	15	50	45	+5	51	
10	Sutton Coldfield Town	38	15	6	17	55	58	−3	51	
11	Walsall Wood	38	15	5	18	57	70	−13	50	
12	Sporting Khalsa	38	15	5	18	52	74	−22	50	
13	Boldmere St Michaels	38	14	6	18	65	57	+8	48	
14	Shepshed Dynamo	38	12	6	20	49	61	−12	42	
15	Coleshill Town	38	10	5	23	53	93	−40	35	
16	Coventry Sphinx	38	6	14	18	38	70	−32	32	
17	Cambridge City	38	8	8	22	46	81	−35	32	Transfer to the Isthmian League North Division
18	Rugby Town	38	9	5	24	45	82	−37	32	
19	AFC Rushden & Diamonds	38	9	5	24	38	78	−40	32	Reprieve from relegation
20	Gresley Rovers (R)	38	7	8	23	39	91	−52	29	Relegation to the United Counties League

Source: NPL official site
Rules for classification: 1) points; 2) goal difference; 3) number of goals scored; 4) number of matches won; 5) head-to-head results
(C) Champions; (O) Play-off winners; (P) Promoted; (R) Relegated

=== Play-offs ===
Semi-finals
2	Anstey Nomads	3
5	Quorn	1
3	Harborough Town	1 (4)
4	Hinckley LRFC	1 (2)

Final
2	Anstey Nomads	0
3	Harborough Town	2

==== Semi-finals ====
30 April	Anstey Nomads	3-1	Quorn	Anstey, Leicestershire
19:45	Armeni (yellow card) 36'; Blake 45+1', 64'; Annable 45+3' (yellow card) 53'	Report	Webb 34' (yellow card) 90+2'; Beswick (yellow card) 71'; Simons (red card) 87'	Stadium: Cropston Road; Attendance: 686

30 April	Harborough Town	1-1 (a.e.t.) (4–2 p)	Hinckley LRFC	Market Harborough
19:45	Kennedy (yellow card) 11'; Crawford 34' (yellow card) 37'	Report	Lyne (yellow card) 18'; Edwards (yellow card) 18'; Brennan (yellow card) 33'; Nuttall 49' (pen.)	Stadium: Bowden Park; Attendance: 706; Referee: Gareth Davis
	Penalties
	Kennedy (penalty scored); Walsh (penalty scored); Tonge (penalty scored); Rose (penalty missed); Daire (penalty scored)		(penalty scored) Astill; (penalty missed) Nuttall; (penalty missed) Edwards; (penalty scored) Wakefield

==== Final ====
4 May	Anstey Nomads	0–2	Harborough Town	Anstey, Leicestershire
15:00		Report	Tonge 5'; Rose 90+1'	Stadium: Cropston Road; Attendance: 1,128; Referee: Kavan Hurn

=== Stadia and locations ===
Locations of Northern Premier League 2023–24 Division One Midlands teams

Team	Location	Stadium	Capacity
AFC Rushden & Diamonds	Rushden	Hayden Road	2,000
Anstey Nomads	Anstey	Cropston Road	–
Bedworth United	Bedworth	The Oval	3,000
Boldmere St Michaels	Boldmere	Trevor Brown Memorial Ground	2,000
Cambridge City	Impington	Bridge Road (Impington)	4,300
Coleshill Town	Coleshill	Pack Meadow	2,000
Corby Town	Corby	Steel Park	3,893
Coventry Sphinx	Coventry	Sphinx Drive	–
Gresley Rovers	Church Gresley	Moat Ground	2,400
Harborough Town	Market Harborough	Bowden Park	–
Hinckley LRFC	Hinckley	Leicester Road Stadium	4,329
Loughborough Dynamo	Loughborough	Nanpantan Sports Ground	1,500
Lye Town	Lye	Lye Sports Ground	1,000
Quorn	Quorn	Farley Way Stadium	1,400
Rugby Town	Rugby	Butlin Road	6,000
Shepshed Dynamo	Shepshed	The Dovecote Stadium	2,500
Spalding United	Spalding	Sir Halley Stewart Field	3,500
Sporting Khalsa	Willenhall	Guardian Warehousing Arena	–
Sutton Coldfield Town	Sutton Coldfield	Central Ground	2,000
Walsall Wood	Walsall Wood	Oak Park	1,000

== Division One West ==
Northern Premier League Division One West
- Season: 2023–24
- Champions: Leek Town
- Promoted: Leek Town; Prescot Cables
- Relegated: 1874 Northwich

=== Team changes ===
The following 6 clubs left Division One West before the season:

- Macclesfield – promoted to the Premier Division
- Skelmersdale United - demoted to North West Counties League Premier Division
- Workington – promoted to the Premier Division
- Glossop North End - relegated to North West Counties League Premier Division
- Colne - relegated to North West Counties League Premier Division
- Ramsbottom United - relegated to North West Counties League Premier Division

The following 6 clubs joined the division before the season:

- Avro – promoted from the North West Counties League Premier Division
- Chasetown - transferred from the Division One Midlands
- Hednesford Town – relegated from the Southern League Premier Division Central
- Nantwich Town – relegated from the Premier Division
- Stalybridge Celtic – relegated from the Premier Division
- Vauxhall Motors – promoted from the North West Counties League Premier Division

=== Division One West table ===
Pos	Team	Pld	W	D	L	GF	GA	GD	Pts	Promotion, qualification or relegation
1	Leek Town (C, P)	38	24	6	8	85	44	+41	78	Promotion to the Premier Division
2	Runcorn Linnets	38	20	8	10	63	39	+24	68	Qualification for the play-offs
3	Prescot Cables (O, P)	38	19	10	9	59	41	+18	67	Qualification for the play-offs
4	Bootle	38	19	9	10	60	45	+15	66	Qualification for the play-offs
5	City of Liverpool	38	18	9	11	69	47	+22	63	Qualification for the play-offs
6	Witton Albion	38	19	6	13	65	59	+6	63	
7	Avro	38	15	13	10	49	43	+6	58	
8	Clitheroe	38	16	10	12	69	56	+13	58	
9	Widnes	38	17	6	15	60	43	+17	57	
10	Nantwich Town	38	17	6	15	61	47	+14	57	
11	Chasetown	38	16	8	14	52	50	+2	56	
12	Stalybridge Celtic	38	14	11	13	56	59	−3	53	
13	Hanley Town	38	12	11	15	37	46	−9	47	
14	Newcastle Town	38	13	6	19	44	51	−7	45	
15	Mossley	38	12	9	17	43	56	−13	45	
16	Vauxhall Motors	38	13	5	20	51	73	−22	44	
17	Trafford	38	8	15	15	40	57	−17	39	
18	Kidsgrove Athletic	38	10	9	19	56	74	−18	39	
19	Hednesford Town	38	7	11	20	44	68	−24	32	Reprieve from relegation (Note: Hednesford Town were reprieved from relegation to fill a vacancy in the league pyramid.)
20	1874 Northwich (R)	38	4	6	28	24	89	−65	18	Relegation to the Midland League

Source: NPL official site
Rules for classification: 1) points; 2) goal difference; 3) number of goals scored; 4) number of matches won; 5) head-to-head results
(C) Champions; (O) Play-off winners; (P) Promoted; (R) Relegated

=== Play-offs ===
Semi-finals
2	Runcorn Linnets	0
5	City of Liverpool	2
3	Prescot Cables	1
4	Bootle	0

Final
5	City of Liverpool	0
3	Prescot Cables	2

==== Semi-finals ====
30 April	Runcorn Linnets	0–2	City of Liverpool	Runcorn
19:45	Welsh (yellow card) 34'; Brooke (yellow card) 70'	Report	Morris 38', 64'	Stadium: APEC Taxis Stadium; Attendance: 1,600; Referee: Daniel Smith

30 April	Prescot Cables	1–0 (a.e.t.)	Bootle	Prescot
19:45	Foley (yellow card) 48'; Goodwin (yellow card) 90+1'; Sambor 100'; Murphy (yellow card) 103'; Donaldson (yellow card) 106'	Report	Carney (yellow card) 90+4'; Hilton (yellow card) 118'	Stadium: Valerie Park; Attendance: 2,035

==== Final ====
4 May	Prescot Cables	2–0	City of Liverpool	Prescot
15:00	McNally 45+1'; Murphy 65'	Report		Stadium: Valerie Park; Attendance: 2,070

=== Top goalscorers ===
Rank	Player	Club	Goals
1	(England) Rob Stevenson	Leek Town	21
2	(England) Sefton Gonzales	Clitheroe	20
3	(England) Ben Hodkinson	Bootle	18
3	(England) John Murphy	Prescot Cables	18
5	(England) Byron Harrison	Nantwich Town	17
6	(England) James Steele	Widnes	16
6	(England) Daniel Trickett-Smith	Leek Town	16
8	(England) Aaron Dwyer	Stalybridge Celtic	15
8	(England) Oliver Molloy	Runcorn Linnets	15

=== Stadia and locations ===
Locations of Northern Premier League 2023–24 Division One West teams
Locations of Northern Premier League 2023–24 Division One West Staffordshire teams

Team	Location	Stadium	Capacity
1874 Northwich	Barnton	The Offside Trust Stadium (groundshare with Barnton)	3,000
Avro	Oldham	Whitebank Stadium	1,500
Bootle	Bootle	New Bucks Park	3,750
Chasetown	Burntwood	The Scholars Ground	3,000
City of Liverpool	Bootle	New Bucks Park (groundshare with Bootle)	3,750
Clitheroe	Clitheroe	Shawbridge	2,000
Hanley Town	Stoke-on-Trent	Potteries Park	1,300
Hednesford Town	Hednesford	Keys Park	6,039
Kidsgrove Athletic	Kidsgrove	The Autonet Insurance Stadium	2,000
Leek Town	Leek	Harrison Park	3,600
Mossley	Mossley	Seel Park	4,000
Nantwich Town	Nantwich	The Weaver Stadium	3,500
Newcastle Town	Newcastle-under-Lyme	Lyme Valley Stadium	4,000
Prescot Cables	Prescot	IP Truck Parts Stadium	3,200
Runcorn Linnets	Runcorn	APEC Taxis Stadium	1,600
Stalybridge Celtic	Stalybridge	Bower Fold	6,500
Trafford	Flixton	Shawe Lane	2,500
Vauxhall Motors	Ellesmere Port	vanEupen Arena	3,300
Widnes	Widnes	Halton Stadium	13,350
Witton Albion	Northwich	Wincham Park	4,813

== See also ==
- Northern Premier League
- 2023–24 Isthmian League
- 2023–24 Southern League
