= Wythenshawe Town F.C. =

Association football club in Greater Manchester, England

Coordinates: 53.400209°N 2.299930°W

Wythenshawe Town
- Full name: Wythenshawe Town Football Club
- Founded: 1946; 80 years ago
- Ground: Ericstan Park, Wythenshawe
- Capacity: 1,320
- Chairman: Chris Eaton
- Manager: Vacant
- League: Midland League Premier Division
- 2025–26: Northern Premier League Division One West, 20th of 22 (relegated)
Home colours

Wythenshawe Town Football Club is a semi-professional football club based in Wythenshawe, Manchester, England. They are currently members of the Midland League Premier Division and play at Ericstan Park.

== History ==
The club was established in 1946 as North Withington Amateur by attendees of St Crispin's Church in nearby Fallowfield. They joined the South Manchester & Wythenshawe League, and were Division Two champions in 1949–50, before winning the Barker Cup in 1950–51. In 1958 the club transferred to the Lancashire & Cheshire Amateur League. After winning Division C in 1958–59, they were Division Three champions the following season. A hugely successful period then saw them win Division B in 1963–64 and Division Two the following season, before winning back-to-back Division One titles in 1965–66 and 1966–67, and then three in a row between 1968–69 and 1970–71. The club also won the league's Whitehead Cup in 1963–64, 1966–67 and 1970–71, and the Lancashire Amateur Cup in 1967–68.

In 1973 North Withington Amateur joined Division Two of the Manchester League and won the division in their first season, earning promotion to Division One. The following season saw them win the Division One title, resulting in promotion to the Premier Division. During a successful period in the second half of the 1970s, they won the Manchester Challenge Trophy in 1976–77, 1977–78 and 1979–80, and the Lancashire Amateur Cup in 1979–80. In 1987 the club adopted their current name, and they won two more Manchester Challenge Trophy finals in 1992–93 and 1994–95. The 1997–98 season saw them finish bottom of the Premier Division, resulting in relegation to Division One. They remained in Division One until winning the division in 2011–12, earning promotion to the Premier Division.

After finishing bottom of the Manchester League Premier Division in 2013–14 with only one win from 28 matches, Wythenshawe transferred to Division Two of the Cheshire League. They went on to win all 18 league matches in 2014–15, as well as all 20 cup matches, claiming the Division Two title, the league's JA Walton Challenge Cup, the Manchester Amateur Cup and the Altrincham Senior Cup. After being promoted, the club won the Division One title in 2015–16, and were promoted to the Premier Division. In 2018 they successfully applied to move up to Division One South of the North West Counties League. In 2021 the club were promoted to the Premier Division based on their results in the abandoned 2019–20 and 2020–21 seasons. In 2023–24 they were Premier Division runners-up, missing out on the title on goal difference to local rivals Wythenshawe. In the subsequent promotion play-offs they defeated Padiham 1–0 in the semi-finals before beating Bury 3–2 on penalties in the final to earn promotion to Division One West of the Northern Premier League.

== Ground ==
The club played at Hough End Field on Princess Road until 1974, with their headquarters in the Princess Hotel. They then moved to a new ground on Timpson Road in the Baguley area of Wythenshawe, where three prefab houses were converted into a clubhouse. The ground was named Ericstan Park after founder members Eric Renard and Stan Hahn. The two are also remembered in the club badge, which includes a fox (Renard in French) and cockerel (Hänchen in German).

A new clubhouse was opened in 2009.

== Honours ==
- Cheshire League
  - Division One champions 2015–16
  - Division Two champions 2014–15
  - JA Walton Challenge Cup winners 2014–15
- Manchester League
  - Division One champions 1974–75, 2011–12
  - Division Two champions 1973–74
  - Gilcryst Cup winners 1984–85
  - Murray Shield winners 1999–2000
- Lancashire & Cheshire Amateur League
  - Division One champions 1965–66, 1966–67, 1968–69, 1969–70, 1970–71
  - Division Two champions 1964–65
  - Division B champions 1963–64
  - Division Three champions 1959–60
  - Division C champions 1958–59
  - Whitehead Cup winners 1963–64, 1966–67, 1970–71
  - Rhodes Cup winners 1968–69
  - Hellawell Shield winners 1968–69
  - Aggregate Trophy winners 1968–69
- South Manchester & Wythenshawe League
  - Division Two champions 1949–50
  - Barker Cup winners 1950–51
- Manchester Challenge Trophy
  - Winners 1976–77, 1977–78, 1979–80, 1992–93, 1994–95
- Lancashire Amateur Cup
  - Winners 1967–68, 1979–80
- Manchester Amateur Cup
  - Winners 2014–15
- Altrincham Senior Cup
  - Winners 2014–15

== Records ==
- Best FA Cup performance: Third qualifying round, 2024–25
- Best FA Trophy performance: Second qualifying round, 2024–25
- Best FA Vase performance: Quarter-finals, 2021–22
