= Kevin Hayes (footballer) =

Australian rules footballer

Personal information
- Full name: Kevin Edward Hayes
- Born: 19 November 1924; North Melbourne, Victoria
- Died: 8 February 2011 (aged 86)
- Height: 185 cm (6 ft 1 in)
- Weight: 90 kg (198 lb)

Playing career^{1}
Years	Club	Games (Goals)
1947	North Melbourne	5 (0)
- ^{1} Playing statistics correct to the end of 1947.

Kevin Edward Hayes (19 November 1924 – 8 February 2011) was an Australian rules footballer who played with North Melbourne in the Victorian Football League (VFL).
