= Cheadle Heath Nomads F.C. =

Association football club in Greater Manchester, England

Coordinates: 53.3966°N 2.1928°W

Cheadle Heath Nomads
- Full name: Cheadle Heath Nomads Football Club
- Founded: 2004
- Ground: The Heath, Cheadle Heath, Stockport
- Chairman: George Gibbons
- Manager: Ryan Conroy
- League: North West Counties League Division One North
- 2024–25: North West Counties League Division One South, 6th of 18 (transferred)

Cheadle Heath Nomads Football Club is a football club based in Cheadle Heath, Stockport, Greater Manchester, England. They are currently members of the North West Counties League Division One North and play at the Heath.

== History ==
=== Original Cheadle Heath Nomads ===
The original Cheadle Heath Nomads club was established in 1919 as a multi-sport club. They originally played in green and yellow quarters, before changing to white during the 1930s, and then claret and blue after World War II. With the exception of a break in 1927, the club played in the Lancashire and Cheshire Amateur League until 1994, when they moved up to Division Two of the Mid-Cheshire League. In their first season in Division Two they were champions, earning promotion to Division One, where they remained until 2004.

=== Linotype ===
Linotype Football Club was also established in 1919 as the works team of the Linotype and Machinery Company. Playing at Lawrence Road, a ground in the middle of a housing estate for Linotype workers in Broadheath, the club entered the North Cheshire League. They transferred to the Mid-Cheshire League in 1949, and were champions in 1956–60 and runners-up three seasons later. The club won the league again in 1968–69, were runners-up in 1972–73, 1980–81 and 1989–90, before winning the league again in 1990–91 and 1993–94. They were runners-up again in 1996–97 and 1998–99. In 55 seasons between entering the league and 2004 the club only finished in the bottom half of the table seven times.

With the company having started to close down operations at the start of the 1970s, financial support for the club ceased and in 1985 the Lawrence Road ground was designated for new housing. The club then moved to the British Airways ground in Timperley, but by the early 2000s they were having issues with their use of the ground.

=== Modern club ===
In 2004 Cheadle Heath Nomads and Linotype merged to form Linotype & Cheadle Heath Nomads. The Mid-Cheshire League was renamed the Cheshire League in 2007, with Division One becoming the Premier Division in 2014. In 2014–15 the club won the league title, going on to finish as runners-up the following season.

After finishing fourth in the league in 2018, the club were promoted to Division One South of the North West Counties League, also changing their name to Cheadle Heath Nomads.

== Ground ==
At the foundation of Cheadle Heath Nomads, the founders raised £1,000 to purchase land in Cheadle Heath to establish a sports club, with the club opening in 1921. After World War II a Nissen hut was built. The ground was shared with the cricket team, which prevented the club moving up to the Mid-Cheshire League until the cricket team folded. During the 2010s, ground improvements were made in order to move up the football pyramid, with a 50-seat stand and floodlights installed.

== Honours ==
=== Linotype ===
- Mid-Cheshire League
  - Champions 1956–60, 1968–69, 1990–91, 1993–94

=== Modern club ===
- Cheshire League
  - Premier Division champions 2014–15

== Records ==
- Record attendance: 1,005 vs Stockport County, friendly match, 9 July 2019
- Best FA Vase performance: Second qualifying round, 2019–20, 2021–22

== See also ==
- Cheadle Heath Nomads F.C. players
