= F.C. St Helens =

Coordinates: 53°27′37.11″N 2°45′8.97″W

- Full name: Football Club St Helens
- Nickname: Stripes
- Founded: 2014; 12 years ago
- Ground: Windleshaw Sports, St. Helens
- Chairman: Ste Leather
- Manager: Michael Smith
- League: North West Counties League Premier Division
- 2025–26: North West Counties League Premier Division, 8th of 24
- Website: https://www.fcsthelens.co.uk/
Home colours

Football Club St Helens is a football club based in St. Helens, England. They are currently members of the North West Counties League Premier Division and play at Windleshaw Sports, St. Helens.

== History ==
Formed in 2014, following a split from St Helens Town reserves, the club initially entered the West Cheshire League, before joining the Cheshire League in 2015. In 2022, the club was admitted into the North West Counties League Division One North. The club were promoted to step five as champions in the 2023–24 season.

== Ground ==
The club currently play at Windleshaw Sports, St. Helens.

The Windleshaw Sports Ground is a site of great historical significance in the town, currently the home of FC St Helens but also being the headquarters of St Helens Cricket Club for many years and the home of St Helens RFC until their move to Knowsley Road for the 1890–91 season. The Saints enjoyed large crowds for their matches and Windleshaw Sport was the venue for the very first ‘organised’ encounter between St Helens R.F.C. and Wigan RLFC which took place on 1 March 1890, where the ground was illuminated by twelve Well's Patent Electric Lamps.

== Records ==
- Best FA Cup performance: Extra preliminary round (2024–25)
- Best FA Vase performance: 2nd round (2022–23)

== Honours ==
- North West Counties Football League
  - Division One North Champions: 2023–24
- Cheshire Association Football League
  - Premier Division Champions: 2021–22
