= Pilkington F.C. =

Association football club in England

Coordinates: 53°27′38.0″N 2°45′28.2″W

Pilkington
- Full name: Pilkington Football Club
- Founded: 1938
- Ground: Ruskin Drive, St Helens
- Chairman: Lee Jenkinson
- Manager: Vacant
- League: Cheshire League League Two
- 2025–26: North West Counties League Premier Division, 22nd of 24 (resigned)

Pilkington Football Club is a football club based in St Helens, Merseyside, England. They are currently members of the Cheshire League League Two and play at Ruskin Drive.

== History ==
The club was established in 1938 and joined both the Liverpool Business Houses League and the St Helens Combination. The name originates from the Pilkington glass factory in St. Helens. They later became members of the Liverpool County Football Combination. In 1980 the club joined Division Two of the Mid-Cheshire League. When Division Two was abolished in 1983, they became part of the league's single division. The club finished bottom of the league in 1986–87.

A new second division of the Mid-Cheshire League was formed in 1987 and Pilkington became members of Division One. However, after finishing bottom of the league in 1988–89 and 1990–91, they were relegated to Division Two. The club were Division Two runners-up in 1997–98, resulting in promotion to Division One. They finished bottom of the division in 1999–2000, but were reprieved from relegation after another left the league. The following season saw the club win the Liverpool Junior Cup, a trophy the club won again in 2004–05. In 2007 the league was renamed the Cheshire League.

In 2010–11 Pilkington were runners-up in Division One, missing out on the title on goal difference. The division was renamed the Premier Division in 2014. The club finished bottom of the Premier Division in 2014–15 and were relegated to Division One. They won the league's Presidents Cup in 2016–17, and after finishing as runners-up in Division One in 2017–18, the club were promoted back to the Premier Division. The following season saw them win the Premier Division title, resulting in promotion to Division One North of the North West Counties League. They were Division One North champions in 2022–23 and were promoted to the Premier Division.

At the end of the 2025–26 season the club disbanded its first team in the North West Counties League and made its U23 team in League Two of the Cheshire League its new first team.

== Ground ==
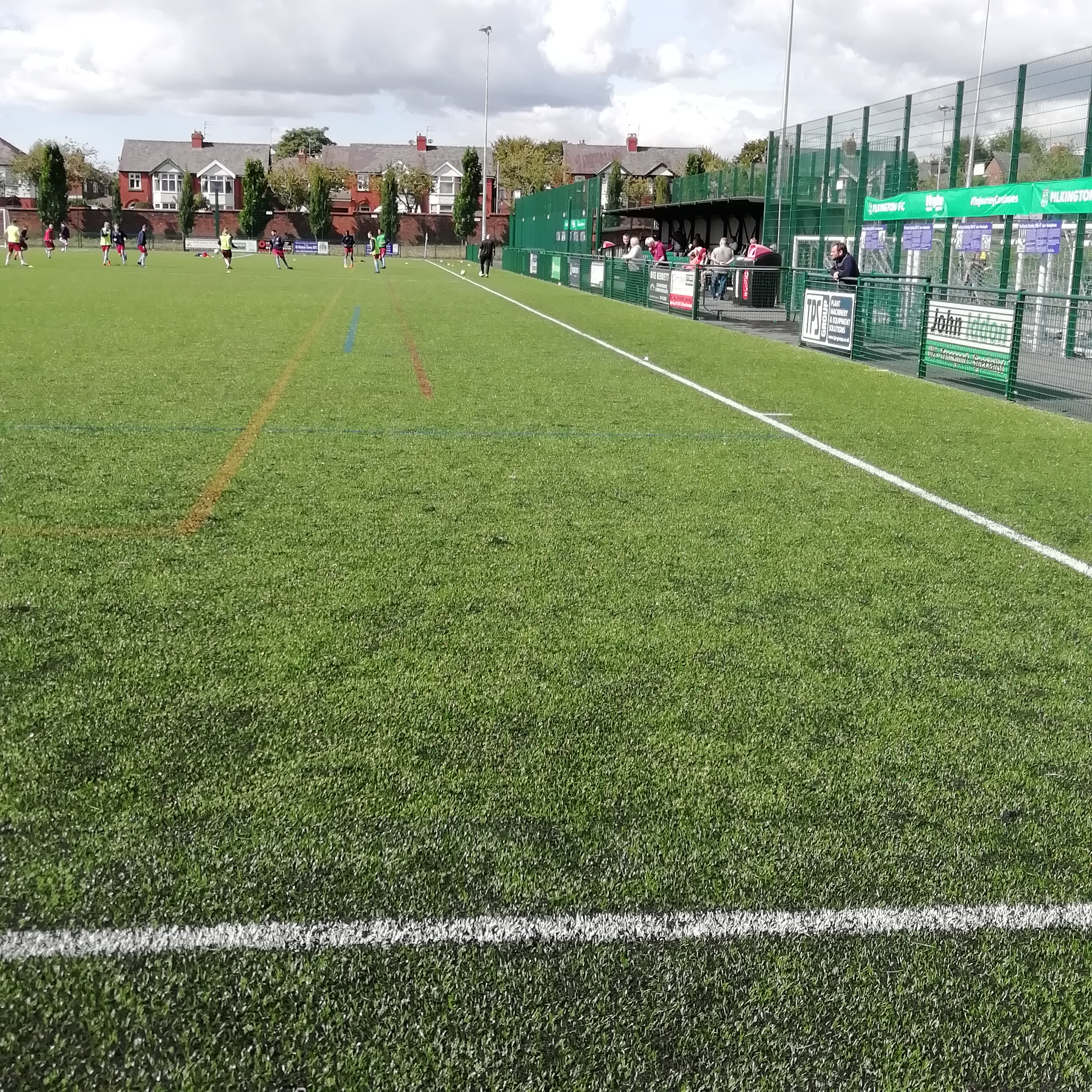
Ruskin Drive

The club originally played at Crossley Road. They moved to Ruskin Drive at the beginning of the 1948–49 season. The ground is also home to St Helens Town and Pilkington Recs rugby league club.

== Honours ==
- Cheshire League
  - Premier Division champions 2018–19
  - Presidents Cup winners 2016–17
- Liverpool Junior Cup
  - Winners 2000–01, 2004–05

== Records ==
- Best FA Cup performance: Preliminary round, 2024–25
- Best FA Vase performance: Third round, 2022–23

== See also ==
- Pilkington F.C. players
