= Elvis (name) =

- Gender: Masculine
- Name day: 12 September

Other gender
- Feminine: Elvisa

Origin
- Origin: Celtic
- Meaning: All wise

Other names
- Related names: Eilfyw, Eilfw, Ailbe, Ailbhe, Alby, Albeus, Alibeus, Elwen, Elvan

Elvis is a male given name that is said to have first appeared as that of a Saint Elvis, a figure said to be active in medieval Wales. While the name features in early Medieval Welsh literature and is of Celtic origin, it is uncertain if the name was originally Irish (Gaelic) or Welsh (Brythonic).

The name has become predominantly associated in contemporary culture since the mid-twentieth century with the American singer Elvis Presley.

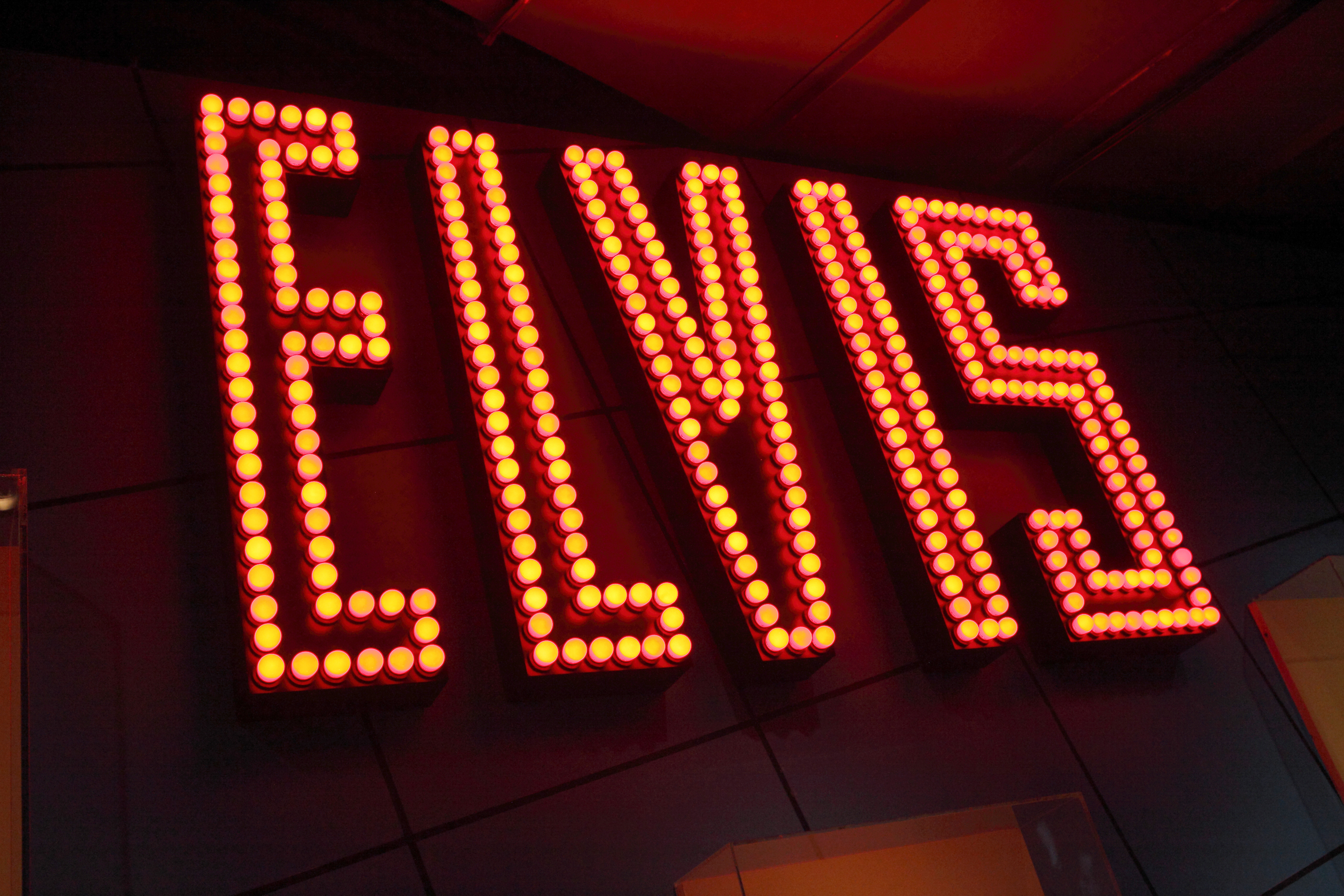
"ELVIS" in lights at the Rock and Roll Hall of Fame in Cleveland, Ohio, Commemorating the musician Elvis Presley

== Usage ==
The name most commonly refers to American singer and actor Elvis Presley (1935–1977). Earlier bearers of the name include American government official and college administrator Elvis Jacob Stahr Jr. (1916–1998, born the same year as Elvis Presley's father, Vernon Elvis Presley). In most cases, however, it refers to people who have the name as a tribute to Elvis Presley. People in this latter group includes those who changed their names themselves (with British-born singer and songwriter Elvis Costello being an example), and those who were named Elvis by their parents.

== Saint Elvis ==
The saint's name is given as Eilfyw in Welsh, Ailbe in Irish, and Elvis in later English translations. Writing in the late 11th century Buchedd Dewi ("Life of David"), Rhigyfarch states that a Saint Elvis baptised Saint David at Porthclais. Welsh traditions suggest that Elvis spent much of his life in this area, as he is said to have fostered the young St David while serving as bishop of Menevia (present-day St Davids). There remains a number of places associated with the saint that bear the name "Elvis" in the St Davids area, including a burial chamber, a shrine, the Parish of St Elvis, St Elvis farm and St Elvis's Well.

If the saint's name is of a Welsh origin, the Irish version Ailbe may be a gaelicisation of an Ancient British name ancestral to modern Welsh Eilfyw or Eilfw. Alternatively, the name may be related or identical to the Brythonic names Elwen, Eluan and Elvan, the names of a number of several attested saints venerated in early medieval Wales, Cornwall and Brittany. Or even from the surname Elwes. If the name is of Welsh origin, it may derive from the Old Welsh elfydd ("world" or "land"), ultimately from the common Celtic root albi(i̭)o- ("world")

A folk etymology is suggested for a Gaelic origin of the name in the 14th-century Vita Albei, deriving it from ail ("a rock") and beo ("living").

== Other proposed etymologies ==
In medieval French sources, the unrelated homograph Elvis occurs as a feminine name, a variant of Helvis, Helvise, Aluysa, Alaisa, from a Germanic name such as Alwis.

The name may also be derived from the Scandinavian Old Norse word Alviss which in Norse mythology means all-wise.

== People with the name ==
=== Musicians ===
- Elvis Presley (1935–1977), American singer and actor, known simply as Elvis, also known as "The King of Rock and Roll"
- Elvis Blue (born 1979), the stage name of South African Idol's season 6 winner Jan Hoogendyk
- Elvis Costello (born 1954), the stage name of Declan Patrick MacManus, English singer
- Elvis Crespo (born 1971), Puerto Rican Merengue singer
- Elvis Francois (born 1985), American orthopedic surgeon and singer
- Elvis Hitler, the stage name of Jim Leedy, an American singer and the frontman of the band Elvis Hitler
- Elvis J. Kurtović (born 1962), the stage name of Mirko Srdić, Bosnian rock and roll musician
- Elvis Martínez (singer) (born 1976), Dominican singer, songwriter, and guitarist
- Elvis Maswanganyi (born c. 1985), South African DJ, better known as DJ Mujava
- Elvis Perkins (born 1976), American singer and songwriter
- Elvis Phương (born 1945), the stage name of Phạm Ngọc Phương, Vietnamese singer
- Elvis Wang (born 1985), stage name of Wang Xin, Chinese pop bass singer
- Blac Elvis (born 1981), stage name of Elvis Williams, American record producer, musician, and songwriter

=== Athletes (association football) ===
- Elvis Abbruscato (born 1981), Italian footballer
- Elvis Acuña (born 1991), Chilean footballer
- Elvis Albertus (born 1966), Aruban football manager
- Elvis Amoh (born 1992), Ghanaian footballer
- Elvis Antoine (born 1965), Mauritian footballer
- Elvis Baffour (born 1999), Ghanaian professional footballer
- Elvis Banyihwabe (born 1983), Burundian footballer
- Elvis Brajković (born 1969), Croatian footballer
- Elvis Bratanović (born 1992), Slovenian footballer
- Elvis Browne (born 1961), Kittitian football manager
- Elvis Bwomono (born 1998), Ugandan footballer
- Elvis Chipezeze (born 1990), Zimbabwean footballer
- Elvis Comrie (born 1959), English-American footballer
- Elvis Defreitas (born 1981), Barbadian footballer
- Elvis Džafić (born 1990), Slovenian footballer
- Elvis Garcia Carvalho (born 1996), Brazilian footballer
- Elvis González (born 1982), Colombian footballer
- Elvis Hajradinović (born 1972), Macedonian-Bosnian footballer
- Elvis Hammond (born 1980), Ghanaian footballer
- Elvis Harewan (born 1990), Indonesian professional footballer
- Elvis Hernández (born 1999), Argentine-Chilean footballer
- Elvis Isaac (born 2002), Nigerian footballer
- Elvis Job (born 1992), Cameroonian footballer
- Elvis Kabashi (born 1994), Albanian footballer
- Elvis Kafoteka (born 1978), Malawian footballer
- Elvis Kamsoba (born 1996), Burundian footballer
- Elvis Kokalović (born 1988), Croatian footballer
- Elvis Kotorri (born 1979), Albanian footballer
- Elvis Letaj (born 2003), Kosovan footballer
- Elvis Lovera (born 1986), Venezuelan footballer
- Elvis Manu (born 1993), Ghanaian footballer
- Elvis Marecos (born 1980), Paraguayan footballer
- Elvis Martínez (footballer) (born 1970), Venezuelan footballer
- Elvis Mashike (born 1994), Congolese footballer
- Elvis Meleka (born 1986), Zimbabwean footballer
- Elvis Mendes (born 1997), Cape Verdean footballer
- Elvis Mešić (born 1977), Bosnian footballer
- Elvis Manuel Monteiro Macedo, professionally known as Babanco (born 1985), Cape Verdean footballer
- Elvis Noor (born 2001), Kenyan footballer
- Elvis Ochoro (born 2001), Kenyan footballer
- Elvis Onyema (born 1986), Nigerian footballer
- Élvis Pereira (born 1977), Brazilian footballer
- Elvis Pinel (born 1988), Nicaraguan footballer
- Elvis Plori (born 1978), Albanian footballer and coach
- Elvis Prençi (born 1993), Albanian footballer
- Elvis Rexhbeçaj (born 1997), Kosovar footballer
- Elvis Ribarič (born 1972), Slovenian footballer
- Elvis Rivas (born 1987), Colombian footballer
- Elvis Rupia (born 1995), Kenyan footballer
- Elvis Sakyi (born 1996), Ghanaian footballer
- Elvis Santana (born 1983), Brazilian footballer
- Elvis Sarić (born 1990), Bosnian footballer
- Elvis Scoria (born 1971), Croatian football manager and former player
- Elvis Scott (born 1978), Honduran footballer
- Elvis Sina (born 1978), Albanian footballer
- Elvis Stuglis (born 1993), Latvian footballer
- Elvis Thomas (soccer, born 1972), Canadian soccer player
- Elvis Thomas (footballer, born 1994) (born 1994), Antiguan footballer
- Elvis Toci (born 1971), Albanian sport manager

=== Athletes (other sports) ===
- Elvis Afrifa (born 1997), Dutch sprinter
- Elvis Alvarado (born 1999), Dominican baseball player
- Elvis Álvarez (1965–1995), Colombian boxer
- Elvis Andrus (born 1988), Venezuelan baseball player
- Elvis Araújo (born 1991), Venezuelan baseball player
- Elvis Burrows (born 1989), Bahamian swimmer
- Elvis Cedeño (born 1964), Venezuelan hurdler
- Elvis Contreras (born 1979), Dominican volleyball player
- Elvis Dominguez (born 1963), American baseball player and coach
- Elvis Dumervil (born 1984), American football player
- Elvis Évora (born 1978), Cape Verde-born Portuguese basketball player
- Elvis Fatović (born 1971), Croatian water polo player
- Elvis Fisher (born 1988), American football player
- Elvis Forde (born 1959), Barbadian sprinter
- Elvis Franks (born 1957), American football player
- Elvis Gashi (born 1992), American kickboxer
- Elvis Gordon (1958–2011), Jamaican-born English judoka
- Elvis Grbac (born 1970), American football player
- Elvis Gregory (born 1971), Cuban fencer
- Elvis Ali Hazarika (born 1981), Assamese swimmer from India
- Elvis Joseph (born 1978), Barbadian gridiron football player
- Elvis Levi (born 1987), New Zealand rugby union player
- Elvis Luciano (born 2000), Dominican baseball player
- Elvis Merzļikins (born 1994), Latvian ice hockey player
- Elvis Mihailenko (born 1976), Latvian boxer
- Elvis Mutapčić (born 1986), Bosnian-American mixed martial artist
- Elvis Patterson (born 1960), American football player
- Elvis Peacock (born 1956), American football player
- Elvis Peguero (born 1997), Dominican baseball player
- Elvis Peña (born 1974), Dominican baseball player
- Elvis Perrodin (1956–2012), American jockey
- Elvis Peršić (born 1976), Croatian sprinter
- Elvis Pinel (born 1988), Nicaraguan professional midfielder
- Elvis Reifer (1961–2011), Barbadian cricketer
- Elvis Rodriguez (born 1996), Dominican boxer
- Elvis Rolle (born 1958), Bahamian basketball player
- Elvis Seveali'i (born 1978), Samoan rugby union footballer
- Elvis Sinosic (born 1971), Australian mixed martial artist
- Elvis Smylie (born 2002), Australian professional golfer
- Elvis Stojko (born 1972), Canadian figure skater
- Elvis Taione (born 1983), Tongan rugby union footballer
- Elvis Trujillo (born 1983), American jockey
- Elvis Vermeulen (born 1979), French rugby player
- Elvis Yero (1965–2001), Cuban-American boxer

=== Other ===
- Ailbe of Emly (St Elvis), a Celtic saint active in the 5th and early 6th centuries
- Elvis Afriyie Ankrah (born 1967), Ghanaian politician
- Elvis Agyemang (born 1988), Ghanaian televangelist and author
- Elvis Amoroso (born 1963), Venezuelan politician and lawyer
- Elvis Morris Donkoh (born 1983), Ghanaian politician
- Elvis Duran (born 1964), the stage name of Barry Brian Cope, host of Elvis Duran and the Morning Show
- Elvis Francois (born 1985), American orthopedic surgeon and viral sensation
- Elvis González Valencia (born 1979 or 1980), Mexican suspected drug lord
- Elvis Han (born 1992), the stage name of Han Dongjun, Chinese actor
- Elvis Loveless, Canadian politician
- Elvis McGonagall (born 1960), the stage name of Richard Smith, Scottish poet and stand-up comedian
- Elvis Osei Mensah Dapaah, Ghanaian politician
- Elvis Mitchell (born 1958), American film critic, formerly with The New York Times
- Elvis Naçi (born 1977), Albanian imam and theologian
- Elvis Ngolle Ngolle (born 1953), Cameroonian politician and a professor
- Elvis Nkandu (born 1971), Zambian politician
- Elvis Nolasco (born 1968), American actor
- Elvis Nyathi (1979–2022), Zimbabwean murdered in South Africa
- Elvis Pompilio, Belgian fashion designer
- Elvis Sekyanzi (born 1975), Ugandan businessman
- Elvis Siwela, South African politician
- Elvis Jacob Stahr Jr. (1916–1998), American administrator and government official
- Elvis Stephenson (born 1957), Indian politician
- Elvis Tjin Asjoe (born 1966), Dutch politician
- Elvis Tsui (born 1961), the stage name of Xu Jinjiang, Hong Kong actor

== Fictional characters ==
- Elvis, a pet alligator in Miami Vice
- Elvis Cole, private investigator and protagonist of the Robert Crais series of crime novels
- Elvis Cridlington, a firefighter in Fireman Sam
- Elvis, a bizarre bird who lives with Rocky in Rocky and the Dodos
- EJ DiMera, a character on the American soap opera Days of Our Lives
- Elvis Gratton, a character in the short films, films, and television series of Pierre Falardeau
- Elvis, a character in Perfect Dark
- Elvis, a character in God Hand
- Elvis, a guide dog in Growing Up Fisher
- Li'l Elvis Jones, main character in the Australian animated musical children's television series Li'l Elvis and the Truckstoppers
- Elvis, the cranky lion villager from the videogames franchise Animal Crossing
