= Elvis González =

Elvis González may refer to:

- Elvis González (footballer) (born 1982), Colombian footballer
- Elvis González Valencia (born 1980), suspected Mexican drug lord
