= Congleton Town F.C. =

English football club

Coordinates: 53°09′42″N 2°13′15″W

Congleton Town
- Full name: Congleton Town Football Club
- Nickname: The Bears
- Founded: 1901; 125 years ago
- Ground: Cleric Stadium (Since 1903; 123 years ago)
- Capacity: 1,500 (250 seated)
- Manager: Richard Duffy
- League: Northern Premier League Division One West
- 2025–26: Northern Premier League Division One West, 18th of 22
- Website: https://ctfc.club/
Home colours	Away colours

Congleton Town Football Club is an association football club based in Congleton, Cheshire, England. They currently play in the Northern Premier League Division One West and are full members of the Cheshire County Football Association. The club have played in a number of regional leagues in the Cheshire area.

== History ==
The club was formed in 1901 and joined the Crewe and District League, and were crowned champions in their first three seasons from 1901–02 to 1903–04. In 1904–05, they finished in fifth place. They then joined the North Staffordshire and District League in the 1905–06 season finishing in third place. Up until the outbreak of World War I their highest league placing came in 1914–15 when they were runners-up. When the league resumed after the war Congleton spent one last season in the league, 1919–20 finishing as league champions.

In 1920, they joined the Cheshire County League, finishing as runners-up to Winsford in their first season, 1920–21, under player-manager Hugh Moffat. In 1939–40, they spent one season in the Macclesfield and District League, finishing in equal first place and winning the end of season play-off against Bollington Cross to be crowned champions.

When football resumed after World War II Congleton Town were once again back in the Cheshire County League. However, the struggled at first including finishing in last place in 1947–48. The club continued to struggle and spent the 1950s finishing toward the bottom of the table each season.

They began the 1960s still struggling culminating in a last place finish in 1964–65, before joining the Manchester League in the 1965–66 season, finishing in fifth place. Their stay in the league though lasted just three seasons and in the 1968–69 season they joined the Mid-Cheshire League, finishing in eighth place. In 1969–70, they were runners-up. They were runners-up again in 1971–72 then in 1973–74 they were crowned Mid-Cheshire league champions. The following season they finished third before winning the league for a second time in 1975–76. After another runners-up finish in 1976–77, they won the title for a third time in 1977–78, their last season in the league. In 1978, the club re-joined the Cheshire County League, finishing in seventh place in their first season back in the league, 1978–79. They won the league in its final season, 1981–82 before the league merged with the Lancashire Combination to form the North West Counties Football League in which they were founder members in 1982–83. In 1985–86, they were runners-up in the league, only missing out on the title on goal difference. In 1987–88, they joined the Northern Premier League in the newly created Division One, finishing in ninth place. In the 1989–90 season, they reached the First Round of the FA Cup after beating Witton Albion in the fourth qualifying round. In the first round they were drawn away to Football League club Crewe Alexandra where they lost 2–0. However, they struggled most years at the higher level of the Northern Premier League and after finishing in last place in the 2000–01 season, they were relegated to the North West Counties Football League Division One.

At the end of the 2001–02 season, Congleton were denied the chance of winning the Mid Cheshire Cup title in a controversial Final against Northwich Victoria. Northwich won the Cup in a penalty shoot out but it was discovered after the match that their winning penalty taker had actually been substituted prior to the shoot out taking place. Despite protests from some supporters, the result was allowed to stand in the match taking place at Northwich's own ground.

They did though reach the fourth round of the FA Trophy where they lost 6–2 to Worksop Town. The club remained in Division One which was renamed the Premier Division for the 2008–09 season.

At the end of the 2008–09 season, Congleton finished fourth in the Premier Division, behind AFC Fylde, New Mills and Newcastle Town, with only the first placed side gaining promotion to the Northern Premier League. Regardless of where they had finished, Congleton would not have gained promotion because they did not submit a promotion application.

At the end of the 2010–11 season, joint managers Anthony Buckle and Darren Twigg stepped down. Giuseppe "Joe" Paladino, ex-Wigan Athletic goalkeeper, who was assistant manager at Rossendale United at the end of last season was appointed at the beginning of the season, but some disappointing results and declining attendances saw his reign short-lived. He was replaced on 6 November 2011 by Dean Sibson, who took on the role of caretaker manager until a successor was appointed on 31 January 2012. Jim Vince, former FC Halifax, Witton Albion, Woodley Sports and Abbey Hey manager now takes up the reins.

In November 2014, it was announced that Jim Vince would step down as manager after three years in the role. Assistants Steve Hardy and Mike McDonald would take temporary charge. At the end of the 2020–21 season, the club were transferred to the Premier Division of the Midland League. This was only temporary as they were allowed to return to the North West Counties league on appeal. The club spent two further years in the NWCFL before more league reorganisation forced them into the Midland League for the 23/24 season - the club decided against an appeal this time.

The 2022/23 season was one of the most successful in the club's history, reaching the semi-final of the FA Vase, the Third Qualifying Round of the FA Cup (in front of the BBC cameras), winning the Macron League Cup and for the first time in 85 years, capturing the Cheshire Senior Cup.

The move to the Midland League proved to be huge as the Bears won the Midland Prem and League Cup, gaining promotion to the Northern Premier League West.

The 24-25 season saw the Bears finish a superb third in the NPL West, just missing out on promotion as they lost to Hednesford Town in the Play-Off Final.

== Community ownership ==
In May 2014, the club was taken over by a community benefit society owned by fans of the club.

== Stadium ==
The team initially played its matches on the Chaddock-Lowndes field at the top of Booth Street before moving to its current site on the upper half of the adjacent West Field in the summer of 1903.

The main stand has 250 seats and all four sides of the pitch now offer covered standing areas for supporters. The stadium is currently known as the Cleric Stadium for sponsorship reasons.

== Current squad ==
As of 3 August 2026

Note: Flags indicate national team as defined under FIFA eligibility rules; some limited exceptions apply. Players may hold more than one non-FIFA nationality.

No.	Pos.	Nation	Player
—	GK	ENG	David Parton
—	DF	ENG	Jack Bates
—	DF	ENG	Darren Chadwick (captain)
—	DF	WAL	Richard Duffy (player-manager)
—	DF	ITA	Marco Fregapane
—	DF	ENG	Matthew Liptrott
—	DF	WAL	Owen Morris
—	DF	ENG	Julius Ndene
—	MF	ENG	Kieran Garner-Knapper
—	MF	ENG	Shakeel Jones-Griffiths

No.	Pos.	Nation	Player
—	MF	ENG	Theo Knight
—	MF	ENG	Daniel Needham
—	MF	ENG	Dallas Omoruyi
—	MF	POR	Joao Soares
—	MF	ENG	Peter Williams
—	FW	ENG	Matty Gillam
—	FW	ENG	Thomas Hampton
—	FW	ENG	Dylan Scott (footballer)
—	FW	ENG	Rob Stevenson
—	FW	ENG	Joe Woolley

== Club management and coaching staff ==
Name	Role
Charles Porter	Chairman
Ken Mead	First Team Secretary
Chris Rowley	Director of Senior Football
(Wales) Richard Duffy	Player-manager
(England) Louis Dodds	Assistant Manager
Peter Ward	First Team Coach
Abigail Blythe	Club Physio

== Recent seasons ==
As of 26 April 2026

Champions	Runners-up	Promoted	Relegated	Semi-finals

Season	League									FA Cup	Other competitions		Top scorer – League goals in ()		Average attendance (League)
Season	Division	Pld	W	D	L	F	A	Pts	Pos	FA Cup	Name	Goal	Top scorer – League goals in ()		Average attendance (League)
2025–26	NPL West	42	10	14	18	60	72	44	18th	QR2	FA Trophy	QR2	Max McCarthy	17 (17)	589
2025–26	NPL West	42	10	14	18	60	72	44	18th	QR2	Cheshire Senior Cup	R2	Max McCarthy	17 (17)	589
2024–25	NPL West	42	24	6	12	82	56	78	3rd	EPR	FA Trophy	R1	Max McCarthy	23 (19)	700
2024–25	NPL West	42	24	6	12	82	56	78	3rd	EPR	Cheshire Senior Cup	R2	Max McCarthy	23 (19)	700
2024–25	NPL West	42	24	6	12	82	56	78	3rd	EPR	NPL West Play-offs	RU	Max McCarthy	23 (19)	700
2023–24	MFL Premier Division	34	25	6	3	101	31	81	↑ 1st (Promoted to NPL West)	PR	FA Vase	R3	Daniel Needham	26 (21)	624
2023–24	MFL Premier Division	34	25	6	3	101	31	81	↑ 1st (Promoted to NPL West)	PR	MFL Cup	W	Daniel Needham	26 (21)	624
2023–24	MFL Premier Division	34	25	6	3	101	31	81	↑ 1st (Promoted to NPL West)	PR	Cheshire Senior Cup	SF	Daniel Needham	26 (21)	624
2022–23	NWCFL Premier Division	42	19	8	15	70	62	65	8th (Transferred to MFL Premier Division)	QR3	FA Vase	SF	Tom Pope	18 (7)	296
2022–23	NWCFL Premier Division	42	19	8	15	70	62	65	8th (Transferred to MFL Premier Division)	QR3	NWCFL Cup	W	Tom Pope	18 (7)	296
2022–23	NWCFL Premier Division	42	19	8	15	70	62	65	8th (Transferred to MFL Premier Division)	QR3	Cheshire Senior Cup	W	Tom Pope	18 (7)	296
2021–22	NWCFL Premier Division	40	16	10	14	67	54	58	9th	EPR	FA Vase	R4	Tom Pope	20 (17)	327
2021–22	NWCFL Premier Division	40	16	10	14	67	54	58	9th	EPR	NWCFL Cup	SF	Tom Pope	20 (17)	327
2021–22	NWCFL Premier Division	40	16	10	14	67	54	58	9th	EPR	Cheshire Senior Cup	R1	Tom Pope	20 (17)	327

== Honours ==
=== League ===
- Midland Football League Premier Division

○ Champions (1): 2023–24

- Cheshire County League Division Two

○ Champions (1): 1981–82

- Mid-Cheshire League

○ Champions (3): 1973–74, 1975–76, 1977–78

- Macclesfield and District League

○ Champions (1): 1939–40

- North Staffordshire and District League

○ Champions (1): 1919–20

- Crewe and District League

○ Champions (3): 1901–02, 1902–03, 1903–04

=== Cup ===
- Midland Football League Cup

○ Winners (1): 2023–24

- North West Counties Football League Cup

○ Winners (1): 2022–23

- Cheshire Senior Cup

○ Winners (3): 1920–21, 1937–38, 2022–23

- Mid-Cheshire Senior Cup

○ Winners (1): 2006–07

- Mid-Cheshire League Cup

○ Winners (2): 1971–72, 1977–78

- Cheshire Amateur Cup/Cheshire Saturday Cup

○ Winners (3): 1905–06, 1906–07, 1977–78

- Sentinel Cup

○ Winners (1): 1939–40

- Crewe and District Cup

○ Winners (1): 1903–04

== Notable players ==
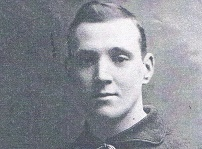
Hugh Moffat

Congleton Town F.C. players who attained at least one international cap during their career.

- (Burundi) Elvis Banyihwabe
- (Montserrat) Dajour Buffonge
- (England) Peter Davenport
- (Wales) Richard Duffy
- (Bermuda) Dale Eve
- (Wales) Bert Gray
- (Montserrat) Anthony Griffith
- (Wales) Ron Hewitt
- (British Virgin Islands) Jordan Johnson
- (England) Hugh Moffat
- (Democratic Republic of the Congo) Marlin Piana
- (Scotland) Peter Pursell
- (Northern Ireland) Jimmy Quinn
- (Malaysia) Daniel Ting

== Club records ==
- Biggest win: 10-0 vs Northwich Victoria (Away), 3 April 2024 – Midland Football League Premier Division
- Heaviest Defeat: 12-1 vs Stalybridge Celtic (Away), 2 November 1929 – Cheshire County League
- Highest home attendance: 6,800 (Approx.) vs Macclesfield Town, 31 October 1953 – Cheshire County League
- Highest away attendance: 9,000+ vs Macclesfield Town, 11 February 1922 – Cheshire Senior Cup
- Highest league finish: 6th in Northern Premier League Division 1 (7th tier), 1989–90
- Best FA Cup performance: 1st Round, 1989–90
- Best FA Trophy performance: 4th Round, 2000–01
- Best FA Vase performance: Semi-finals, 2022–23
- Highest transfer fee received: £5,000 paid by Leeds United for Des Frost, 1948–49
- First cup double: Cheshire Senior Cup and NWCFL Cup in 2023.

== Attendance records in 21st century ==
As of 26 April 2026

- Highest home attendance (Top 3):

1,668 (Note: Played at Gresty Road, Crewe.) v Macclesfield, 26 March 2022 – NWCFL Premier Division
1,501 v Chasetown, 29 April 2025 – NPL West Play-offs Semi-final
1,436 v Newport Pagnell Town, 1 April 2023 – FA Vase Semi-final

- Highest away attendance:

4,790 v Bury, 3 April 2026 – NPL West

Season	Avg. league attendance (% change)
2021-22	327
2022-23	296(-9.48%)
2023-24	624(+110.81%)
2024-25	700(+12.18%)
2025-26	589(-15.86%)

Only includes attendances at league home fixtures, rounded to two decimal places; number in brackets is change in % from previous season. Source: Tony Kempster's site Non League Matters NW Counties Football League site
