= Hugh Moffat (footballer) =

English footballer

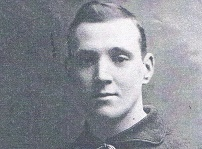

Personal information
- Full name: Hugh Moffat
- Date of birth: 24 January 1885
- Place of birth: Congleton, England
- Date of death: 14 November 1952 (aged 67)
- Place of death: Congleton, England
- Height: 5 ft 11 in (1.80 m)
- Positions: Wing half; left back

Senior career*
Years	Team	Apps	(Gls)
1901–1903	Congleton Town		
1903–1904	Congleton Swifts		
1904–1910	Burnley	201	(13)
1910–1916	Oldham Athletic	162	(10)
1919–1920	Chesterfield Municipal		
1920–1924	Congleton Town		

International career
1910–1912	Football League XI	2	(0)
1913	England	1	(0)

Managerial career
- 1920–1924: Congleton Town (player-manager)
- * Club domestic league appearances and goals

Hugh Moffat (24 January 1885 – 14 November 1952) was an English professional footballer who played as a wing half in the Football League for Burnley and Oldham Athletic. He won one cap for the England national team, in a match against Wales on 17 March 1913 and represented the Football League XI.

== Personal life ==
Moffat was married and had four children, one of whom, Sid, also became a professional footballer. As of 1907, he was working as a coach painter. He served as a private in the Cheshire Regiment, the King's (Liverpool Regiment), the Labour Corps and the Duke of Wellington's (West Riding Regiment) during the First World War and was discharged from the army on 28 May 1918, suffering from chronic nephritis. Moffat was the licensee of a pub in Congleton between 1922 and 1940.
