= The Masked Singer (American TV series) season 4 =

Season of television series

The Masked Singer
- Season 4
- Promotional poster for season four, featuring "Crocodile"
- Starring: Robin Thicke; Jenny McCarthy Wahlberg; Ken Jeong; Nicole Scherzinger
- Hosted by: Nick Cannon
- No. of contestants: 16
- Winner: LeAnn Rimes as "Sun"
- Runner-up: Aloe Blacc as "Mushroom"
- No. of episodes: 14

Release
- Original network: Fox
- Original release: September 23 – December 16, 2020

Season chronology
- ← Previous; Season 3 Next → Season 5

The fourth season of the American television series The Masked Singer premiered on Fox on September 23, 2020, following a sneak peek episode that aired on September 13, and concluded on December 16, 2020. The season was won by singer LeAnn Rimes as "Sun", with singer Aloe Blacc finishing second as "Mushroom", and singer Nick Carter placing third as "Crocodile".

== Panelists and host ==
Season 4 panelists and host

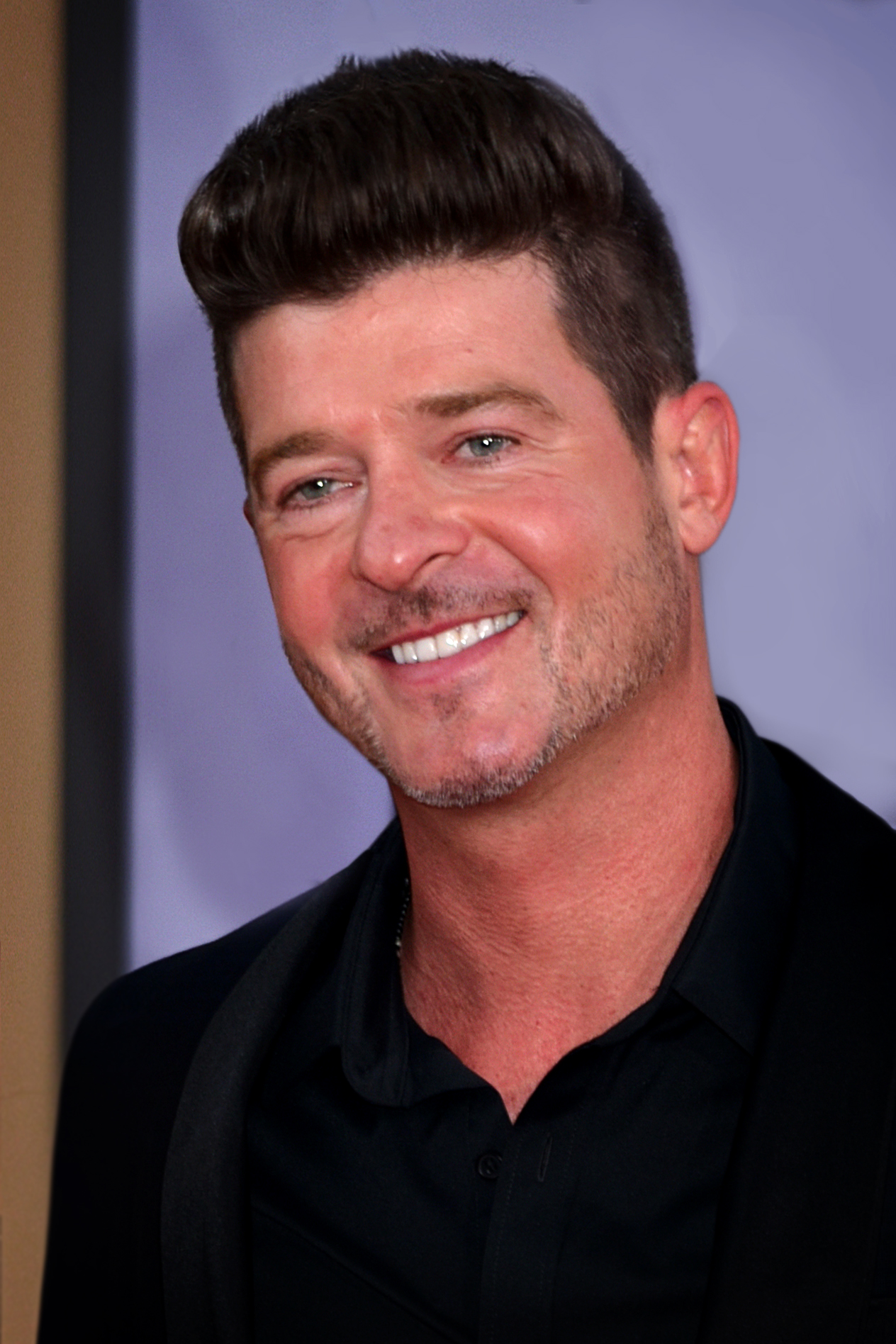
Robin Thicke

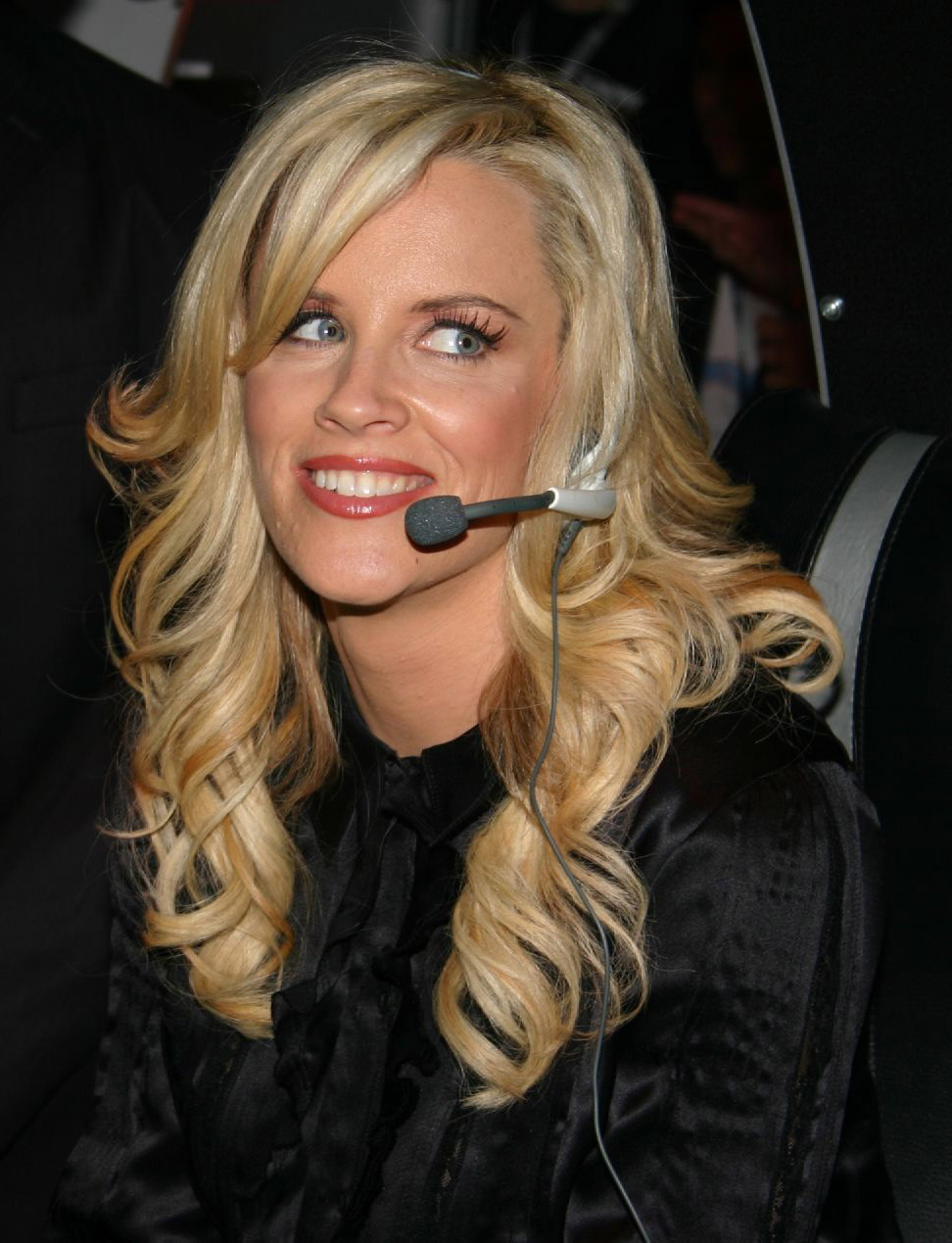
Jenny McCarthy Wahlberg

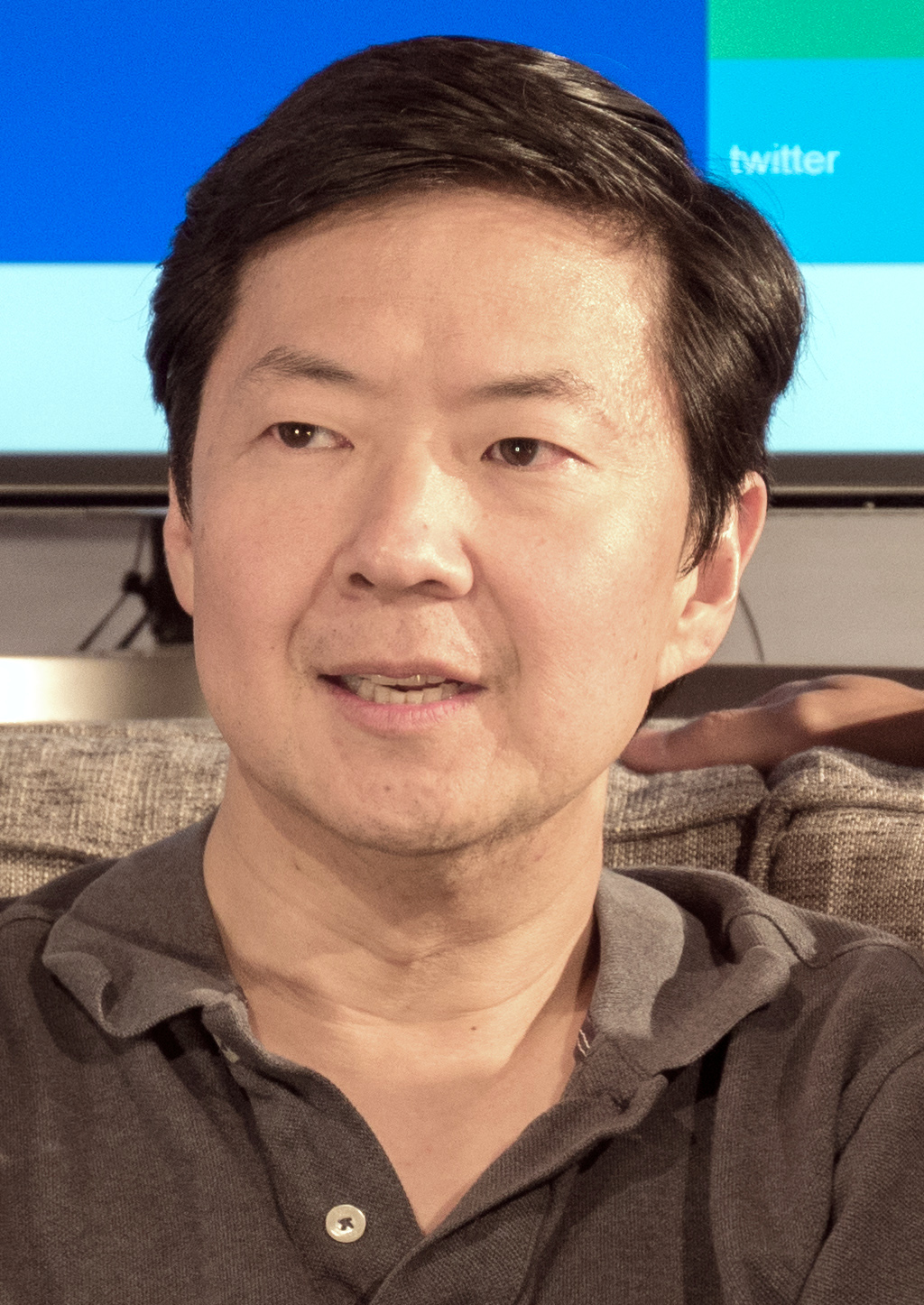
Ken Jeong

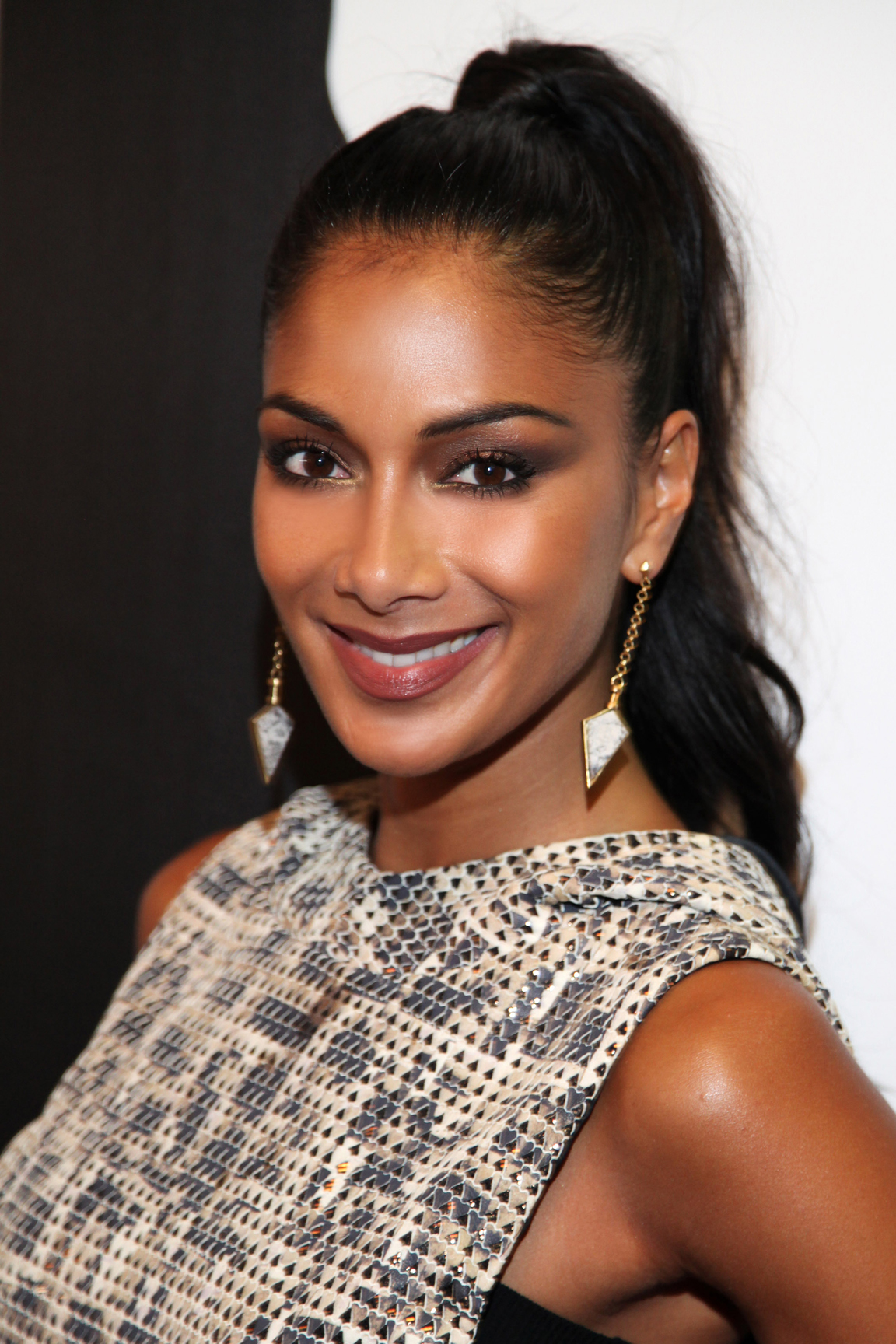
Nicole Scherzinger

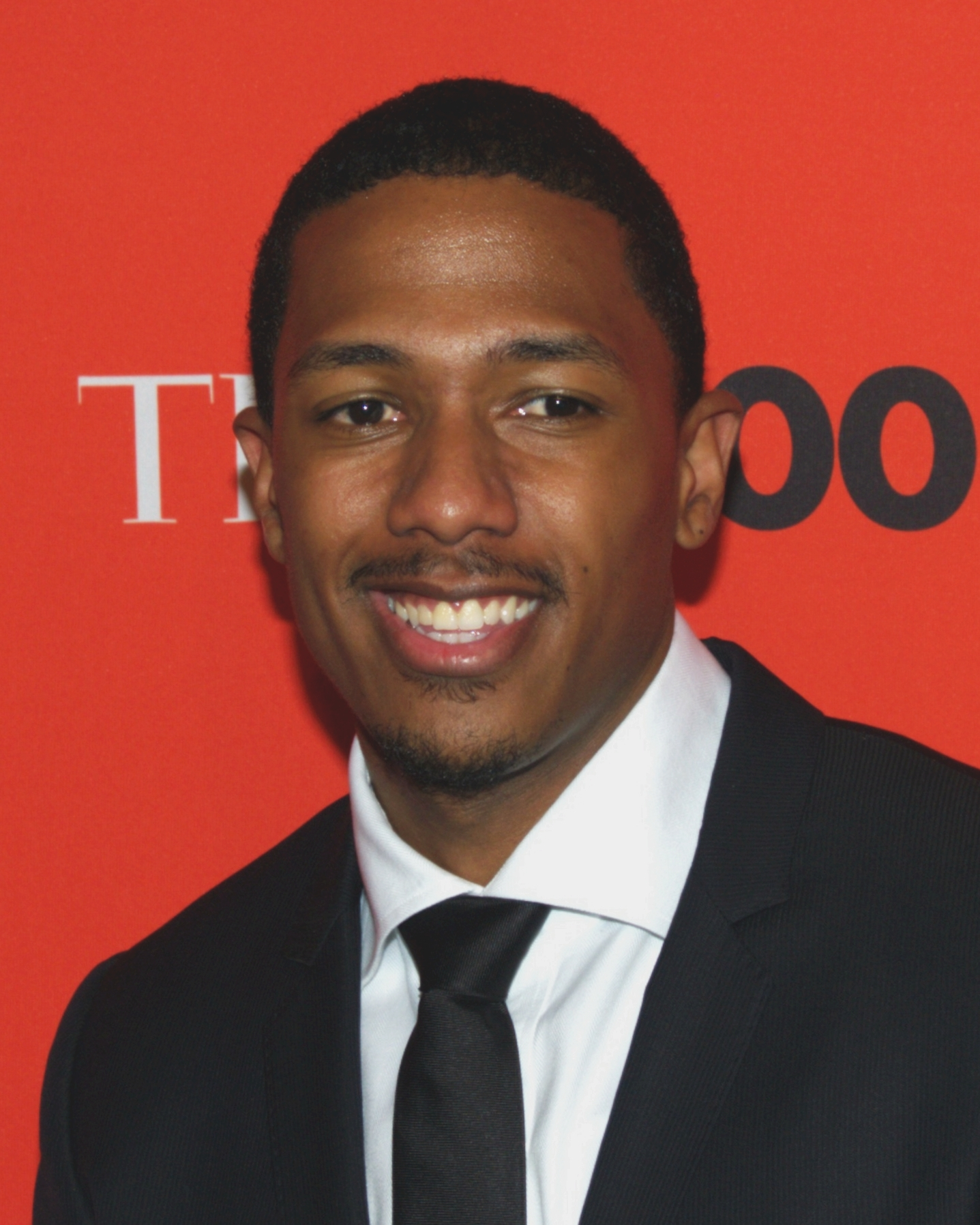
Nick Cannon

Nick Cannon, singer-songwriter Robin Thicke, television and radio personality Jenny McCarthy Wahlberg, actor and comedian Ken Jeong, and recording artist Nicole Scherzinger all returned for their fourth season as host and panelists. Following controversial statements made on his podcast, it was confirmed that Cannon would remain as host of the show, after Fox accepted his apology.

Guest panelists included Joel McHale in the third and fourth episodes, season two winner Wayne Brady in the sixth episode, Niecy Nash in the seventh episode, Cheryl Hines in the eighth episode, Jay Pharoah in the ninth episode, and Craig Robinson in the tenth episode.

The panelists also engaged in a competition for the Golden Ear in this season. After each masked singer performed for the first time along with an initial clue package, each panelist wrote their first impressions-based guess at the identity of the celebrity and kept in a safe until the men in black are instructed to bring it out upon a contestant's elimination. Those guesses were revealed after each celebrity was unmasked, with panelist scoring a point for each celebrity they got correct from their initial first impression, with the panelist with the most correct answers winning the Golden Ear. Jenny McCarthy Wahlberg won the first Golden Ear for getting the most guesses correct.

== Production ==
Due to the COVID-19 pandemic in the United States, various industry-adopted safety protocols were implemented for production (as well as a change in location from Television City to Red Studios Hollywood), which included that the tapings to have a virtual audience, and that the judging panel would be 8 feet apart from each other. Fox Alternative Entertainment president Rob Wade said that the show would still "feel very much like" past seasons, having employed "various quarantining and various camera tricks" to preserve the visible presence of a studio audience. Executive producer Craig Plestis stated that a goal for season four's costumes was to "increase the bonkers level and keep the production values up". A "virtual audience" was incorporated into voting. To accommodate social distancing, many of the clue packages used animation by Bento Box Entertainment, the studio behind Bob's Burgers as opposed to live-action filming typically used for their clue packaging.

== Contestants ==
The season featured 16 contestants, including "Snow Owls" wearing the first duet costume with its own vehicle, the first costume to have animatronic parts ("Serpent"), and the first puppet costume ("Baby Alien"). The contestants in this season are reported to have a combined net worth over $398 million, 46 Grammy nominations, 23 platinum records, 10 Hall of Fame appearances, and one Olympic gold medal, to collectively have sold over 281 million records, appeared in over 5,475 episodes of television and 151 films, made five Super Bowl appearances, have four stars on the Hollywood Walk of Fame, hold three world records, one Time 100 honor, and one Oscar nomination in a major category.

Results
Stage name	Celebrity	Occupation(s)	Episodes										
Stage name	Celebrity	Occupation(s)	1	2	3	4	5	6	7	8	9	10	12
Stage name	Celebrity	Occupation(s)	Group A	Group B	A	B	Group C		A	B	C	10	12
Sun	LeAnn Rimes	Singer	SAFE		SAFE				WIN			WIN	WINNER
Mushroom	Aloe Blacc	Singer					SAFE	SAFE			RISK	WIN	RUNNER-UP
Crocodile	Nick Carter	Singer		SAFE		SAFE				SAFE		WIN	THIRD
Seahorse	Tori Kelly	Singer		SAFE		SAFE				SAFE		OUT	
Jellyfish	Chloe Kim	Snowboarder					SAFE	SAFE			WIN	OUT	
Popcorn	Taylor Dayne	Singer	SAFE		SAFE				RISK			OUT	
Broccoli	Paul Anka	Singer					SAFE	SAFE			OUT		
Serpent	Dr. Elvis Francois	Surgeon/viral video star		SAFE		SAFE				OUT			
Whatchamacallit	Lonzo Ball	NBA player		SAFE		SAFE				OUT			
Snow Owls	Clint Black	Singer	SAFE		SAFE				OUT (Note: Prior to the unmasking, Nick Cannon had to enlist the Snow Owls' dancers to "hatch" them out of their egg vehicle for a final clue to their identity.)				
Snow Owls	Lisa Hartman Black	Actor/singer	SAFE		SAFE				OUT				
Squiggly Monster	Bob Saget	Comedian/TV host					SAFE	OUT					
Lips	Wendy Williams	Broadcaster					OUT						
Baby Alien	Mark Sanchez	Retired NFL player		SAFE		OUT							
Giraffe	Brian Austin Green	Actor	SAFE		OUT								
Gremlin	Mickey Rourke	Actor/boxer		WD (Note: Rourke, after completing his performance in costume and while being interviewed by Cannon, complained about how hot it was in the costume and proceeded to unmask himself before the judges could vote, eliminating himself from the competition.)									
Dragon	Busta Rhymes	Rapper	OUT										

The masked singer won with their performance and remained in the competition.
The masked singer was in the bottom two, but was not eliminated.
The masked singer was safe from elimination.
The masked singer was eliminated from the competition and unmasked.
The masked singer did not perform.
The masked singer unmasked themselves and left the competition.
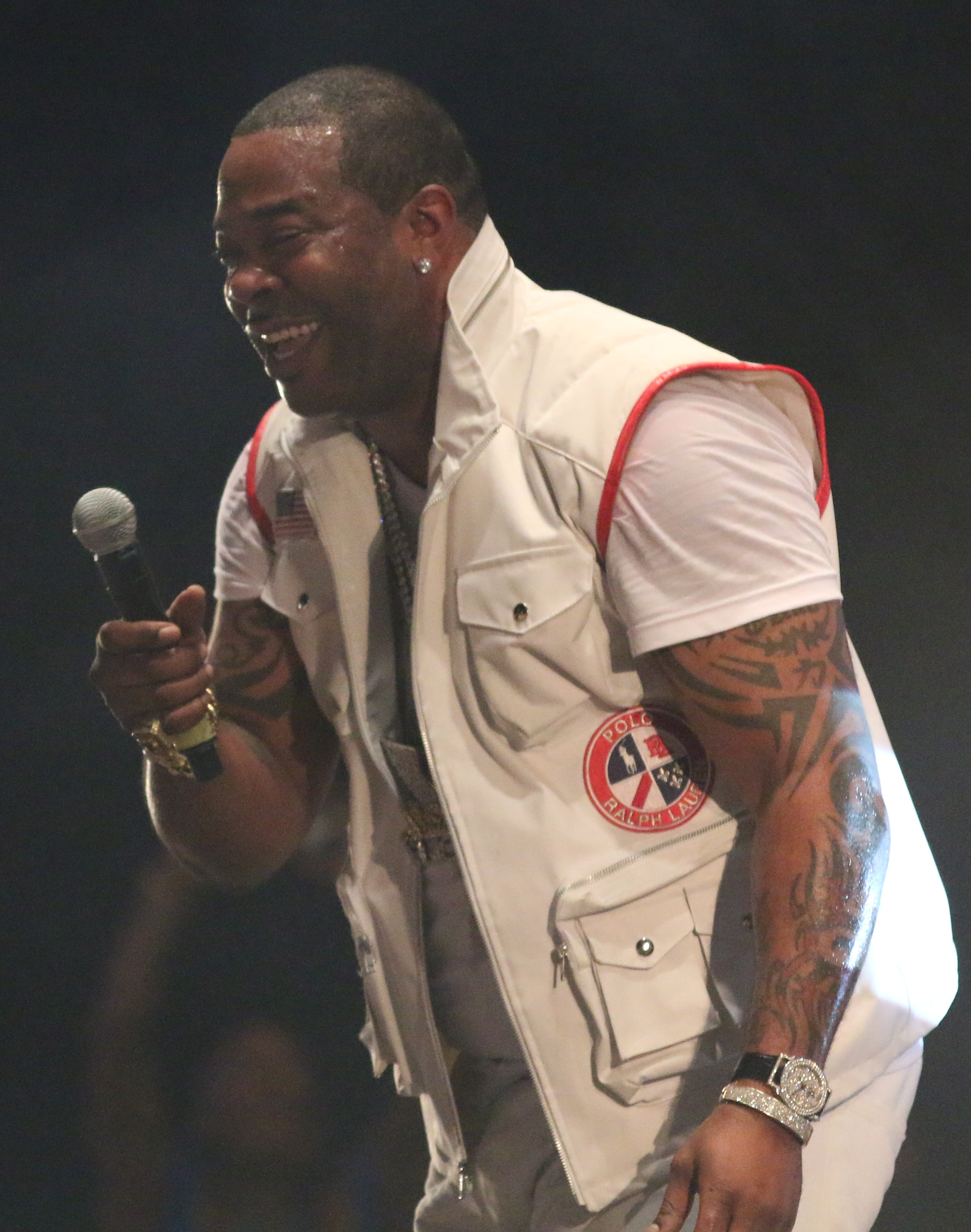
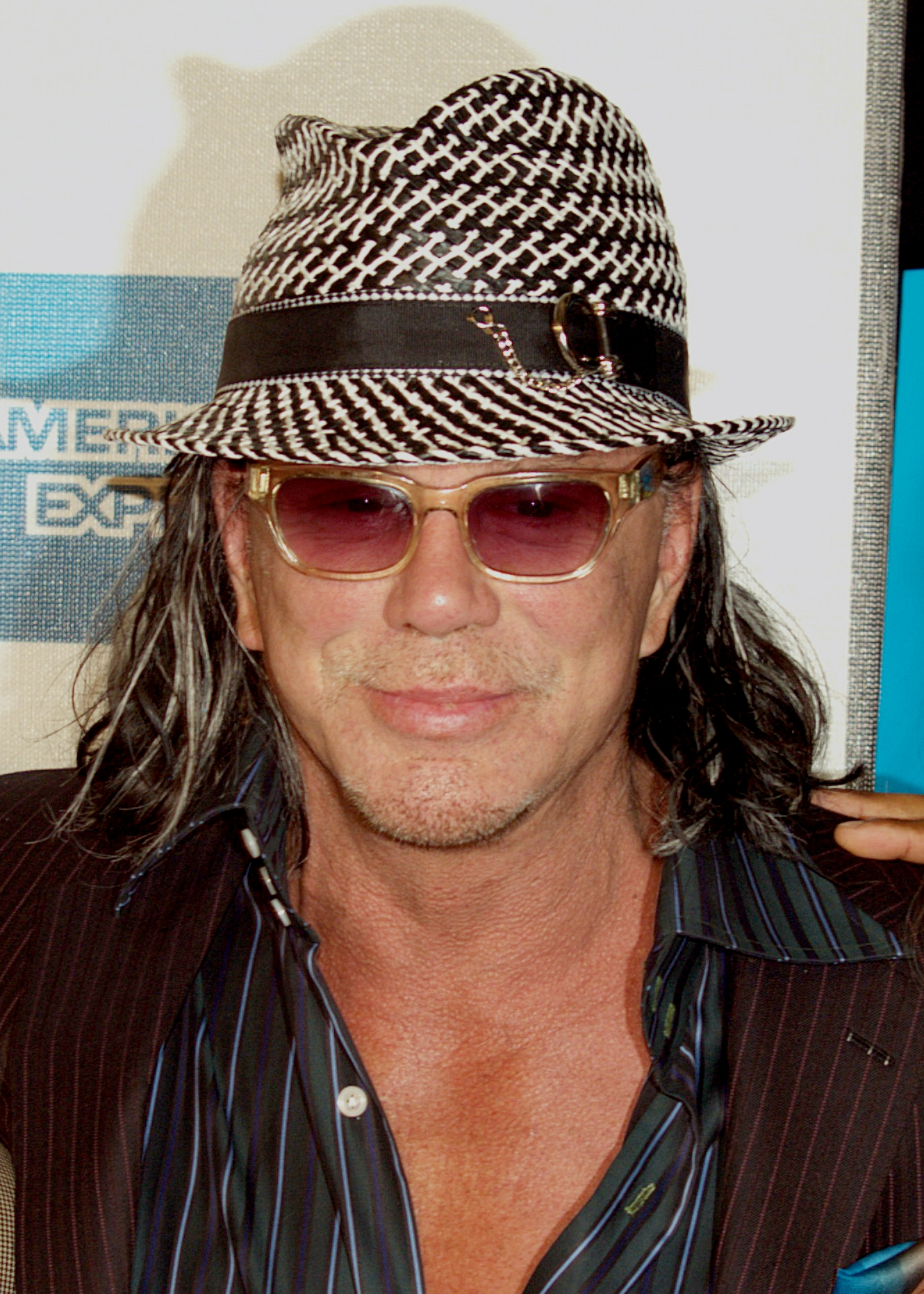
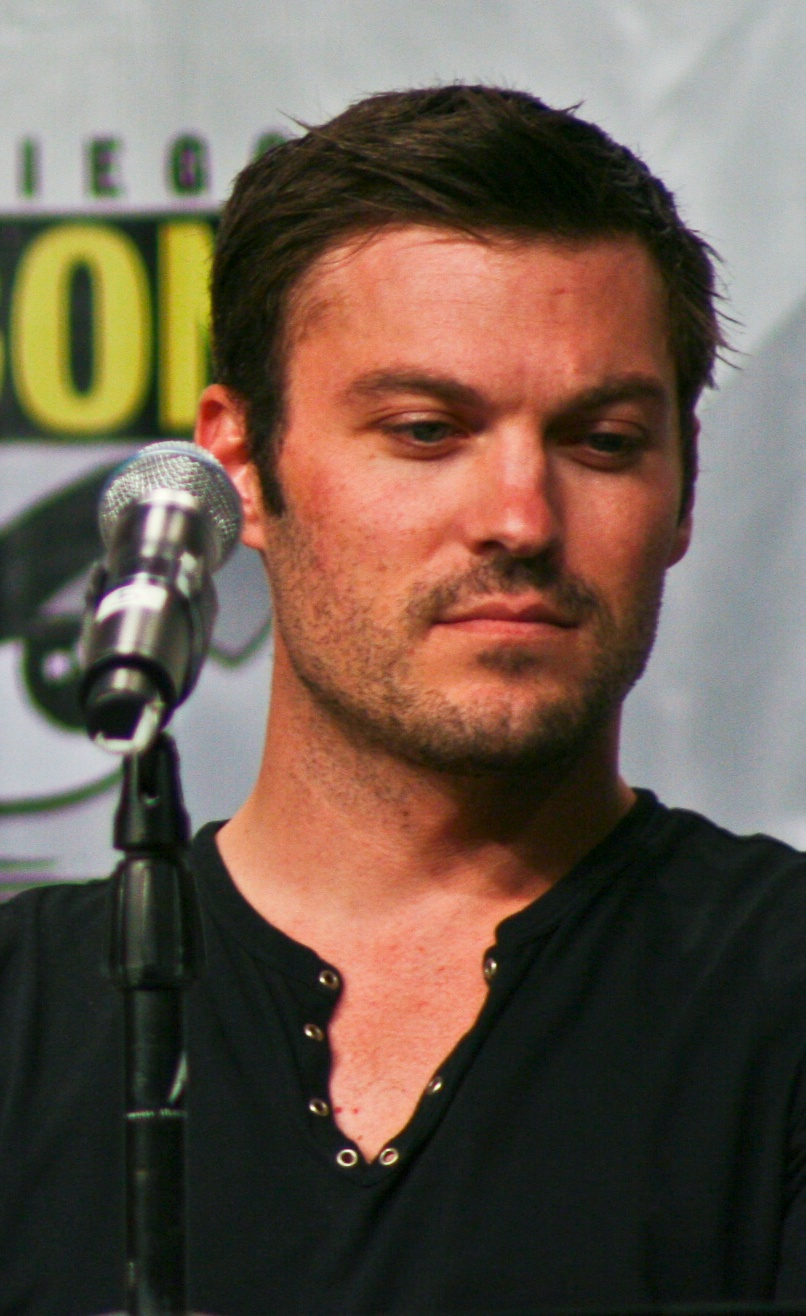
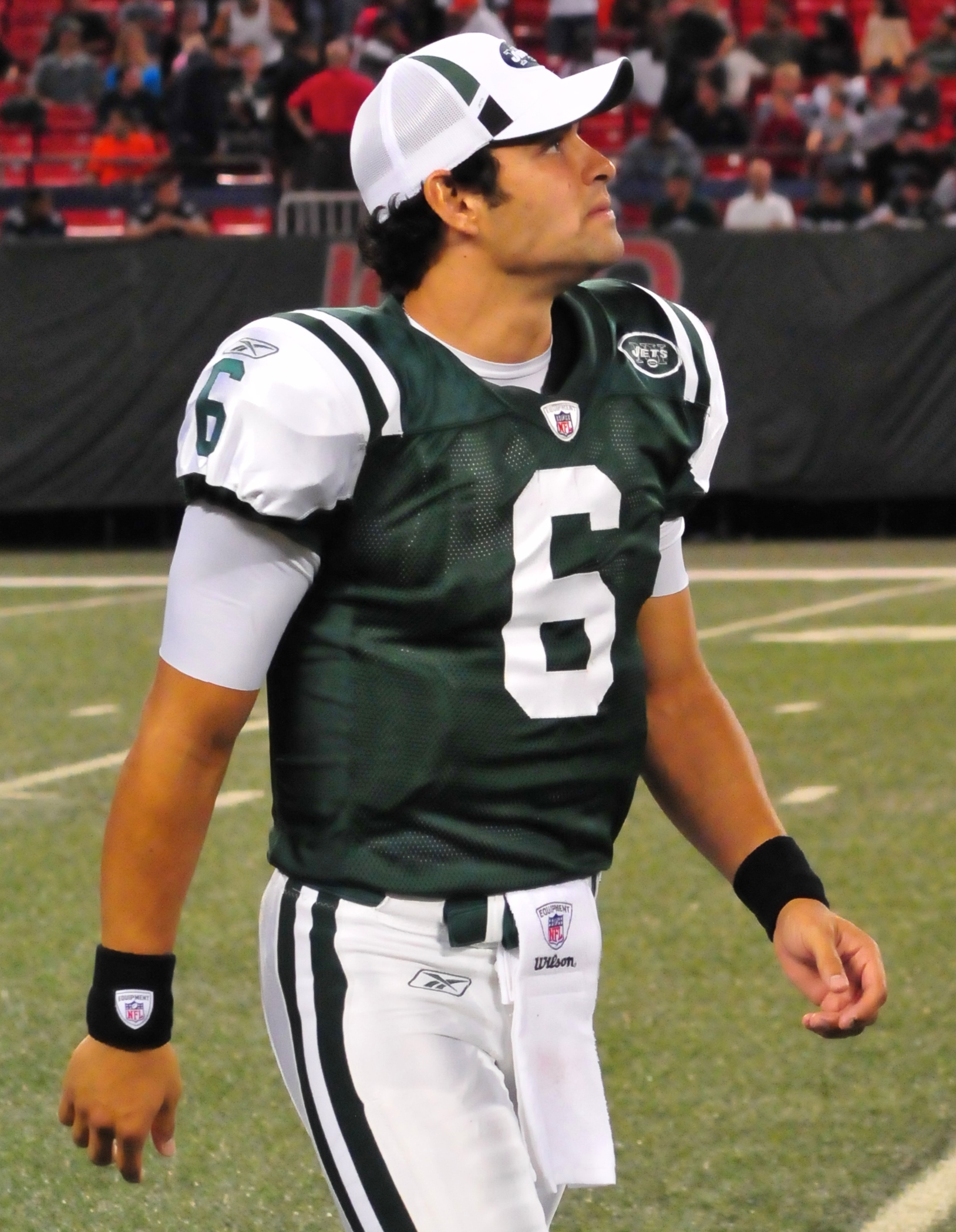
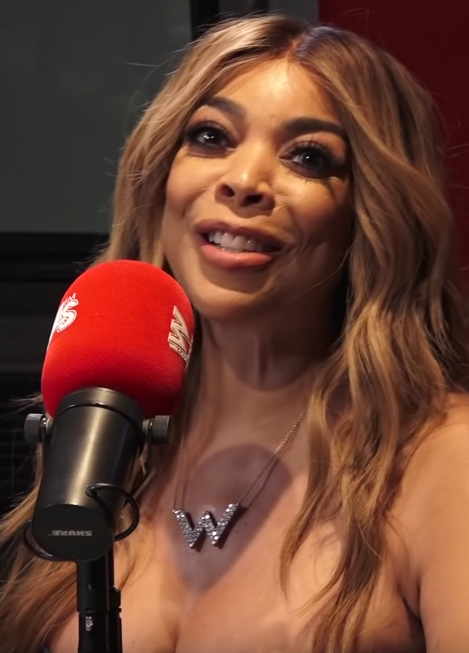
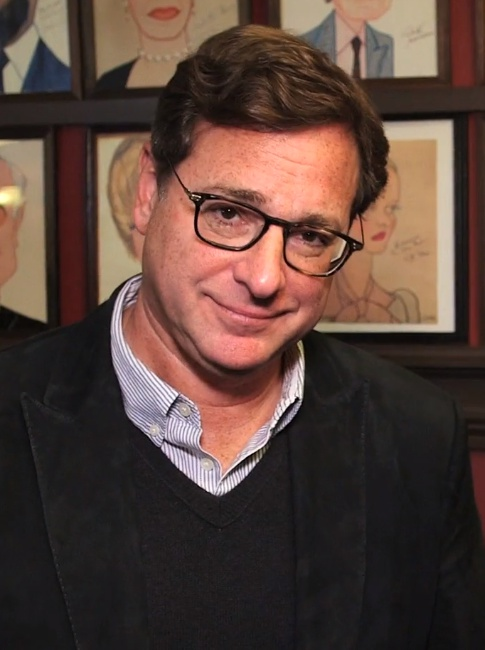
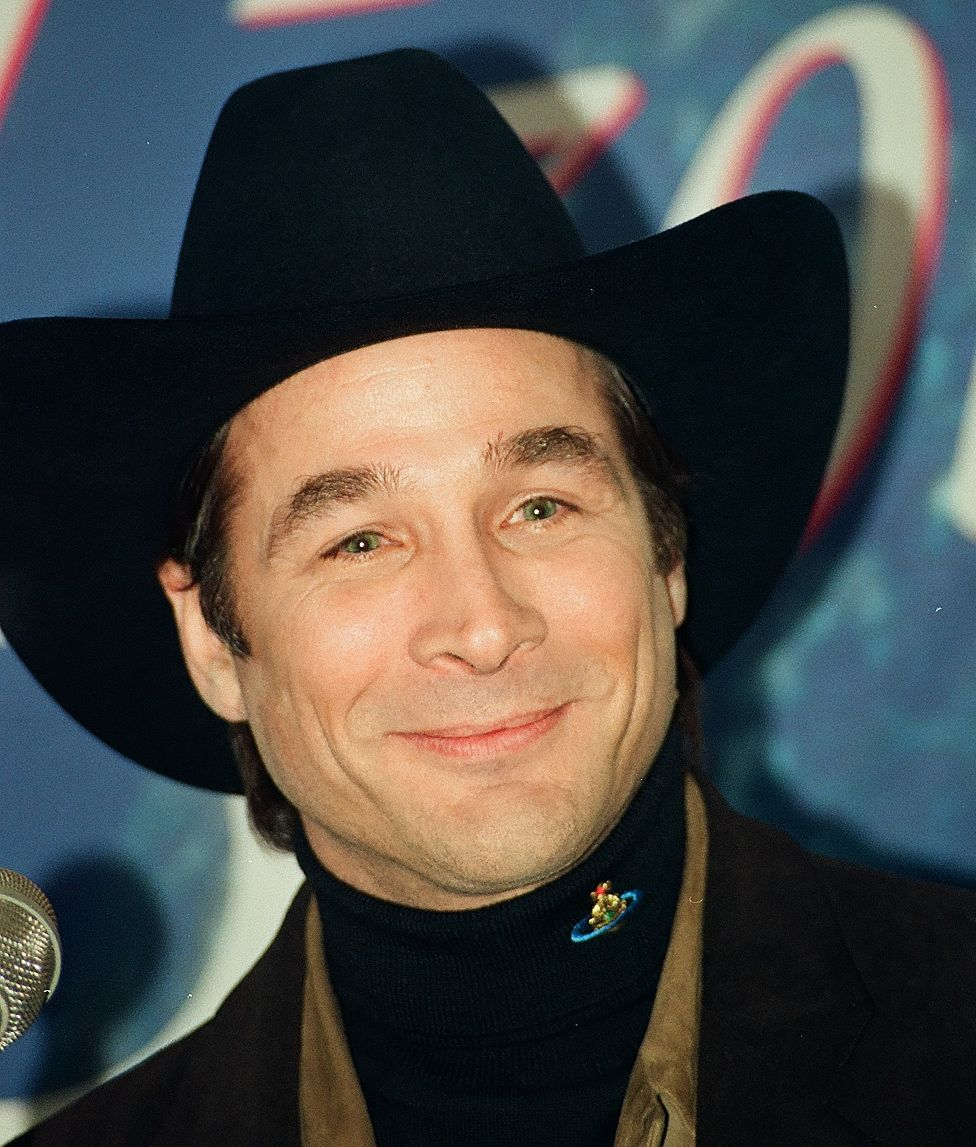
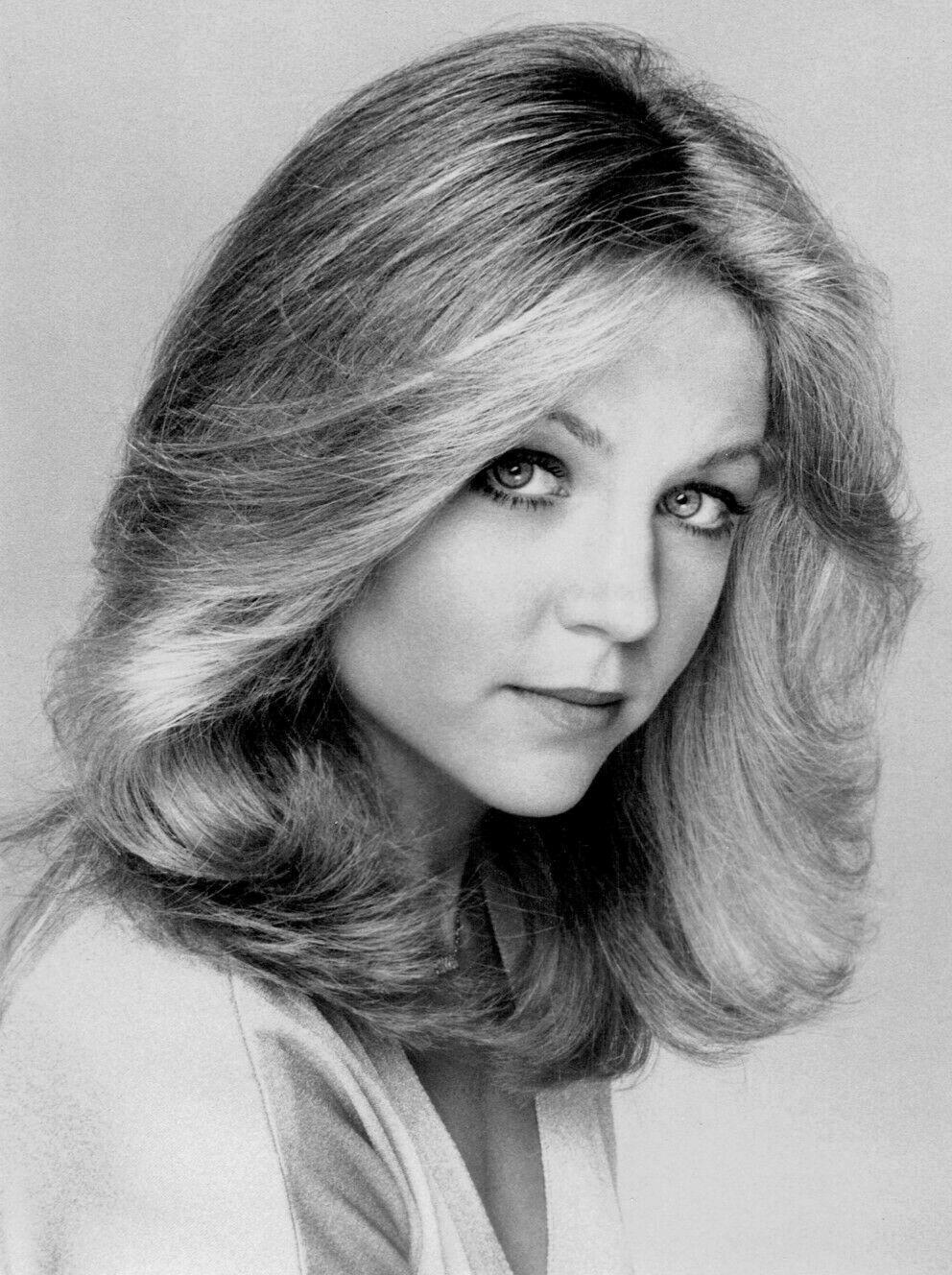
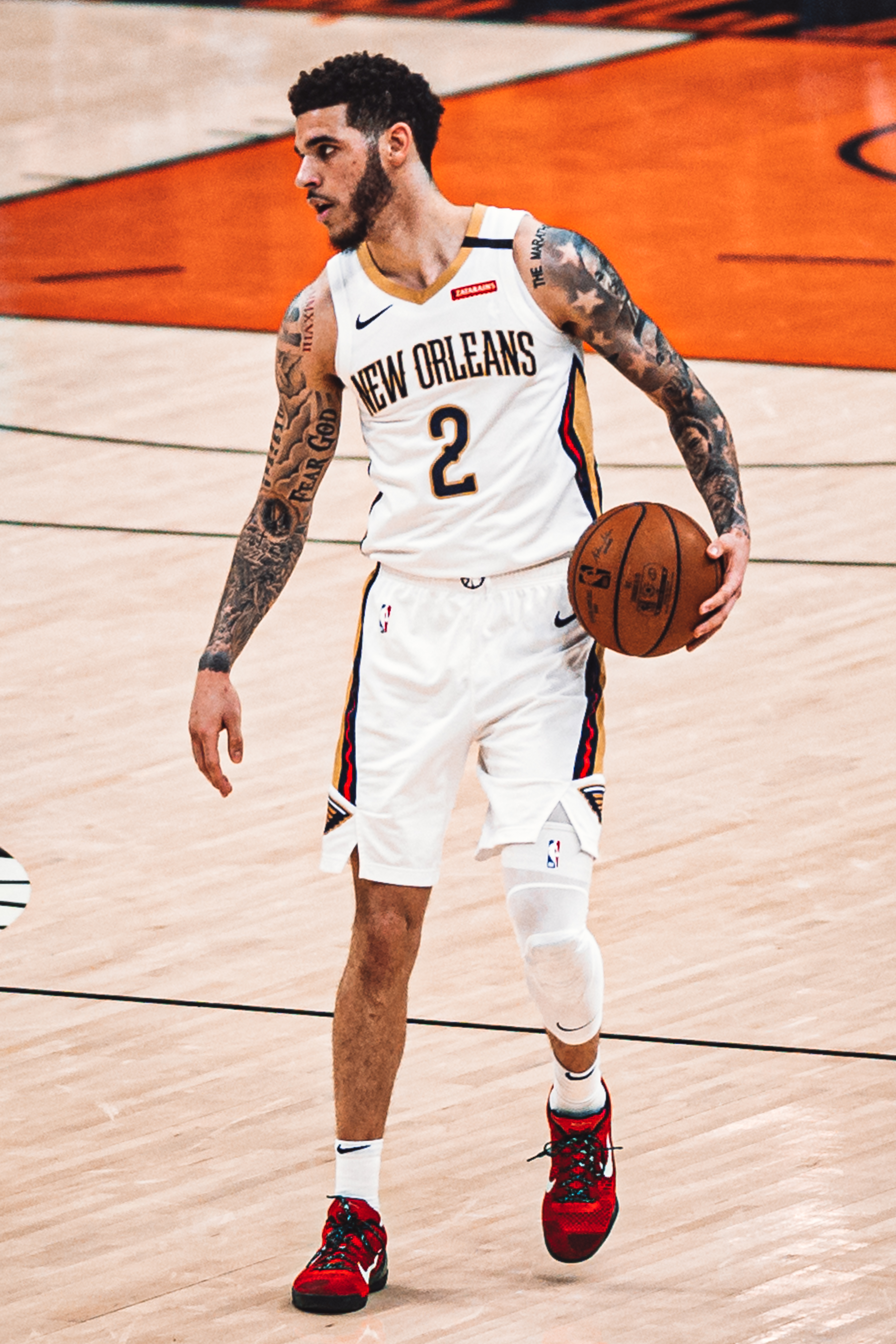
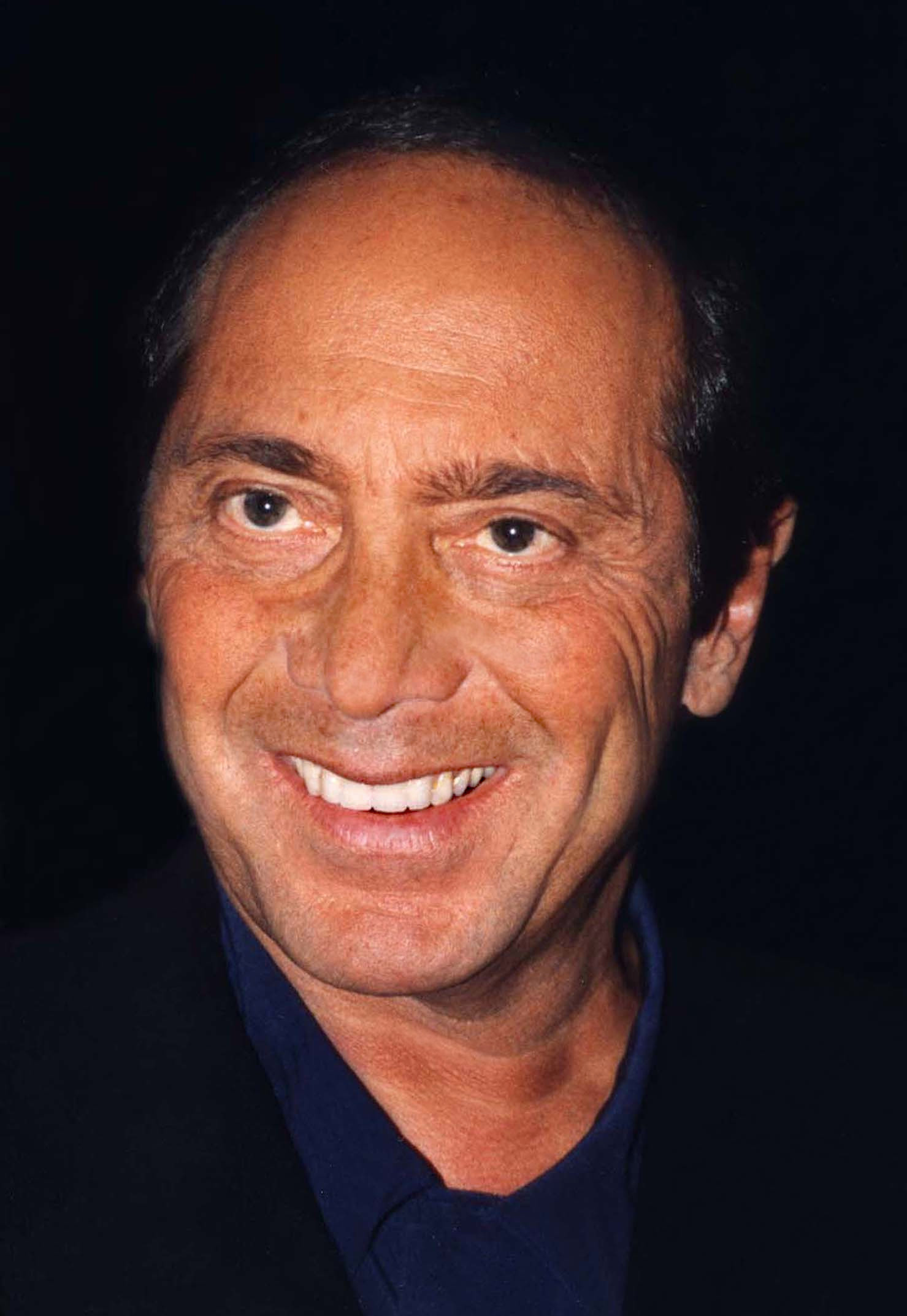
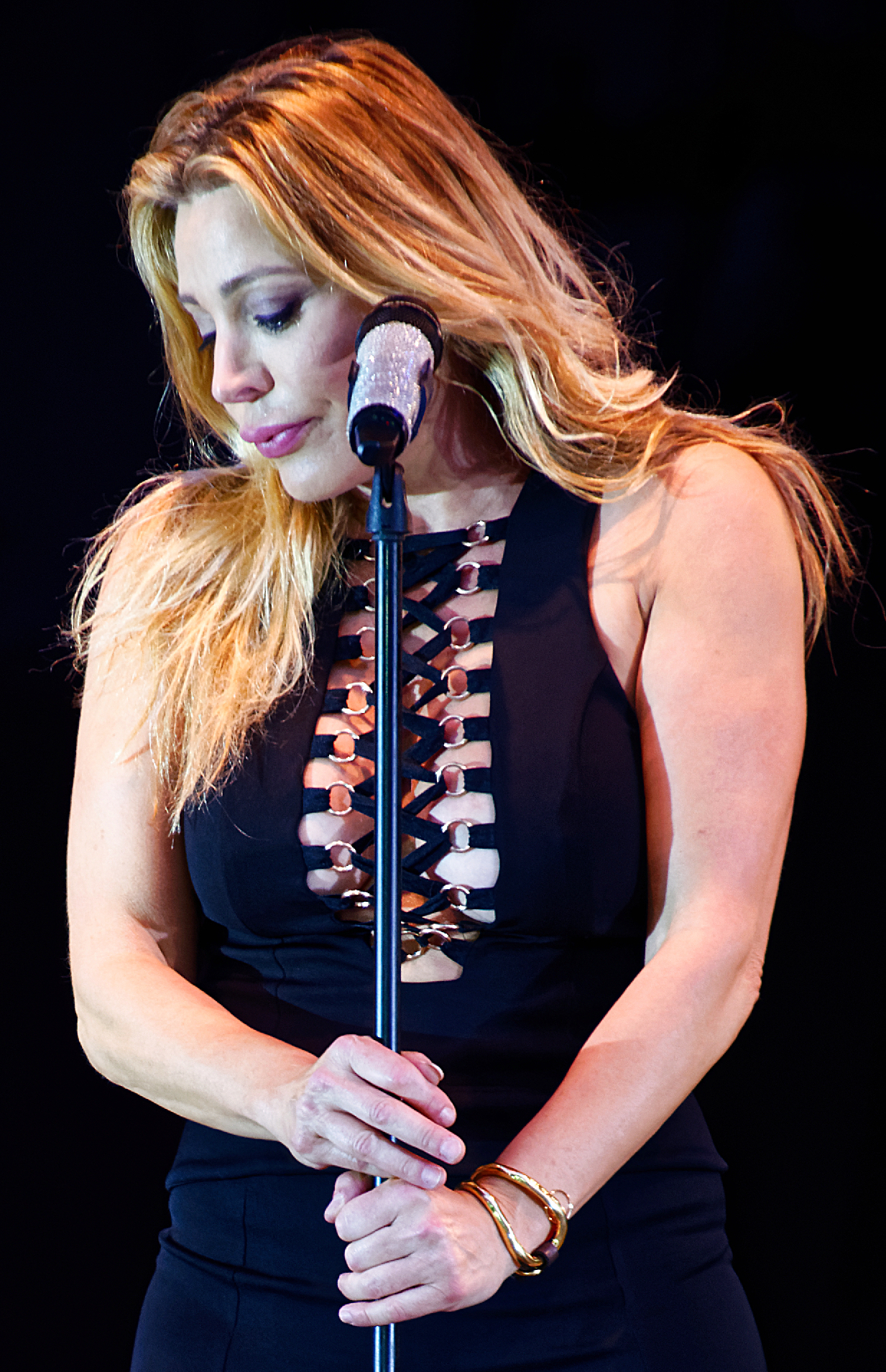
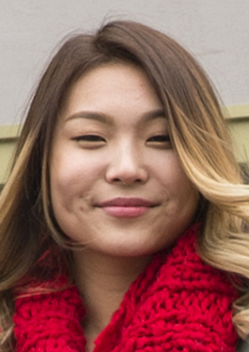
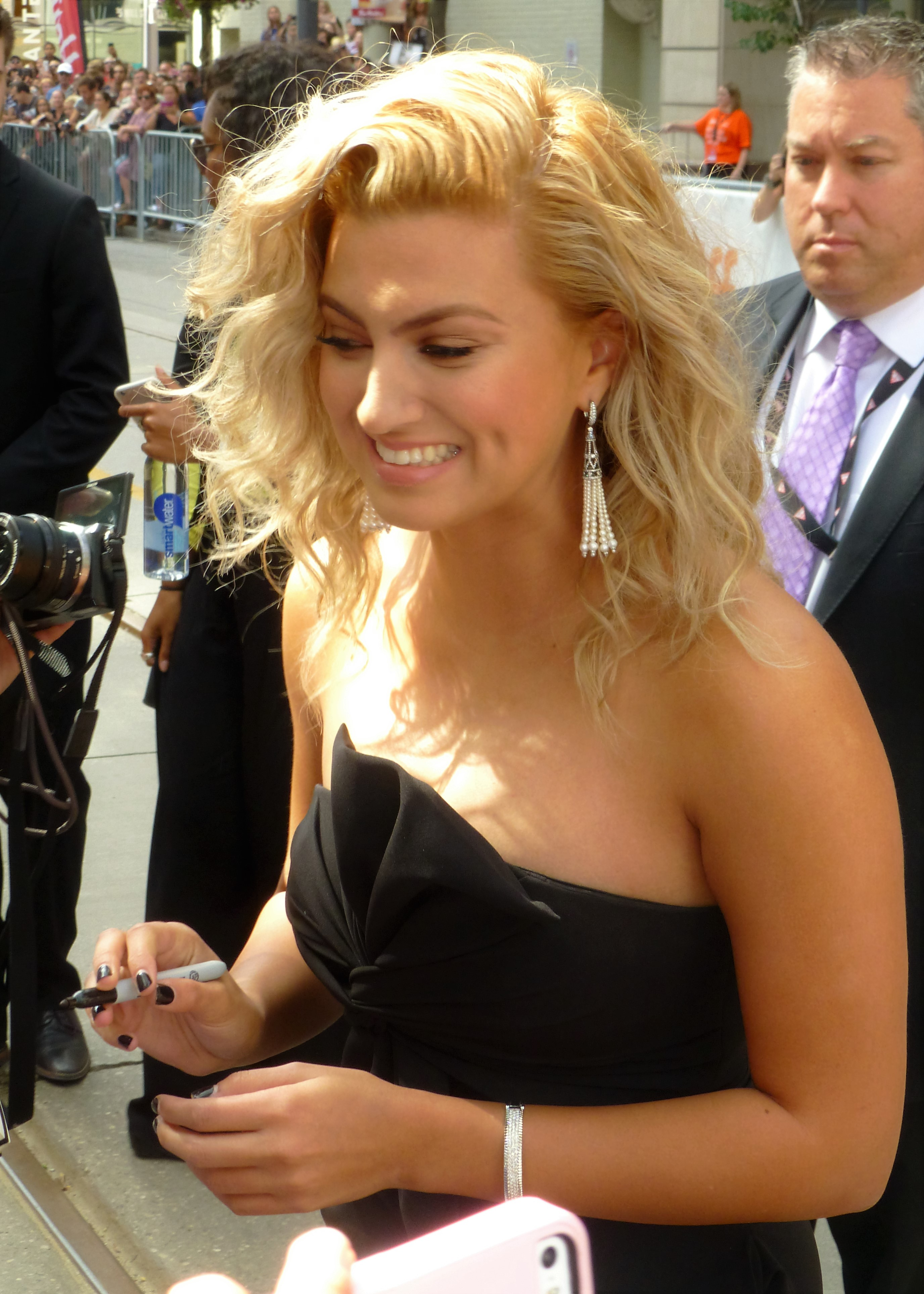
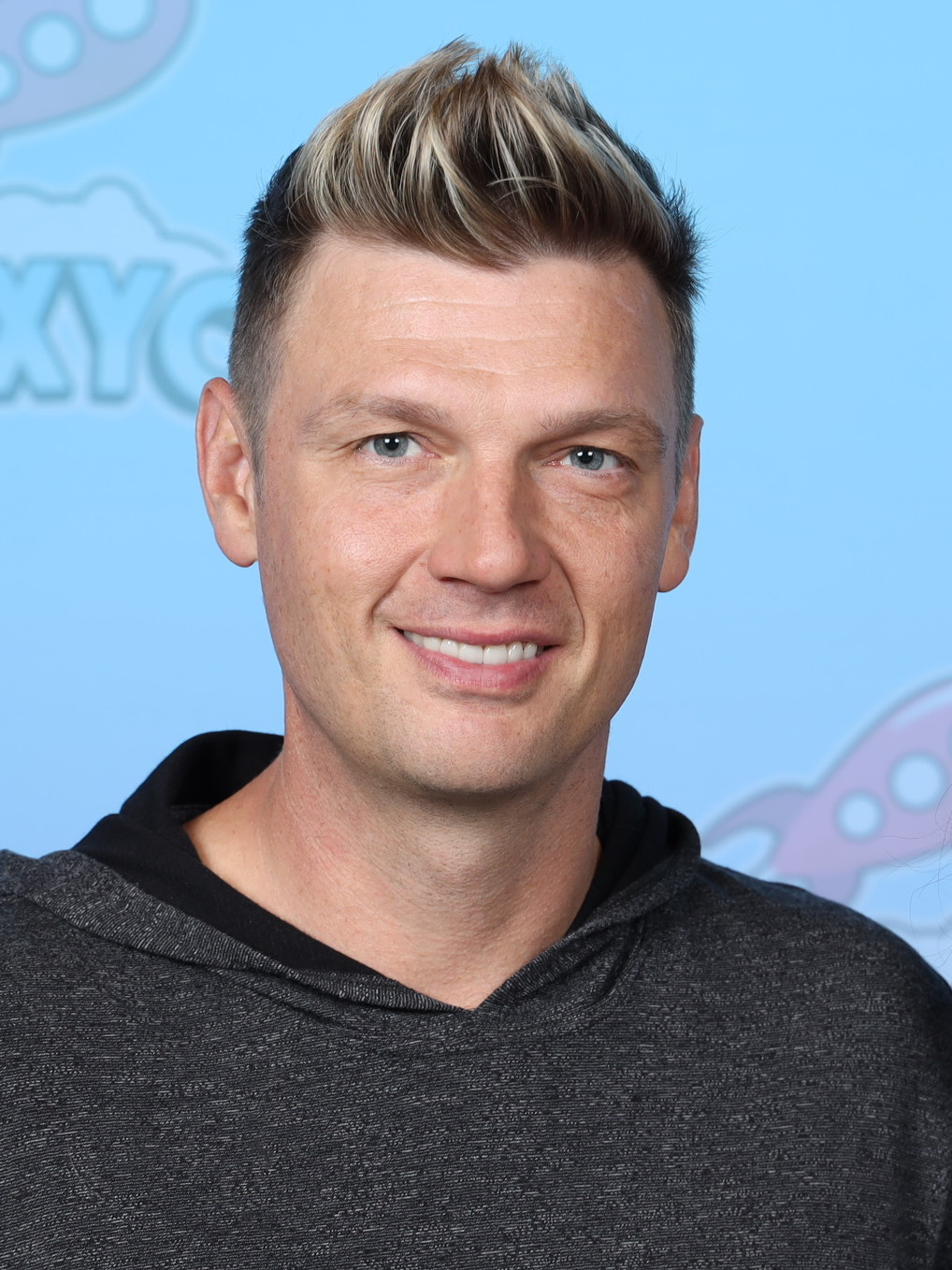
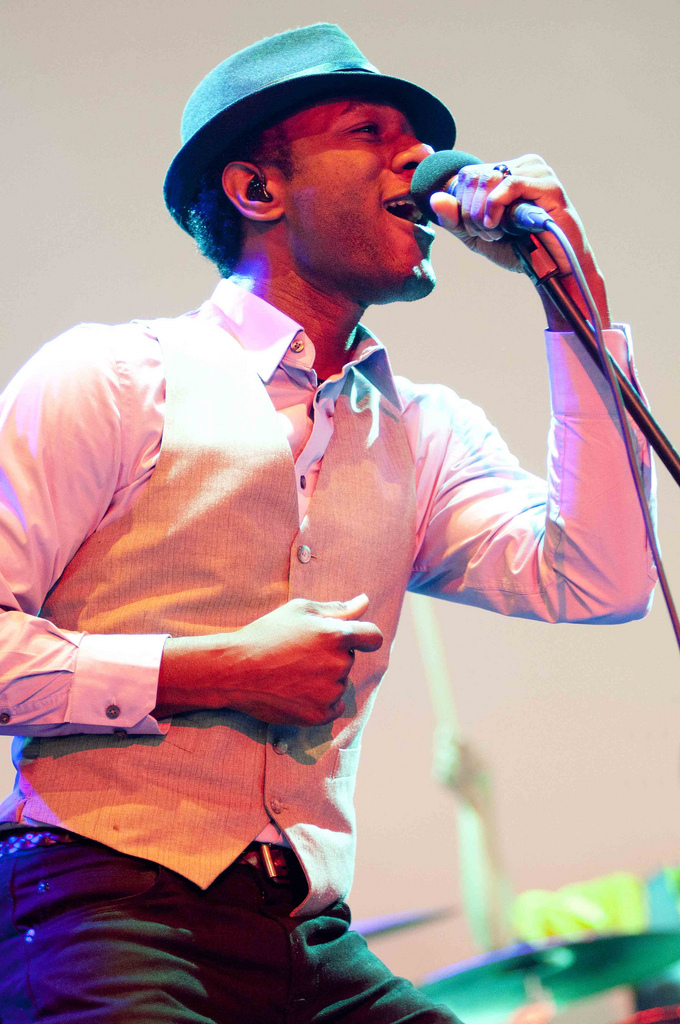
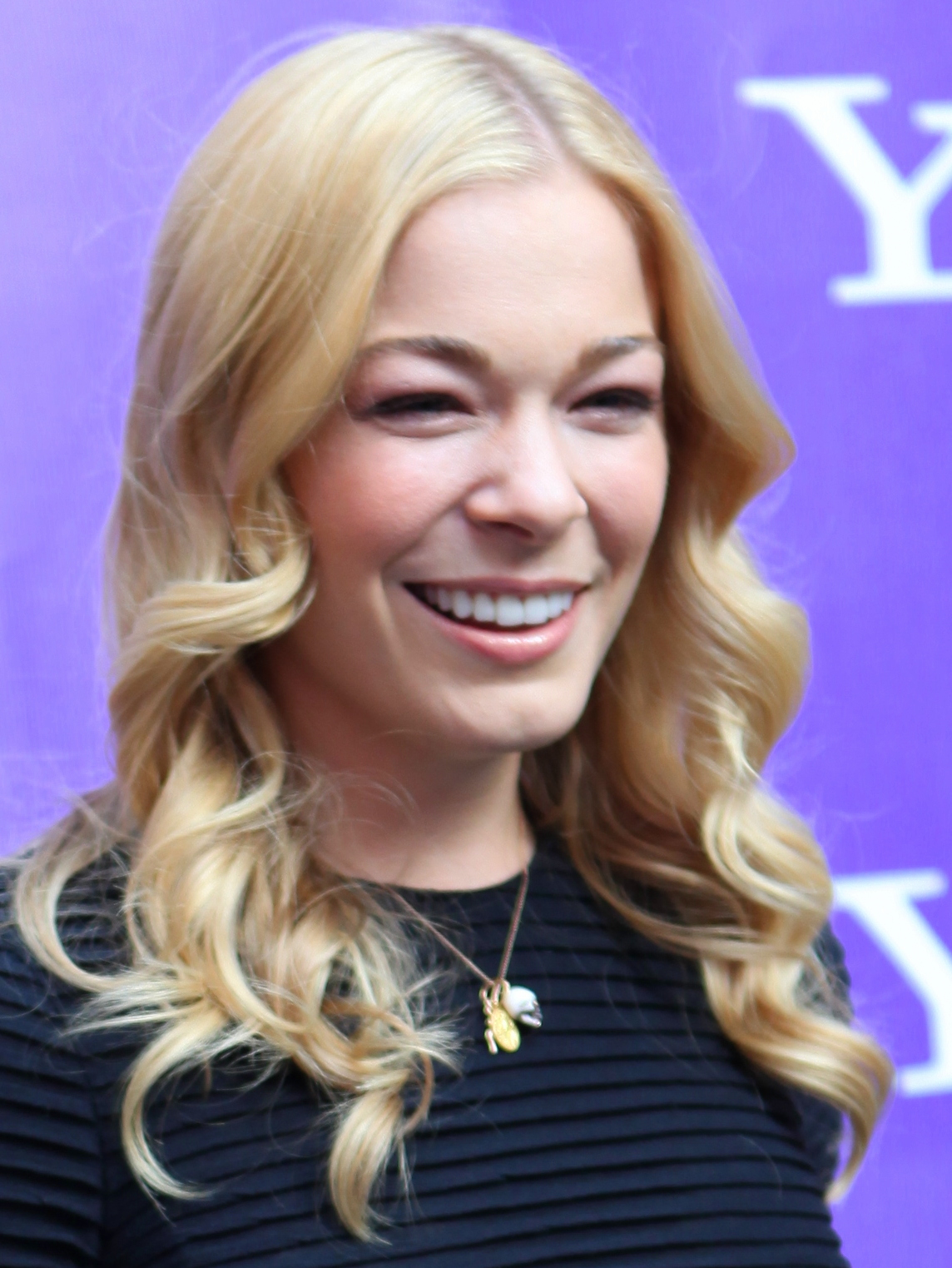
The celebrities who competed in the fourth season of The Masked Singer, pictured in order of elimination (L–R):

Busta Rhymes ("Dragon"), Mickey Rourke ("Gremlin"), Brian Austin Green ("Giraffe"), Mark Sanchez ("Baby Alien"), Wendy Williams ("Lips"), Bob Saget ("Squiggly Monster"), Clint and Lisa Hartman Black ("Snow Owls"), Lonzo Ball ("Whatchamacallit"), Paul Anka ("Broccoli"), Taylor Dayne ("Popcorn"), Chloe Kim ("Jellyfish"), Tori Kelly ("Seahorse"), Nick Carter ("Crocodile"), Aloe Blacc ("Mushroom"), and LeAnn Rimes ("Sun")

Not pictured: Dr. Elvis Francois ("Serpent")

== Episodes ==
=== Week 1 (September 23) ===
Performances on the first episode
#	Stage name	Song	Identity	Result
1	Sun	"Cuz I Love You" by Lizzo	undisclosed	SAFE
2	Giraffe	"Let's Get It Started" by Black Eyed Peas	undisclosed	SAFE
3	Popcorn	"What About Us" by P!nk	undisclosed	SAFE
4	Dragon	"Mama Said Knock You Out" by LL Cool J	Busta Rhymes	OUT
5	Snow Owls	"Say Something" by A Great Big World	undisclosed	SAFE
5	Snow Owls	"Say Something" by A Great Big World	undisclosed	SAFE

=== Week 2 (September 30) ===
Performances on the second episode
#	Stage name	Song	Identity	Result
1	Crocodile	"It's My Life" by Bon Jovi	undisclosed	SAFE
2	Baby Alien	"Faith" by George Michael	undisclosed	SAFE
3	Seahorse	"Only Girl (In the World)" by Rihanna	undisclosed	SAFE
4	Whatchamacallit	"I Wish" by Skee-Lo	undisclosed	SAFE
5	Serpent	"I'm Gonna Be (500 Miles)" by The Proclaimers	undisclosed	SAFE
6	Gremlin	"Stand by Me" by Ben E. King	Mickey Rourke	OUT

=== Week 3 (October 7) ===
Guest panelist performance: "Blurred Lines" by Robin Thicke performed by Joel McHale as "The Robin"

Performances on the third episode
#	Stage name	Song	Identity	Result
1	Popcorn	"Falling" by Harry Styles	undisclosed	SAFE
2	Giraffe	"Get Down on It" by Kool & the Gang	Brian Austin Green	OUT
3	Snow Owls	"Like I'm Gonna Lose You" by Meghan Trainor (feat. John Legend)	undisclosed	SAFE
3	Snow Owls	"Like I'm Gonna Lose You" by Meghan Trainor (feat. John Legend)	undisclosed	SAFE
4	Sun	"Praying" by Kesha	undisclosed	SAFE

=== Week 4 (October 14) ===
Performances on the fourth episode
#	Stage name	Song	Identity	Result
1	Serpent	"The Bones" by Maren Morris	undisclosed	SAFE
2	Crocodile	"Toxic" by Britney Spears	undisclosed	SAFE
3	Baby Alien	"It's Time" by Imagine Dragons	Mark Sanchez	OUT
4	Whatchamacallit	"Money Maker" by Ludacris (feat. Pharrell Williams)	undisclosed	SAFE
5	Seahorse	"My Heart Will Go On" by Celine Dion	undisclosed	SAFE

=== Week 5 (October 28) ===
Performances on the fifth episode
#	Stage name	Song	Identity	Result
1	Squiggly Monster	"Have You Ever Seen the Rain" by Creedence Clearwater Revival	undisclosed	SAFE
2	Mushroom	"This Woman's Work" by Maxwell	undisclosed	SAFE
3	Jellyfish	"Big Girls Don't Cry" by Fergie	undisclosed	SAFE
4	Broccoli	"The House is Rockin'/Whole Lotta Shakin' Goin' On" by Stevie Ray Vaughan/Jerry Lee Lewis	undisclosed	SAFE
5	Lips	"Native New Yorker" by Odyssey	Wendy Williams	OUT

=== Week 6 (November 4) ===
Guest panelist performance: "Memories" by Maroon 5 performed by Wayne Brady as "Mr. TV".

Performances on the sixth episode
#	Stage name	Song	Identity	Result
1	Mushroom	"If I Could Turn Back Time" by Cher	undisclosed	SAFE
2	Broccoli	"Hello" by Lionel Richie	undisclosed	SAFE
3	Squiggly Monster	"(I Can't Get No) Satisfaction" by The Rolling Stones	Bob Saget	OUT
4	Jellyfish	"Crazy" by Patsy Cline	undisclosed	SAFE

=== Week 7 (November 11) ===
Group performance: "Raise Your Glass" by P!nk

Performances on the seventh episode
#	Stage name	Song	Result	
1	Sun	"Piece of My Heart" by Janis Joplin	WIN	
2	Snow Owls	"The Prayer" by Andrea Bocelli & Celine Dion	RISK	
3	Popcorn	"Domino" by Jessie J	RISK	
Smackdown			Identity	Result
1	Snow Owls	"Because You Loved Me" by Celine Dion	Clint Black	OUT
1	Snow Owls	"Because You Loved Me" by Celine Dion	Lisa Hartman Black	OUT
2	Popcorn	"(Everything I Do) I Do It for You" by Bryan Adams	undisclosed	SAFE

=== Week 8 (November 18) ===
Performances on the eighth episode
#	Stage name	Song	Identity	Result
1	Seahorse	"...Baby One More Time" by Britney Spears	undisclosed	SAFE
2	Crocodile	"Bleeding Love" by Leona Lewis	undisclosed	SAFE
3	Whatchamacallit	"Lean Back" by Terror Squad ft. Fat Joe & Remy Ma	Lonzo Ball	OUT
4	Serpent	"Cool" by Jonas Brothers	Dr. Elvis Francois	OUT

=== Week 9 (November 26) ===
Group performance: "I Want You Back" by The Jackson 5

Performances on the ninth episode
#	Stage name	Song	Result	
1	Jellyfish	"Don't Start Now" by Dua Lipa	WIN	
2	Mushroom	"Unconditionally" by Katy Perry	RISK	
3	Broccoli	"Old Time Rock & Roll" by Bob Seger	RISK	
Smackdown			Identity	Result
1	Broccoli	"Take Me Down" by Alabama	Paul Anka	OUT
2	Mushroom	"A Song for You" by Donny Hathaway	undisclosed	SAFE

=== Week 10 (December 2) ===
Group performance: "Take On Me" by A-ha

Guest panelist performance: "I Will Survive" by Gloria Gaynor performed by Craig Robinson

Performances on the tenth episode
#	Group	Stage name	Song	Identity	Result
1	B	Seahorse	"That's What I Like" by Bruno Mars	Tori Kelly	OUT
2	B	Crocodile	"I Don't Want to Miss a Thing" by Aerosmith	undisclosed	WIN
3	C	Mushroom	"Valerie" by Amy Winehouse	undisclosed	WIN
4	C	Jellyfish	"Stay" by Rihanna ft. Mikky Ekko	Chloe Kim	OUT
5	A	Popcorn	"Better Be Good to Me" by Tina Turner	Taylor Dayne	OUT
6	A	Sun	"When the Party's Over" by Billie Eilish	undisclosed	WIN

=== Week 11 (December 16) – Finale ===
Group performance: "Christmas (Baby Please Come Home)" by Darlene Love

Performances on the final episode
#	Stage name	Song	Identity	Result
1	Crocodile	"Open Arms" by Journey	Nick Carter	THIRD PLACE
2	Mushroom	"I Wish" by Stevie Wonder	Aloe Blacc	RUNNER-UP
3	Sun	"The Story" by Brandi Carlile	LeAnn Rimes	WINNER

== Ratings ==
Viewership and ratings per episode of The Masked Singer (American TV series) season 4
No.	Title	Air date	Timeslot (ET)	Rating (18–49)	Viewers (millions)	DVR (18–49)	DVR viewers (millions)	Total (18–49)	Total viewers (millions)	Ref.
0	"Special Season Four Sneak Peek"	September 13, 2020	Sunday 8:00 p.m.	1.6	5.57	—N/a	—N/a	—N/a	—N/a	
1	"The Season Premiere - The Masks Return"	September 23, 2020	Wednesday 8:00 p.m.	1.6	5.92	0.8	2.88	2.4	8.80	
2	"The Group B Premiere - Six More Masks"	September 30, 2020	Wednesday 8:00 p.m.	1.9	6.94	0.7	2.48	2.6	9.42	
3	"The Group A Play Offs - Famous Masked Words"	October 7, 2020	Wednesday 8:00 p.m.	1.5	6.01	0.8	2.38	2.3	8.39	
4	"The Group B Play Offs - Cloudy with a Chance of Clues"	October 14, 2020	Wednesday 8:00 p.m.	1.7	6.50	—N/a	—N/a	—N/a	—N/a	
5	"The Group C Premiere - Masked But Not Least"	October 28, 2020	Wednesday 8:00 p.m.	1.6	6.20	0.7	2.08	2.3	8.28	
6	"The Group C Play Offs - Funny You Should Mask"	November 4, 2020	Wednesday 8:00 p.m.	1.7	6.57	0.7	2.14	2.4	8.71	
7	"The Group A Finals - The Masked Frontier"	November 11, 2020	Wednesday 8:00 p.m.	1.6	6.07	0.6	2.03	2.2	8.10	
8	"The Group B Finals - The Mask Chance Saloon"	November 18, 2020	Wednesday 8:00 p.m.	1.7	6.42	0.7	2.13	2.3	8.55	
9	"The Group C Finals - The Masks Give Thanks"	November 26, 2020	Thursday 8:00 p.m.	3.5	11.42	0.7	2.16	4.2	13.58	
10	"The Semi Finals - The Super Six"	December 2, 2020	Wednesday 8:00 p.m.	1.6	6.57	0.6	1.92	2.2	8.49	
Special	"The Holiday Sing-a-Long"	December 9, 2020	Wednesday 8:00 p.m.	1.1	4.89	0.3	1.26	1.4	6.14	
11	"Road to the Finals"	December 16, 2020	Wednesday 8:00 p.m.	1.3	5.44	—N/a	—N/a	—N/a	—N/a	
12	"The Season 4 Finale - Last Mask Standing"	December 16, 2020	Wednesday 9:00 p.m.	1.8	7.41	—N/a	—N/a	—N/a	—N/a	
