= Juan Pablo Carrasco =

Chilean footballer (born 1992)

Personal information
- Full name: Juan Pablo Carrasco Celis
- Date of birth: 11 August 1992 (age 34)
- Place of birth: Rancagua, Chile
- Height: 1.73 m (5 ft 8 in)
- Position: Forward

Youth career
- O'Higgins

Senior career*
Years	Team	Apps	(Gls)
2008–2014	O'Higgins	21	(2)
2012	→ Deportes Puerto Montt (loan)	8	(0)
2013	→ Deportes Valdivia (loan)	20	(8)
2013–2014	→ Deportes Puerto Montt (loan)	15	(1)
2015–2016	Deportes Rengo	–	(–)
2017	AC Colina	3	(4)
2019–2021	Husqvarna FF		
- * Club domestic league appearances and goals as of 6 June 2021

Juan Pablo Carrasco Celis (born 11 August 1992) is a Chilean footballer who last played for Swedish Division 2 Östra Götaland side Husqvarna FF as a forward.

== Career ==
After playing for both Deportes Rengo and AC Colina in the Chilean Tercera A, Carrasco emigrated to Sweden and signed with Swedish Division 2 Östra Götaland side Husqvarna FF. In that club, he coincided with his compatriots Elvis Acuña, Julio Inaí and Mayckol Silva.
