= Silk events =

- Formation: 2005
- Headquarters: Kampala, Uganda
- Founder: Elvis Sekyanzi
- Website: www.silkevents.co.ug

Silk events is a full-service event management agency with branches in Uganda and Rwanda.

== History ==
The company was founded in 2005. It has since organised a number of events in Uganda including corporate events, music concerts, and branding events. It has organised events for musicians like Beenie Man, Demarco (musician), Sisqó, Sean Paul Maurice Kirya, Grace Nakimera, and the Miss Uganda event.
