= Elvis Browne =

Kittitian football manager (born 1961)

Elvis Browne (9 February 1961 – 20 September 2011) was a Kittitian football manager.

== Early life ==
Browne grew up in La Guérite, Saint Kitts and Nevis. He played cricket as a child. He attended De Village Primary School in Saint Kitts and Nevis. After that, he attended Basseterre High School in Saint Kitts and Nevis. He studied carpentry.

== Playing career ==
Browne played for the Saint Kitts and Nevis national football team.

== Managerial career ==
Browne managed the Saint Kitts and Nevis national football team. He also managed the Saint Kitts and Nevis women's national football team. He founded the LIME/Elvis “Star” Browne Football School of Excellence.

== Personal life ==
Browne was married. He was nicknamed "Star". He was the son of Margaret Browne.
