= Elvis Toci =

Albanian sport manager

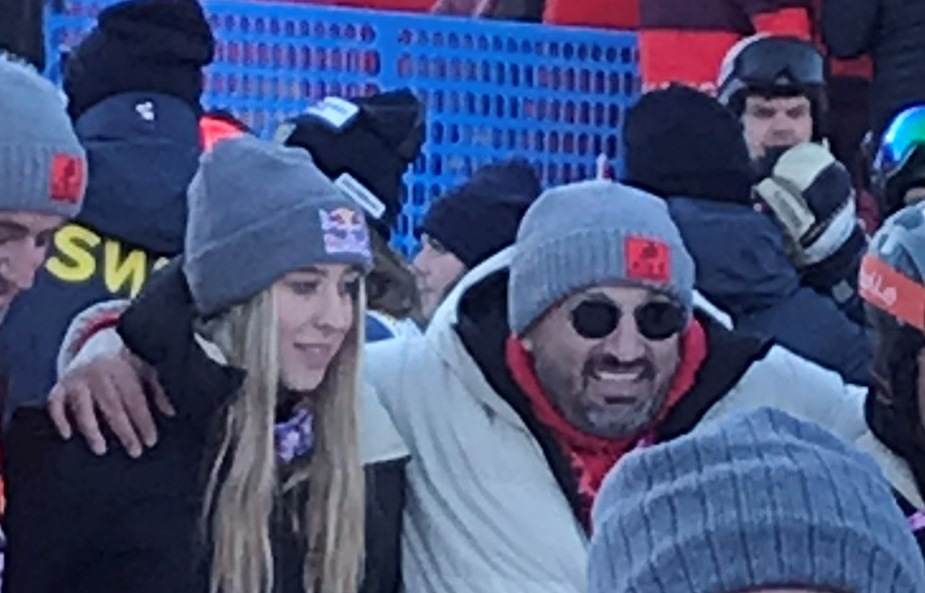
- Toci (right) with skier Lara Colturi, San Vigilio di Marebbe, 2023
- Born: 1971 (age 54–55); Tirana, Albania
- Occupation: Sport manager

Elvis Toci (born 1971) is an Albanian sport manager and president of the Albanian Ski Federation.

In addition to being a 15-year ski enthusiast, Toci has a career as an Associated Press reporter, businessman, developer and real estate investor. He is a graduate of the University of Bucharest and holds a postgraduate degree from Lancashire University. He is married and has two children.

Elvis Toci featured in news reports at the beginning of the 2022–23 FIS Alpine Ski World Cup when he was present at some races of the White Circus (Ski World Cup), to follow the 16-year-old Italian naturalized Albanian Lara Colturi, an alpine skier.

He is an honorary consul of Romania.
