= Elvis Antoine =

Mauritian footballer

Elvis Antoine is a Mauritian footballer who played as left back at the Fire Brigade SC in the 1980s. He scored in the penalty shootout to give the victory to the Mauritian team in the Indian Ocean Games final in 1985. With Sunrise Flacq United, he reached the first round of African Cup of Champions Clubs in 1988.

== Coaching career ==
He pursued his career in football as a coach, from 2000 to 2003 with the Faucon Flacq where he won the Republic Cup in 2003. He then became co-coach of the national team with Rajesh Gunesh in December 2003 until March 2005.
