= Elvis Acuña =

Chilean footballer

Personal information
- Full name: Elvis Eduardo Acuña Medina
- Date of birth: 4 February 1991 (age 35)
- Place of birth: Nacimiento, Chile
- Height: 1.87 m (6 ft 2 in)
- Position: Centre-back

Youth career
- 2008–2009: Huachipato

Senior career*
| Years | Team | Apps | (Gls) |
| 2009–2012 | Huachipato | 8 | (0) |
| 2012 | → Deportes Valdivia (loan) | – | (–) |
| 2013 | Deportes Valdivia | 13 | (0) |
| 2013–2017 | Ñublense | 8 | (0) |
| 2013–2014 | → Deportes Valdivia (loan) | 18 | (1) |
| 2014–2016 | → Deportes Pintana (loan) | 59 | (3) |
| 2017 | Malleco Unido | 19 | (0) |
| 2018 | Råslätts SK | | |
| 2019–2021 | Husqvarna FF | | |

International career
| 2010 | Chile U20 | | |
- * Club domestic league appearances and goals

Elvis Eduardo Acuña Medina (born 4 February 1991) is a Chilean former footballer who played as a centre-back. Besides Chile, he played in Sweden.

== Club career ==
Born in Nacimiento, Chile, Acuña began his career with Huachipato in the Chilean top division and has mainly played for clubs from the Southern zone in his country of birth at almost all divisions. In 2012, he was loaned to Deportes Valdivia in the Tercera A and had a trial with Romanian clubs Concordia Chiajna and Dinamo București, alongside three fellows. Back in Chile, he took part of the Huachipato squad that won the 2012 Torneo Clausura.

After ending his contract with Huachipato, he rejoined Deportes Valdivia in the first half of 2013. In the second half of 2013, he signed with Ñublense for four seasons and was immediately loaned to Deportes Valdivia again. The next two seasons, he played on loan for Deportes Pintana.

In 2016–17, he played for Ñublense, but he was kept away from the squad due to indiscipline in March 2017.

After ending his contract with Ñublense, he joined Malleco Unido.

In 2018, he moved to Sweden and joined Råslätts SK in the Division 2 Östra Götaland, where he coincided with his compatriot Julio Inaí, a former teammate in Malleco Unido. The next year, he switched to Husqvarna FF, coinciding with another two compatriots, Juan Pablo Carrasco and Mayckol Silva.

== International career ==
In 2010, Acuña represented Chile U20 in friendlies against clubs and national teams such as Peru with views to the 2011 South American Championship. In addition, he served as sparring of the Chile senior team led by Marcelo Bielsa.

== Personal life ==
As a child, Acuña also played basketball, volleyball and did track and field, cycling and gymnastics.
