= Elvis Levi =

NZ rugby union player

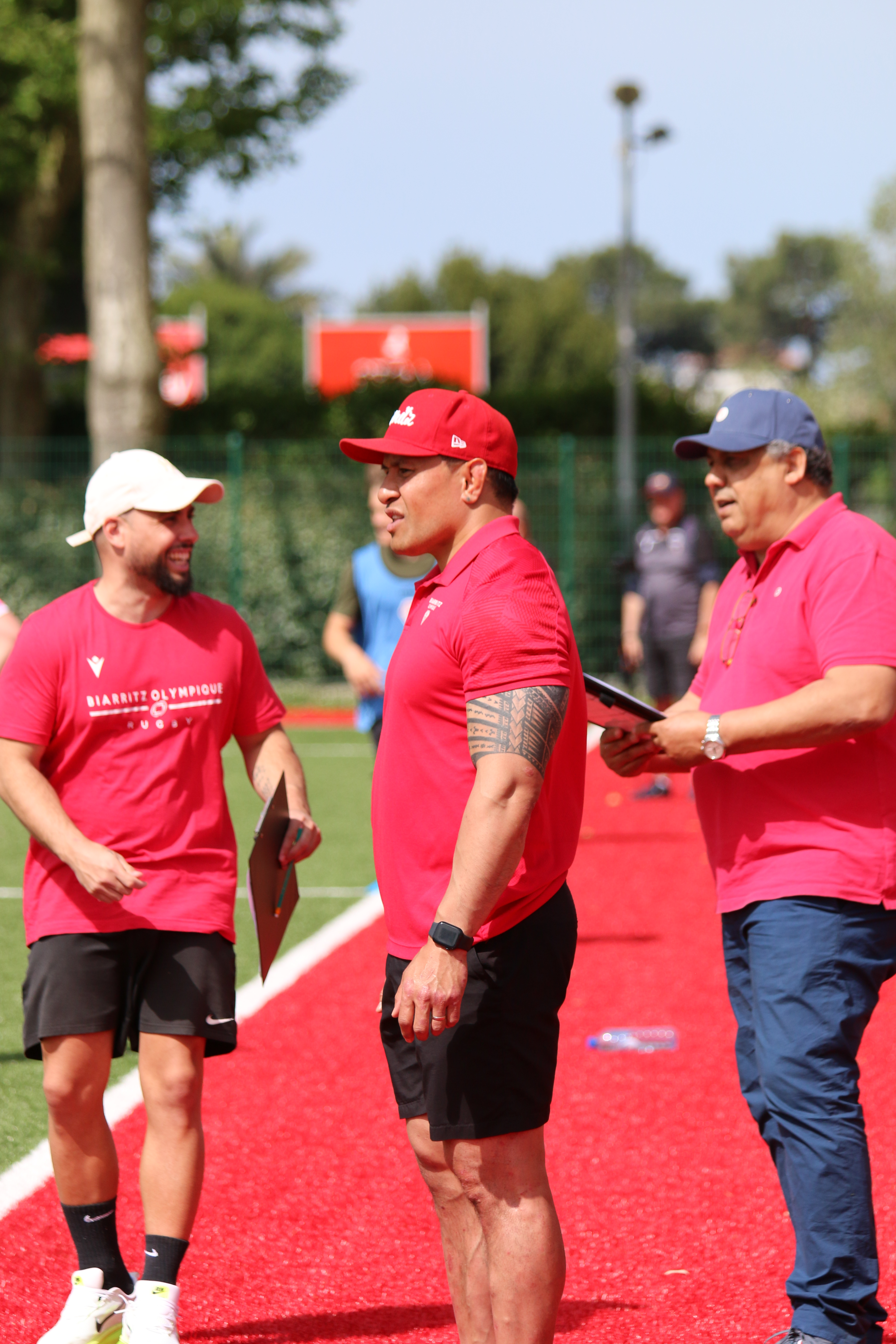
- Jonas Barberteguy, Serge Blanco, and Elvis Levi
- Born: 21 February 1987 (age 39) Samoa
- Height: 181 cm (5 ft 11 in)
- Weight: 110 kg (243 lb)
- School: King's College, Auckland

Rugby union career
- Position: Hooker
Senior career
Years	Team	Apps	(Points)
2011–14	AS Béziers	64	(10)
2014–20	Biarritz Olympique	98	(45)
2020–	US Dax	49	(40)
Super Rugby
Years	Team	Apps	(Points)
2011	Brumbies	1	(0)

Elvis Levi (born 21 February 1987) is a New Zealand professional rugby union player.

Levi was born in Samoa and grew up in Auckland, where he attended King's College. He was named after the famous singer by his Elvis obsessed parents, maths teacher Tautia and accountant Faamau.

Moving to Canberra in 2007, Levi found a place in the Brumbies Academy and was then a junior Waratah in 2008. He was playing his rugby for Sydney club Penrith when he got called up by the Brumbies in 2011 to replace injured hooker Huia Edmonds and came on off the bench to make his Super Rugby debut against the Western Force at Canberra Stadium.

Levi has plied his trade in France since 2011 after being recruited by AS Béziers.
