= Elvis Francois =

American orthopedic surgeon and viral sensation

- Born: 1985 (age 40–41)
- Occupations: Orthopedic surgeon Singer

Elvis Francois (born 1985), also known as Dr. Elvis, is an American orthopedic surgeon and amateur singer known for making viral videos of his singing before and during the COVID-19 pandemic.

== Career ==
Francois was named after Elvis Presley, of whom his mother was a fan.

In April 2020, Francois released an EP titled "Music is Medicine" to raise funds for COVID-19 relief. It was recorded, mixed and mastered by Zach Zurn at Carpet Booth Studios in Rochester, Minnesota.

Francois and William Robinson, known as the "Singing Surgeons", performed "God Bless America" during the NBC Special "Back Home Again" on May 24, and performed "The Star-Spangled Banner" at the 2020 Indianapolis 500.

Francois completed a 5-year residency at the Mayo Clinic in June 2020, and completed a 3-month spine surgery fellowship at Harvard Medical School in November 2020.

In 2020, Francois appeared in season four of The Masked Singer as "Serpent" who was the first character with animatronic parts. He was eliminated in the eighth episode alongside Lonzo Ball as "Whatchamacallit".

== Personal life ==
Francois was named to the People Magazine "Sexiest Man Alive" list for 2020.

== Filmography ==
Year	Title	Role	Notes
2020	The Masked Singer	Serpent	Season 4; Eliminated in Episode 8
