= Elvis Mihailenko =

Latvian boxer (born 1976)

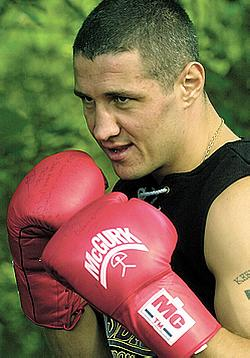
Mihailenko in 2004

Elvis Mihailenko is a Latvian professional boxer, the first Latvian National boxing champion amongst professionals and first ever professional fighter from Latvia who won any of the major titles, as WBA Intercontinental champion (on 2002-10-03, in Madrid, beating on points Spaniard Alejandro Lakatos) and EBU-EU (European Union) (on 2004-06-11, in Copenhagen, beating on points Swede Giovanni Alvarez), and later defended it once more. He fought at the light-heavyweight division. Mihaiļenko never hired a big promoter, allowing him to travel around Europe to enjoy the training camps in the best gyms. He sparred with a number of great fighters, including such World champions as Joe Calzaghe, Mikkel Kessler, Zsolt Erdei, and David Haye.

Mihaiļenko was born on September 13, 1976, in Jūrmala, Latvia, a town near the Latvian capital of Riga. As an amateur he had a 71–14 record and won the National Championships in 1997 at light-heavyweight. He was also a member of the national boxing team and represented Latvia in number of tournaments. In 1998 he won the European Full-contact Kickboxing Championships and also the Latvian Kickboxing championship in 1998 and 1999.

In 2000 he turned professional, signing with Peacock Promotion in Canning Town, East End of London. He also sparred and trained in Universum-Box Promotion, in Hamburg, Germany. His professional record was 18-1-1. In 2008 founded his own promotional company- Fighter Elvis Promotion

Graduated from the University College of Economics and Culture (EKA) in Riga as a translator/interpreter of the English language.

He currently is a personal trainer and boxing commentator on Viasat Sport Baltic channel. He was named by his father in honour of Elvis Presley.
