= Elvis Sekyanzi =

Ugandan businessman (born 1975)

- Born: c. 1975 (age 50–51); Uganda
- Education: London School of Electronics (BS)
- Occupation: Businessman
- Years active: 1995 — present

Elvis Sekyanzi, also known as Elvis Sekyanzi Wavamunno, is a Ugandan businessman, entrepreneur and qualified sound engineer. In 2012, he was reported to be one of the wealthiest Ugandans.

== Early life and education ==
Sekyanzi was born in Uganda c. 1975. His father is Ugandan millionaire and entrepreneur Gordon Wavamunno. He studied sound engineering at the London School of Electronics.

== Businesses and investments ==
Sekyanzi owns a number of entertainment-related businesses. He is also a director and manager in some of his father's companies, including WBS Television, Wavah Water, and Wavah FM. The businesses that he owns include Club Silk, a night club in the Bugolobi suburb of Kampala, and Silk Events, an entertainment management company with branches in Uganda and neighboring Rwanda. He is reported to also own a Club Silk in London, United Kingdom.

== Net worth ==
According to the New Vision newspaper, Sekyanzi had a net worth of about US$8 million in 2012.
