= Elvis Banyihwabe =

Burundian footballer

Personal information
- Date of birth: 15 April 1983 (age 43)
- Place of birth: Bujumbura, Burundi
- Height: 1.75 m (5 ft 9 in)
- Position: Midfielder

Senior career*
Years	Team	Apps	(Gls)
- BV Veendam
2007–2008	VV Berkum		
2008–2009	DOS Kampen		
2009–2010	Be Quick '28		
2011–2012	Bootle		
2012–2013	Prescot Cables		
2013	Ashton Athletic		(2)
2013–2014	Congleton Town		
2014	AFC Liverpool	5	(0)

International career^{‡}
2007	Burundi	2	(0)
- * Club domestic league appearances and goals as of 00:00, 17 March 2019 (UTC) ‡ National team caps and goals as of 00:00, 17 March 2019 (UTC)

Elvis Banyihwabe (born 15 April 1983) is a former Burundian international footballer who played twice for the Burundi national team, as a midfielder.

== Club career ==
Born in the Burundian capital of Bujumbura, Banyihwabe fled to the Netherlands in 2001 as a result of the Burundian Civil War. During his time in the Netherlands, Banyihwabe played for BV Veendam, VV Berkum, DOS Kampen and Be Quick '28.

Following his time in Dutch football, Banyihwabe moved to England, playing for Bootle, Prescot Cables, Ashton Athletic, Congleton Town and AFC Liverpool.

== International career ==
On 25 March 2007, Banyihwabe made his debut for Burundi in a 1–0 2008 Africa Cup of Nations qualification loss against Botswana.
