= Elvis Santana =

Brazilian footballer (born 1983)

Personal information
- Full name: Elvis da Silva Santana
- Date of birth: 11 July 1983 (age 43)
- Place of birth: Brazil
- Height: 1.77 m (5 ft 10 in)
- Position: Midfielder

Youth career
- CFA Amazonia

Senior career*
Years	Team	Apps	(Gls)
2000–2002	CFA Amazonia		
2002	Östersunds FK	5	(0)
2003–2004	Hammarby IF	2	(0)
2004	→ Hammarby TFF	12	(3)
2005	Paulista		
2006	Vilhena		
2006–2007	Vila Aurora		
2006	→ FC Ascona (loan)		
2007	Bodens BK	3	(1)
2008	Akropolis IF	8	(1)
2009–2010	Väsby United	51	(7)
2011–2013	Assyriska FF	22	(2)
- * Club domestic league appearances and goals as of 9 July 2012

Elvis da Silva Santana (born 11 July 1983) is a Brazilian footballer who plays as a midfielder.
