= Elvis González (footballer) =

Colombian footballer (born 1982)

Personal information
- Full name: Elvis Javier González Herrera
- Date of birth: 20 November 1982 (age 43)
- Place of birth: San Andrés, Córdoba, Colombia
- Height: 1.74 m (5 ft 9 in)
- Position: Left-back

Youth career
- Independiente Santa Fe

Senior career*
Years	Team	Apps	(Gls)
2004–2005	Independiente Santa Fe	4	(0)
2006–2011	Cúcuta Deportivo	136	(3)
2011	Deportivo Pereira	15	(0)
2012–2014	La Equidad	31	(0)
2015	Atlético Huila	33	(0)
2016	Rionegro Águilas	8	(0)
2016	Real Cartagena	12	(1)
2017–2018	Jaguares de Córdoba	58	(0)
2019	Real Cartagena	31	(1)
2020–2021	Atlético Huila	23	(0)
Total		351	(5)

International career
2007	Colombia	3	(0)
- * Club domestic league appearances and goals

Elvis Javier González Herrera (born 20 February 1982) is a Colombian former professional footballer who plays as a left-back.

== Honors ==
Cúcuta Deportivo

- Primera A: 2006–II
