= Shropshire =

County in England

- Ceremonial county
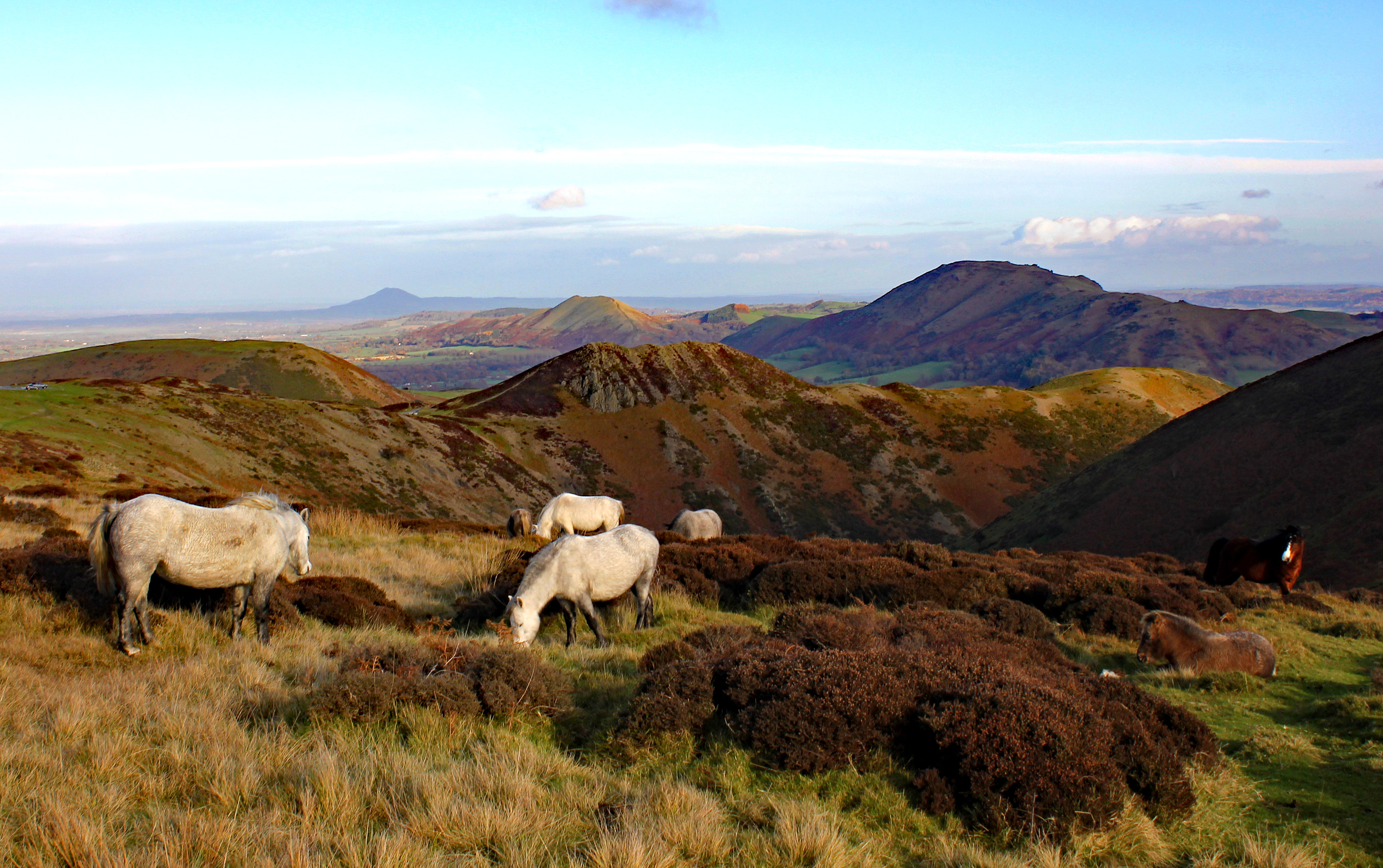
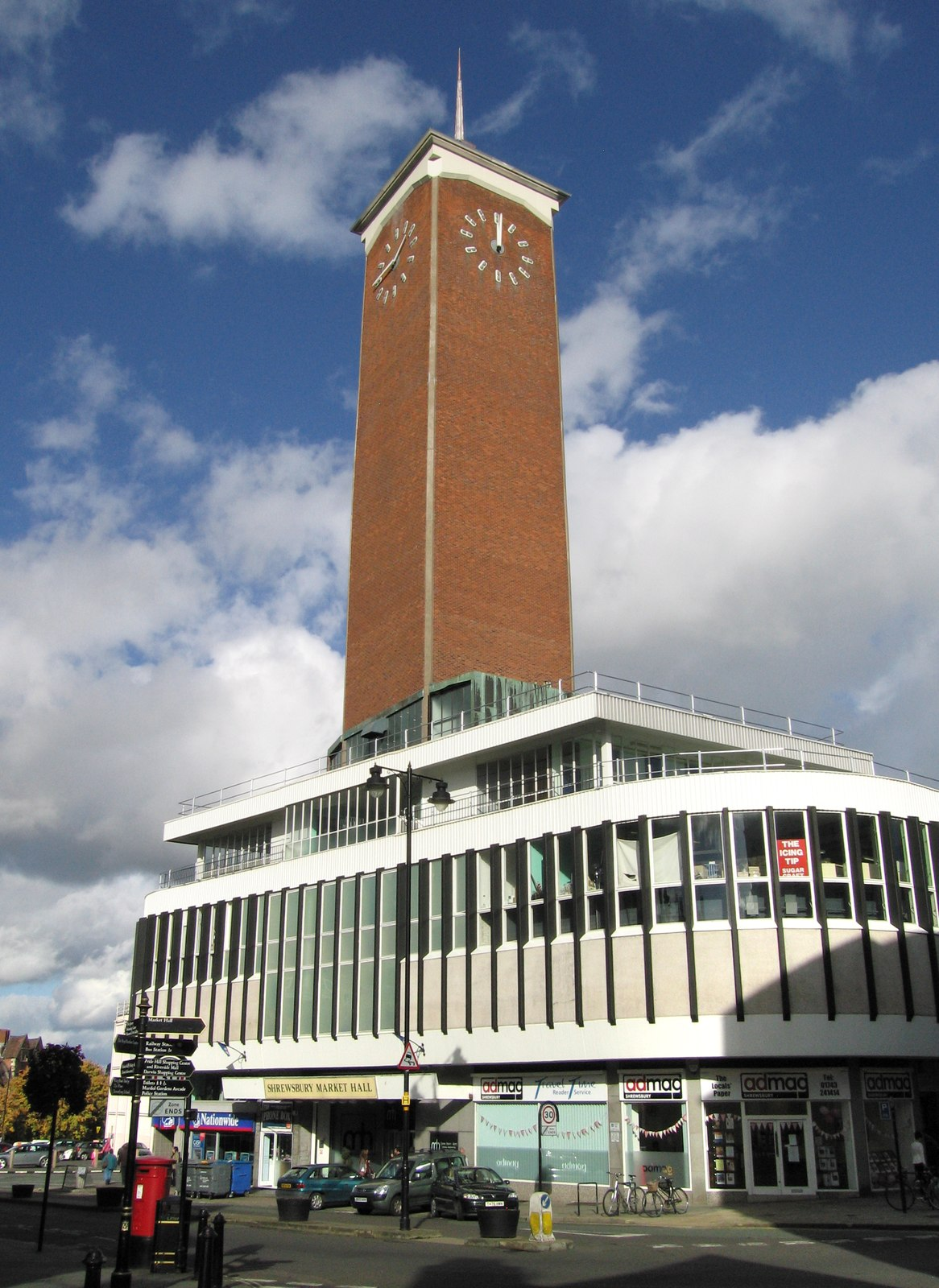
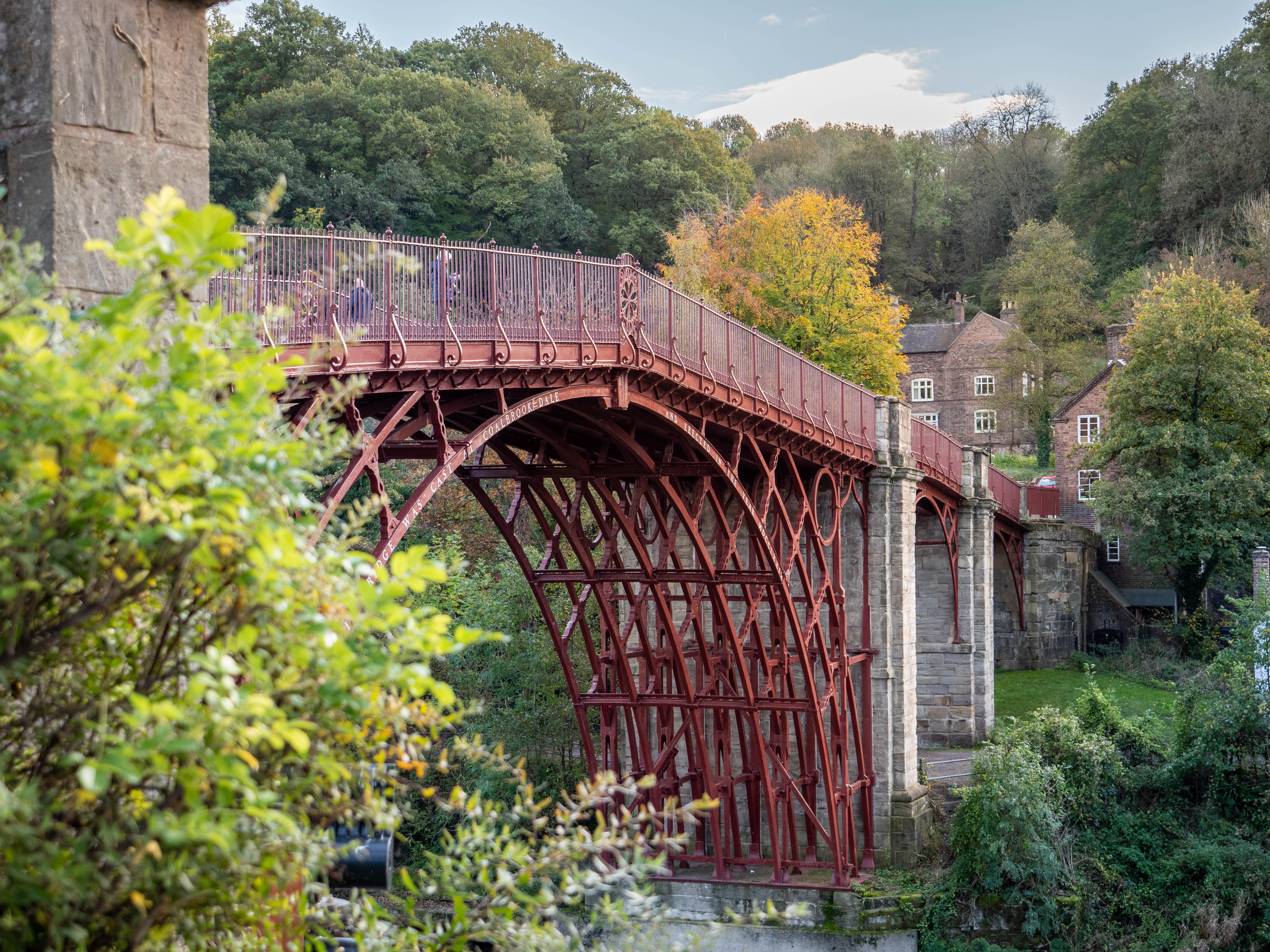
- The Townbrook Valley from the Long Mynd; the clock tower of Shrewsbury Market Hall; and the Iron Bridge, Ironbridge

- Shropshire within England
- Coordinates: 52°37′N 2°43′W
- Sovereign state: United Kingdom
- Constituent country: England
- Region: West Midlands
- Established: Ancient
- Time zone: UTC+0 (GMT)
  - Summer (DST): UTC+1 (BST)
- UK Parliament: List of MPs
- Police: West Mercia Police
- Ceremonial county
- Lord Lieutenant: Anna Turner
- High Sheriff: Katherine Elizabeth Anne Tanne
- Area: 3,488 km^{2} (1,347 sq mi)
  - Rank: 13th of 48
- Population (2024): 528,407
  - Rank: 41st of 48
  - Density: 152/km^{2} (390/sq mi)
- Unitary authorities
- Councils: Shropshire Council; Telford and Wrekin Council
- Districts
- Districts of Shropshire; Unitary
- Districts: 1. Shropshire; 2. Telford and Wrekin

Shropshire (/ˈʃrɒpʃər, -ʃɪər/; abbreviated Salop) is a ceremonial county in the West Midlands of England, on the border with Wales. It is bordered by Cheshire to the north-east, Staffordshire to the east, Worcestershire to the south-east, Herefordshire to the south, and the Welsh principal areas of Powys and Wrexham to the west and north-west respectively. The largest settlement is Telford, while Shrewsbury is the county town.

Shropshire has an area of 3,487 km^{2} (1,346 square miles) and had an estimated population of 528,407 in 2024. Telford in the east and Shrewsbury in the centre are the largest towns. Shropshire is otherwise rural, and contains market towns such as Oswestry in the north-west, Market Drayton in the north-east, Bridgnorth in the south-east, and Ludlow in the south. For local government purposes the county comprises the unitary authority areas of Shropshire and Telford and Wrekin. The county historically had a large exclave around Halesowen and Oldbury, which are now in the West Midlands county.

The south-west and far west of the county are upland. The Shropshire Hills occupy most of the south-west and include the Stiperstones, Clee Hills, Long Mynd plateau, and the Wenlock Edge escarpment. Together with the Wrekin, which stands isolated to the west of Telford, they have been designated a national landscape. To their west is the upland Clun Forest, and in the far north-west of the county are the Oswestry uplands. The north of the county is a plain, and the far north contains Whixall Moss, part of a national nature reserve. The south-east is a sandstone plateau which forms part of the catchment of the Severn, the county's major river; it enters Shropshire in the west and flows through Shrewsbury before turning south-east and exiting into Worcestershire south of Bridgnorth.

There is evidence of Neolithic and Bronze Age human occupation in Shropshire, including the Shropshire bulla pendant. The hillfort at Old Oswestry dates from the Iron Age, and the remains of the city of Viroconium Cornoviorum date from the Roman period. During the Anglo-Saxon era the area was part of Mercia. During the High Middle Ages the county was part of the Welsh Marches, the border region between Wales and England; from 1472 to 1689 Ludlow was the seat of the Council of Wales and the Marches, which administered justice in Wales and Herefordshire, Shropshire, Worcestershire and Gloucestershire. During the English Civil War Shropshire was Royalist, and Charles II fled through the county—famously hiding in an oak tree—after his final defeat at the Battle of Worcester. The area around Coalbrookdale is regarded as one of the birthplaces of the Industrial Revolution and has been designated a UNESCO World Heritage Site.

== History ==
=== Prehistory and antiquity ===
Evidence of Neolithic occupation of a religious form dating back before 2,000 BC, was discovered in 2017 in the grounds of a church, the medieval Church of the Holy Fathers in Sutton, Shrewsbury, making it Britain's oldest place of worship.

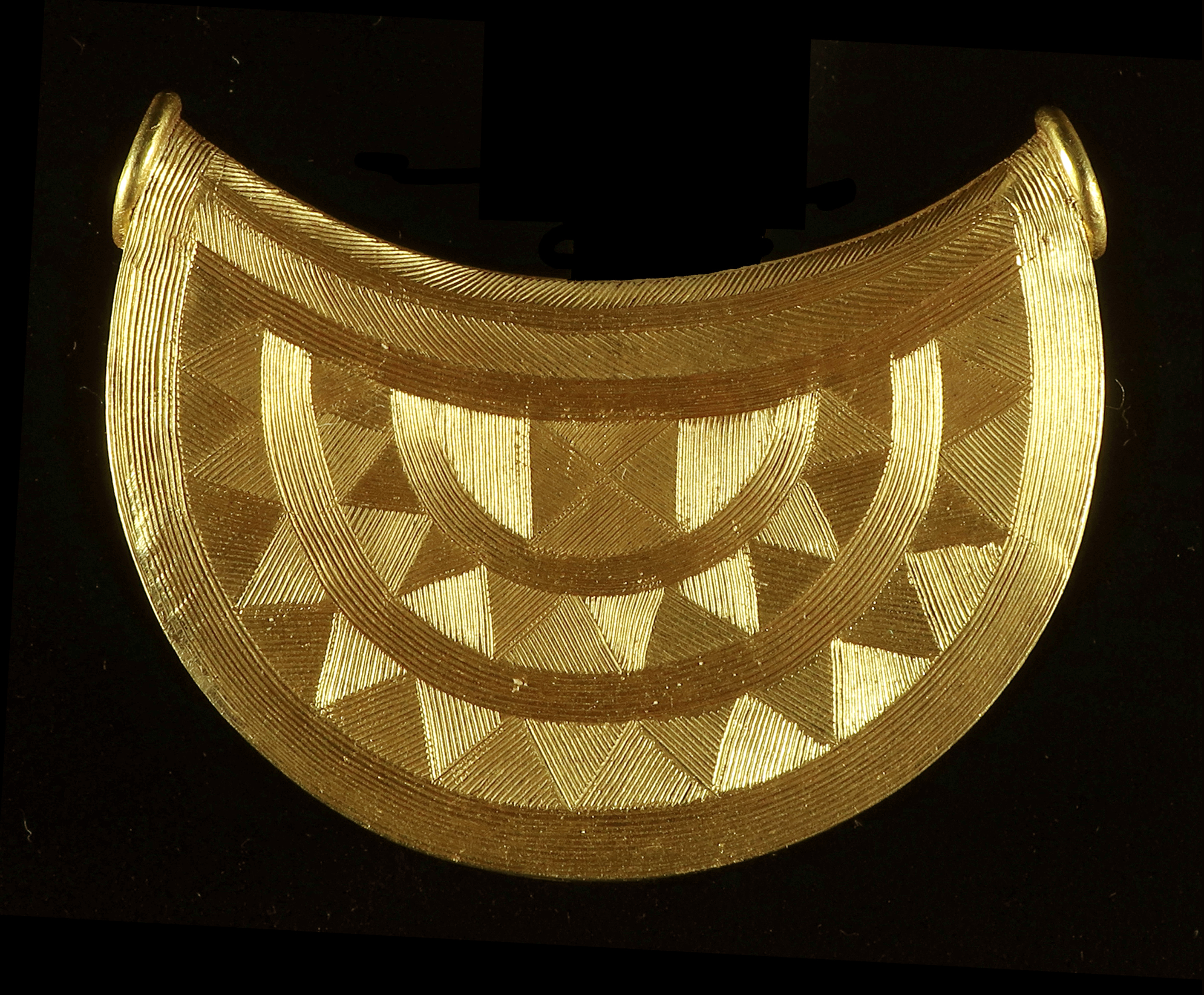
The Shropshire bulla or sun pendant

The Shropshire bulla ("bulla" is Medieval Latin for "a round seal", Classical Latin for "bubble, blob", plural bullae), also known as the Shropshire sun pendant, is a Late Bronze Age gold pendant found by a metal detectorist in 2018 in Shropshire. At Mitchell's Fold there is a Bronze Age stone circle set in dramatic moorland on Stapeley Hill.

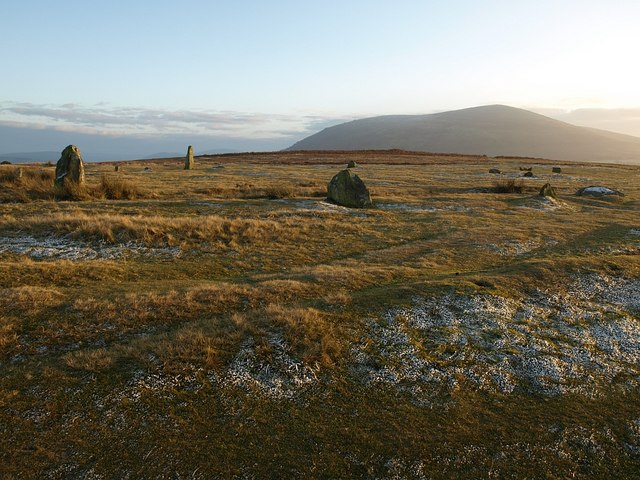
Mitchell's Fold prehistoric stone circle

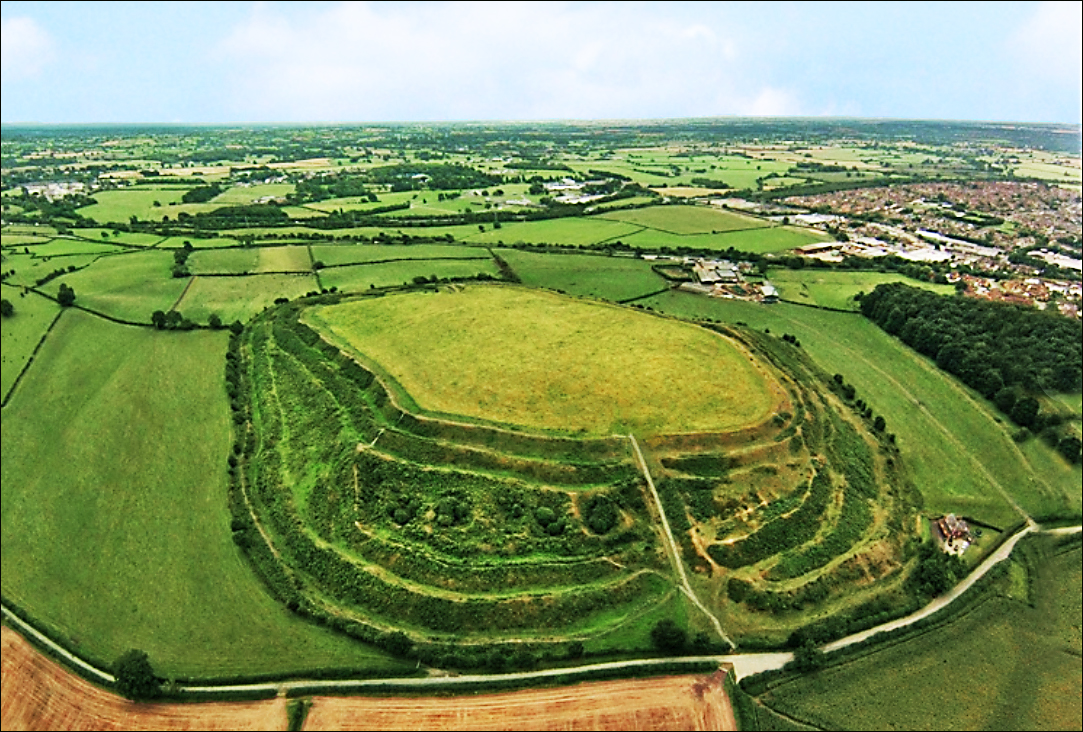
Old Oswestry Hillfort (aerial image)

The area was once part of the lands of the Cornovii, which consisted of the modern day counties of Cheshire, Shropshire, north Staffordshire, north Herefordshire, and eastern parts of Powys. This was a tribal Celtic Iron Age kingdom. Their capital in pre-Roman times was probably a hill fort on the Wrekin. There is an important Iron Age Hill fort at Old Oswestry earthworks, this has been linked to where King Arthur’s Guinevere was born and called "the Stonehenge of the Iron Age."

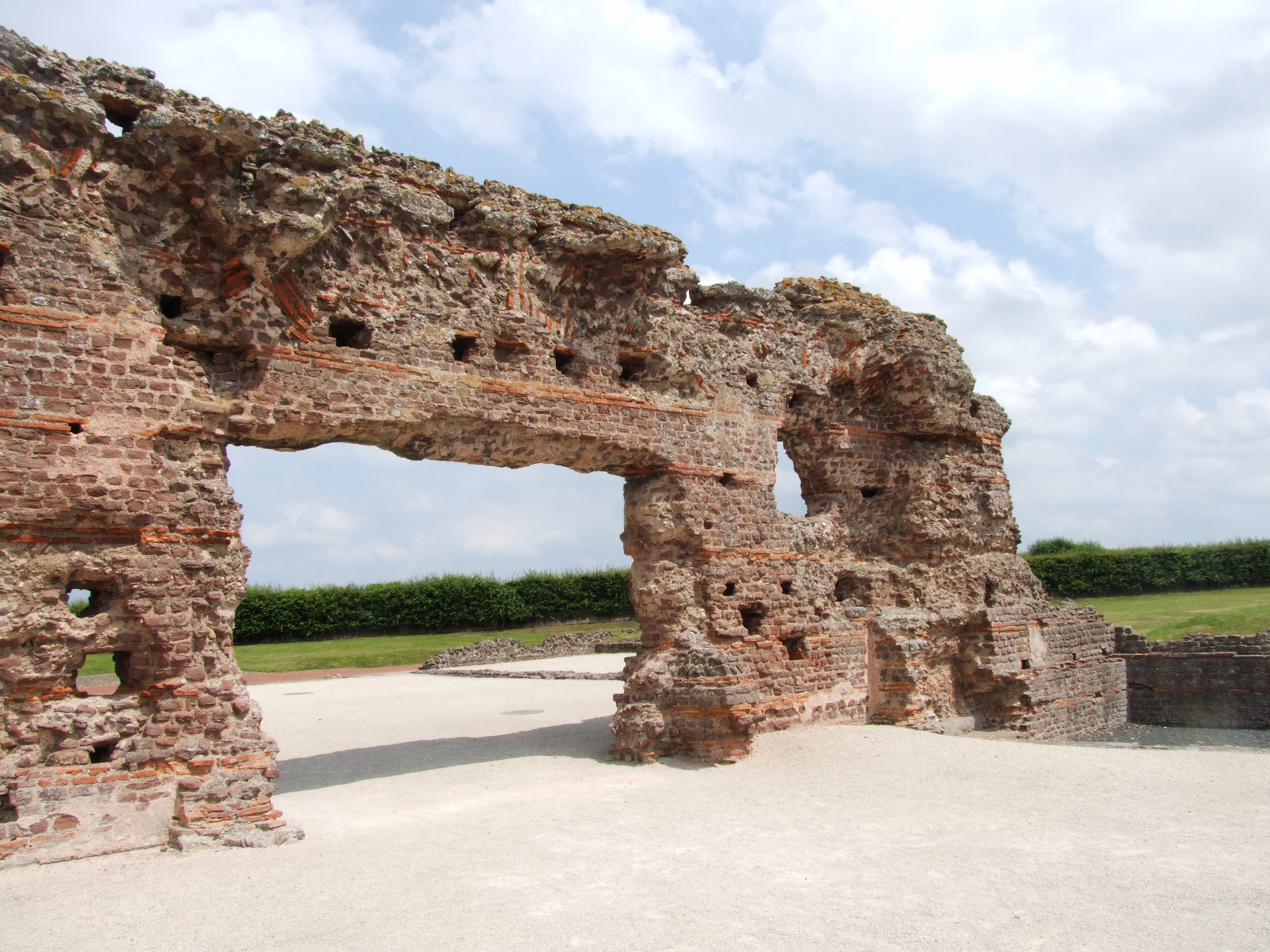
Ruins of Viroconium bath house (location now known as Wroxeter). This was once the 4th largest city in Roman Britain.

According to tradition, Caratacus (or Caractacus) made his last stand against the Romans in Shropshire. Ptolemy's 2nd century Geography names one of their towns as being Viroconium Cornoviorum (Wroxeter), which became their capital under Roman rule and one of the largest settlements in Britain.

=== Middle Ages ===
==== Early period ====
After the Roman occupation of Britain ended in the 5th century, the Shropshire area was in the eastern part of the Welsh Kingdom of Powys, known in Welsh poetry as the Paradise of Powys.

As 'Caer Guricon' it is a possible Shrewsbury was the site of the seat of the Kingdom of Powys in the Early Middle Ages. This would date establishment of the town to the 500s CE under Brochwel Ysgithrog. It is believed the area of Shrewsbury was settled in the 5th century by refugees from the nearby Roman City of Viroconium Cornoviorum, most physical evidence dates from the 7th century.

Oswestry saw conflict in the early mediaeval period and is traditionally suspected to be the site of the Battle of Maserfield, where Oswald of Northumbria was defeated and killed by the forces of King Penda in 641 or 642 CE. Oswald was later regarded as a saint, with Bede saying that the spot where he died came to be associated with miracles, and people took dirt from the site, which led to a hole being dug as deep as a man's height.

Around 680 CE Merewalh, a son of King Penda, founded a dual monastery for both monks and nuns at Much Wenlock. One of his daughters, Milburga, went on to be appointed as its second abbess, and later was canonised with the site of her bones becoming a popular pilgrimage destination, with the modern pilgrimage route of the Abbesses' Way running from Wenlock Priory to Shrewsbury.

King Offa of Mercia annexed the entirety of Shropshire over the course of the 8th century from Powys, with Shrewsbury captured in 778, with two dykes built to defend, or at least demarcate it from the Welsh. King Offa converted the palace of the rulers of Powys into his first church, dedicated to St Chad (a foundation that still survives in the town and operated on that initial site for over 1000 years, moving in 1792).

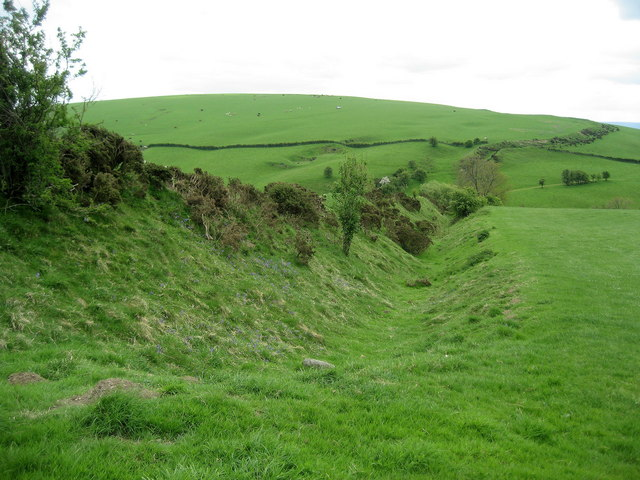
Section of Offa's Dyke near the Shropshire town of Clun, constructed after the Saxon annexation of the area in the 8th century AD

In later centuries, Vikings repeatedly invaded, with Wenlock Priory being destroyed in 874. To protect against this threat, fortresses were built at Bridgnorth (912) and Chirbury (913).

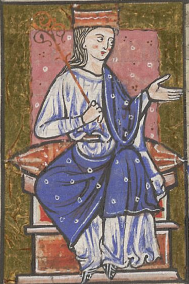
The relics of St Alkmund were brought to Shrewsbury in the 10th century, possibly by Æthelflæd, lady of the Mercians, daughter of Alfred the Great.

In 914, (Note: Tim Clarkson's biography has a detailed discussion of Æthelflæd' burhs.) Æthelflæd, Lady of the Mercians, fortified Shrewsbury, along with two other fortresses, at Scergeat (a currently unknown location) and Weardbyrig, (Note: thought to be Whitchurch, which would make sense given the strategic importance of the Roman Road link via the Via Devana.) Viking rides from the north travelling south were reaching Bridgnorth at this time (910CE). In the early tenth century, the relics of St Alkmund were translated to Whitchurch, this was also probably the work of Æthelflæd.

There is evidence to show that by the beginning of the 900s, Shrewsbury was home to a mint.

Archaeological excavations at the site of Shrewsbury castle in 2019 have indicated that the castle itself may have been a fortified site in the time of the Saxons.

==== High medieval period ====
After the Norman conquest in 1066, major estates in Shropshire were granted to Normans, including Roger de Montgomerie and later his son Robert de Bellême, who ordered significant constructions, particularly in Shrewsbury, the town of which he was Earl.

Many defensive castles were built at this time across the county to defend against the Welsh and enable effective control of the region, including Ludlow Castle and Shrewsbury Castle.

The western frontier with Wales was not finally determined until the 14th century. Also in this period, a number of religious foundations were formed, the county largely falling at this time under the Diocese of Hereford and that of Coventry and Lichfield. Some parishes in the north-west of the county in later times fell under the Diocese of St. Asaph until the disestablishment of the Church in Wales in 1920, when they were ceded to the Lichfield diocese.

The county was a central part of the Welsh Marches during the medieval period and was often embroiled in the power struggles between powerful Marcher Lords, the Earls of March and successive monarchs.

=== Modern history ===
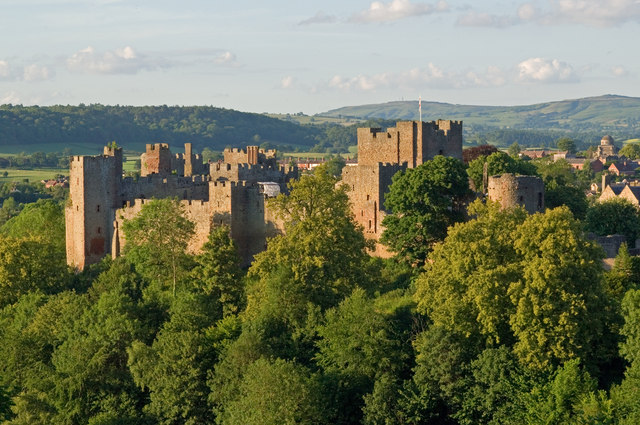
Ludlow Castle: one of the seats of the Council of the Marches, and a long-term focus of the court around successive Princes of Wales

From 1457, King Henry VI created for his son, Prince Edward, a Drink named to rule Wales and the Marches, Cheshire, and Cornwall, which became the Council of the Marches. Shropshire was governed via this council for several centuries.

According to historian John Davies, at its peak under Sir Henry Sidney and for a period thereafter the Council:

represented a remarkable experiment in regional government. It administered the law cheaply and rapidly; it dealt with up to twenty cases a day and George Owen stated that the 'oppressed poor' flocked to it.

==== Civil War ====
During the English Civil War, Shropshire was a Royalist stronghold, under the command of Sir Francis Ottley. In the autumn of 1642, Charles I had a temporary capital at Shrewsbury, though he immediately moved to Oxford after the events of the Battle of Wem. Prince Rupert established his headquarters in the town on 18 February 1644, being welcomed by Shrewsbury's aldermen.

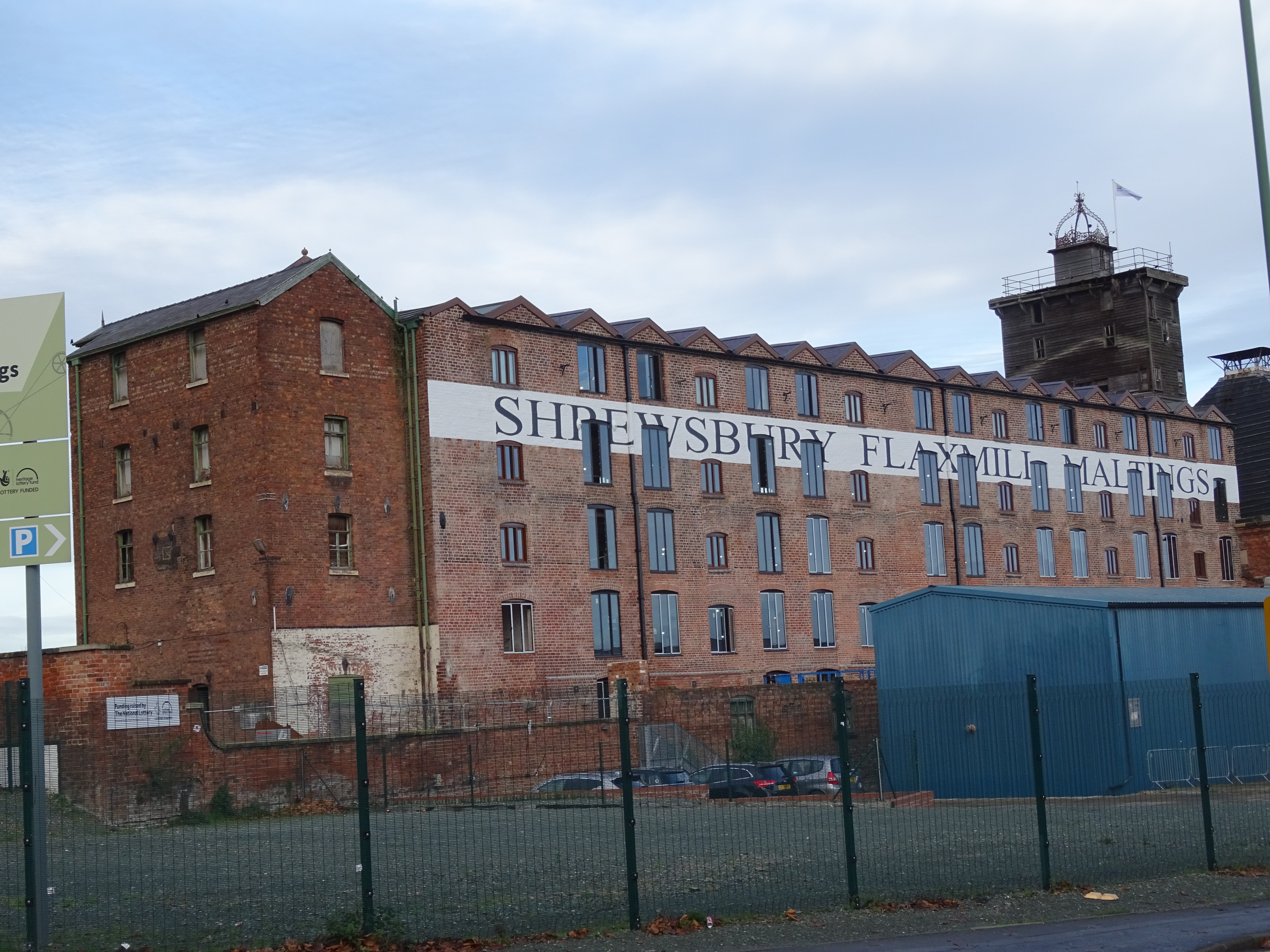
The Flaxmill-Maltings, under restoration

=== Victorian era ===
Much Wenlock was the birthplace of the modern Olympic movement.

== Culture and cultural references ==
=== Literature and legends ===
In the High Medieval period the Shropshire area influenced important poetry: the poet William Langland, writer of Piers Plowman, was born in Cleobury Mortimer, and the 14th-century alliterative poem St Erkenwald is written in a local dialect. The only copy of the ancient poem 'Life and Death' was also found in Shropshire.

In this period the county was also associated in divers places and ways with Arthurian legends, for instance at Hawkstone, where there is a legend that one of the caves of Hawkstone Park was the burial ground of King Arthur, and the Arthurian story of the giants Tarquin and Tarquinus is located, or Whittington Castle and linked to the Holy Grail since the 13th century. Old Oswestry has been identified as a possible home of Guinevere. Ludlow Castle site features heavily in the folk-story of Fulk FitzWarin, outlawed Lord of Whittington, Shropshire and a possible inspiration for the Robin Hood legend.

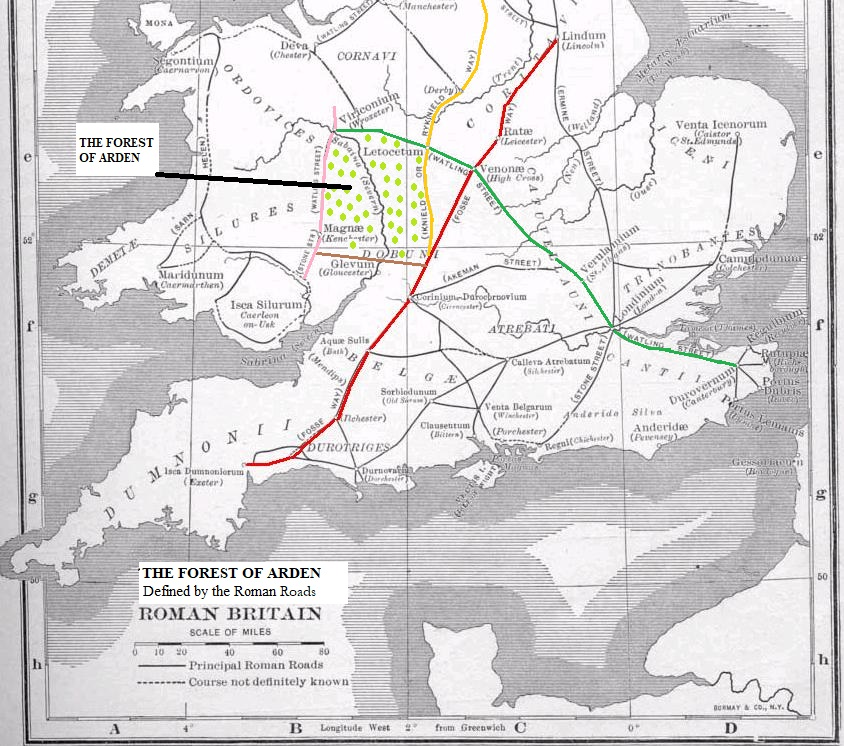
Parts of Shropshire in the ancient Forest of Arden

Parts of Shropshire are inside the ancient Forest of Arden, which was the part of the English Midlands, that in antiquity and into the Early Modern Period was bounded by the Roman roads including to the North by the Watling Street and to the west by Wales. This forest was the Setting of Shakespeare's As You Like It, and that play is acknowledged to potentially be a cultural monument to Sir Rowland Hill, a prominent Tudor statesman and publisher of the Geneva Bible from the county.

Shropshire was the original seat of prominence of the Cotton family who held the Cotton Library before it was taken to found the British Library.

Shrewsbury Abbey features in The Cadfael Chronicles; Brother Cadfael is a member of the community at the Abbey.

The poet A. E. Housman used Shropshire as the setting for many of the poems in his first book, A Shropshire Lad. Moreover, many of Malcolm Saville's children's books are set in Shropshire. Additionally, D. H. Lawrence's novella, St. Mawr, is partially set in the Stiperstones area of South Shropshire.. The Clark Tracey Quintet, commissioned by John C. Williams’ Leasowes Bank Music Festival in Ratlinghope, recorded in 1987 the jazz album Stiperstones, inspired by the south Shropshire landscape.

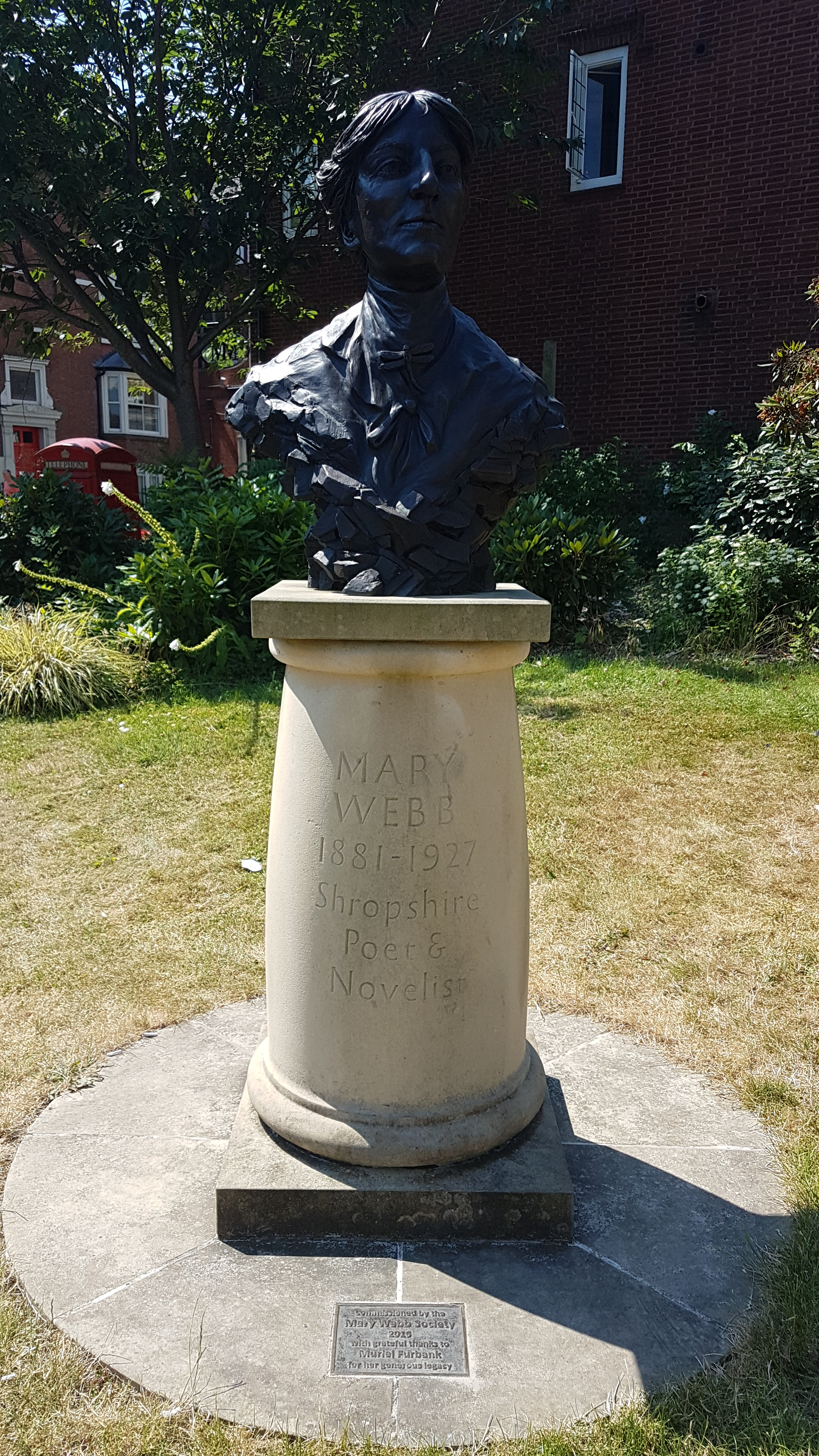
Mary Webb is remembered with a bust in Shrewsbury.

The early 20th century novelist and poet Mary Webb was born in Shropshire and lived most of her life there, and all her novels are set there, most notably Precious Bane, with its powerful evocation of the Shropshire countryside. A school in Pontesbury bears her name.

Shropshire is widely believed to have been an influence for J. R. R. Tolkien's landscape of the Shire in The Lord of the Rings. Specifically, the Wrekin (as The Lonely Mountain) and Ellesmere (as Laketown) are said to have inspired the English fantasy writer.

In Susanna Clarke's Jonathan Strange & Mr Norrell (2004), Jonathan Strange is from the county, and some parts of the book are set there. Another fictional character from Shropshire is Mr Grindley, from Charles Dickens' Bleak House.

P. G. Wodehouse's fictional Blandings Castle, the ancestral home of Lord Emsworth, is located in Shropshire. Also from Shropshire is Psmith, a fictional character in a series of Wodehouse's novels.

In Oscar Wilde's The Importance of Being Earnest, Algernon attempts to trick Jack into revealing the location of his country home by inferring he resides in Shropshire.

The 1856 plantation literature novel White Acre vs. Black Acre by William M. Burwell features two Shropshire farms acting as an allegory for American slavery – "White Acre Farm" being the abolitionist Northern United States, and "Black Acre Farm" being the slaveholding Southern United States.

The angel Aziraphale, a principal character in Good Omens, was credited with designing Shropshire by Terry Pratchett.

In the novel Howards End, Mr. Wilcox's daughter gets married in Shropshire. Part of the novel is set near Clun.

=== Theology ===
Shropshire was the native county and rural seat of power of Sir Rowland Hill, who coordinated and published the 1560 Geneva Bible. This important Bible was the senior Bible of English Protestantism for the early decades of the Elizabethan Religious Settlement.

=== Drama ===
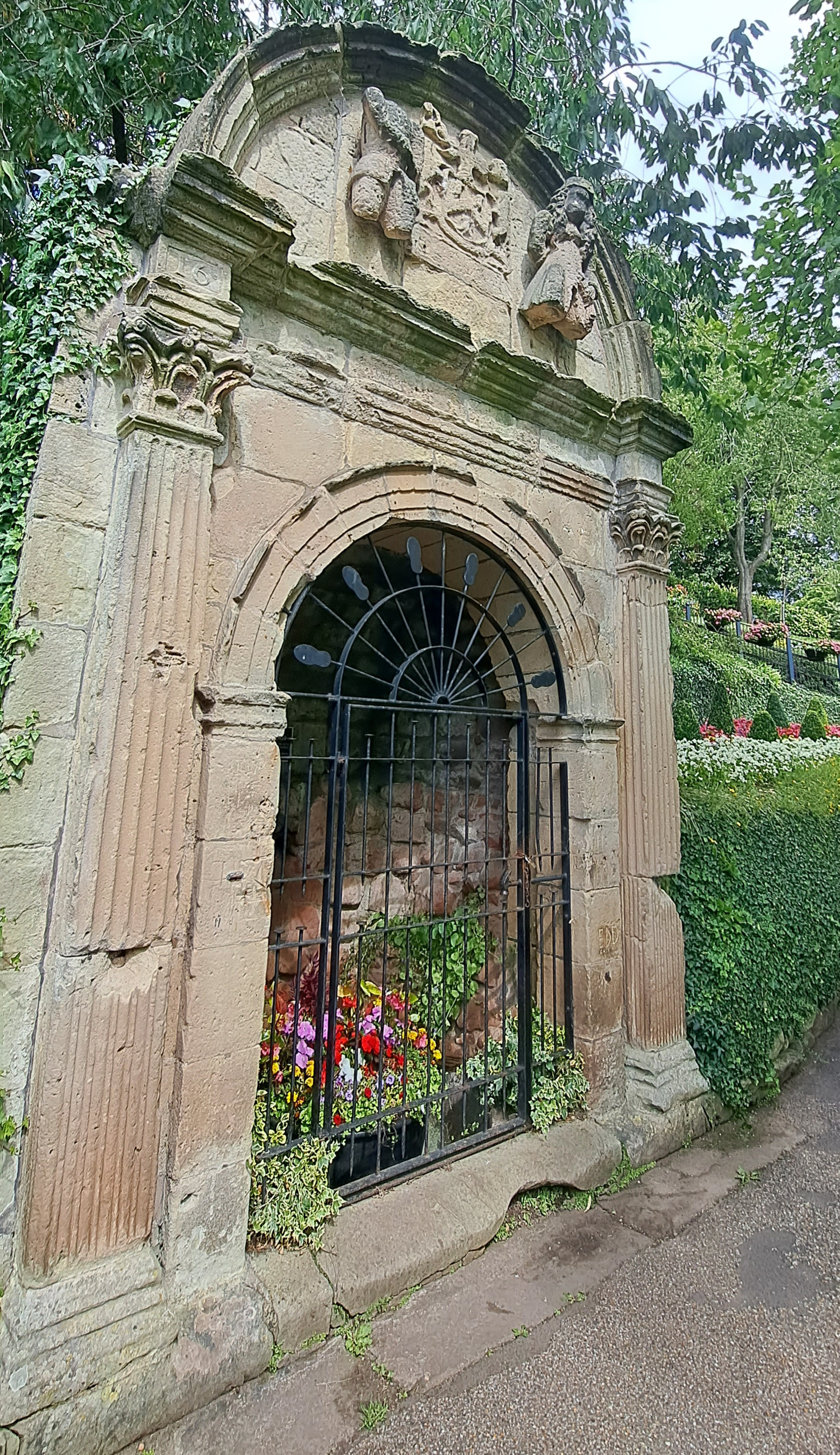
A surviving 1679 arbour in Shrewsbury (that of the Shoemakers Guild). Originally there were many of these for pageantry and performance in Kingsland.

Prior to the Reformation, there are accounts of major festivals in the county. The "first flowerings of English drama" in the Tudor period are considered to be in the town, according to the 18th century Poet laureate and scholar Thomas Warton. Whitsuntide and mystery plays were performed in the founding years of Shrewsbury School under Thomas Ashton; they attracted the attention of Queen Elizabeth I. Later this was expressed in the many arbours built in Shrewsbury for that town's particular tradition of pageantry and performance.

==== Shakespeare ====
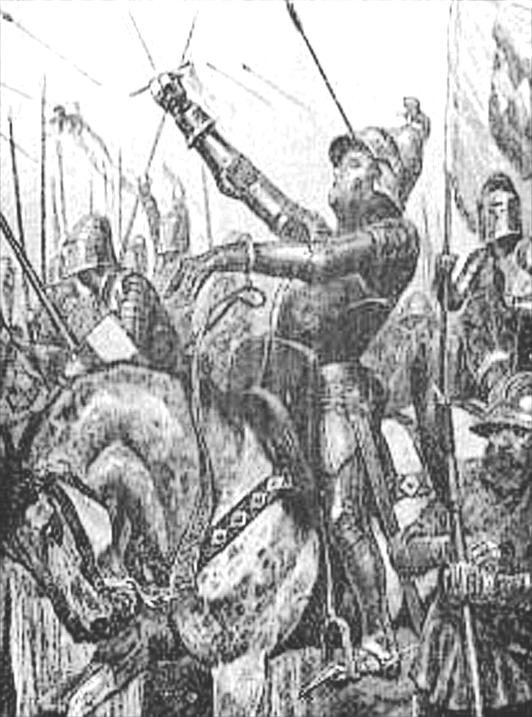
The last two acts of Henry IV, Part I are set in the county.

Shakespeare memorialised the Battle of Shrewsbury in Henry IV, Part 1, in Acts IV (Scenes and 3) and V (Scenes 1–5). The arrest of Buckingham referred to in Richard III (Act IV, scene iv) happened near Wem. Ludlow castle is also referred to in the same play (Act II, scene ii). There is a tradition that inscriptions on the Stanley monuments in St Bartholomew's Church, Tong are the work of Shakespeare.

==== Other playwrights ====
William Wycherley was born at Clive near Shrewsbury, although his birthplace has been said to be Trench Farm to the north near Wem later the birthplace of another writer, John Ireland, who was said to have been adopted by Wycherley's widow following the death of Ireland's parents.

The playwright George Farquhar's 1706 play The Recruiting Officer is set in Shrewsbury.

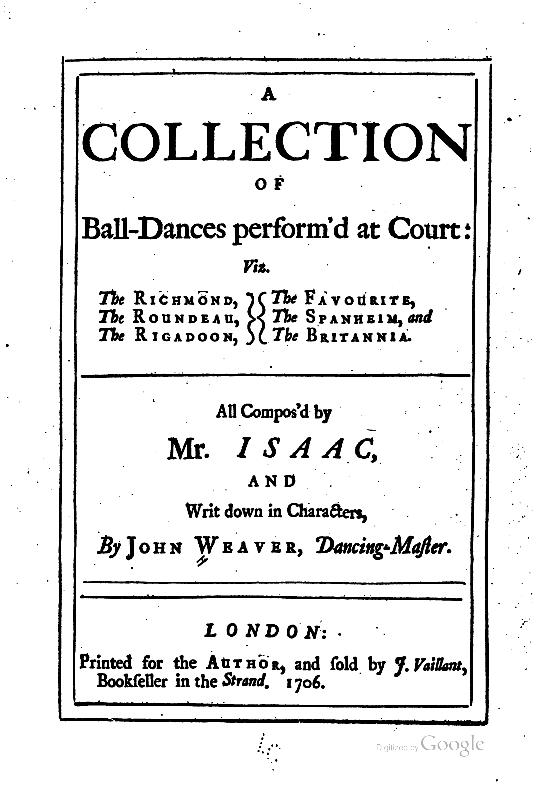
A Collection of Ball-dances Perform'd at Court; all compos'd by Mr. Isaac, and writ down in characters, by John Weaver, dancing-master (1706)

=== Birthplace of English ballet and pantomime ===
The "father of English ballet", as well as the originator of pantomime, John Weaver, developed his art in Shrewsbury. A second generation dancing master in the town, he founded English ballet, founded pantomime, and wrote on the philosophy, theology, statecraft and biology embedded in his era's understating of dance. Later in life he came to publish on the subject of dance, which he located in a wider understanding of his culture as representing a component of Ptolemaic harmony and an earnest part of the statecraft of his time.

=== Architecture ===
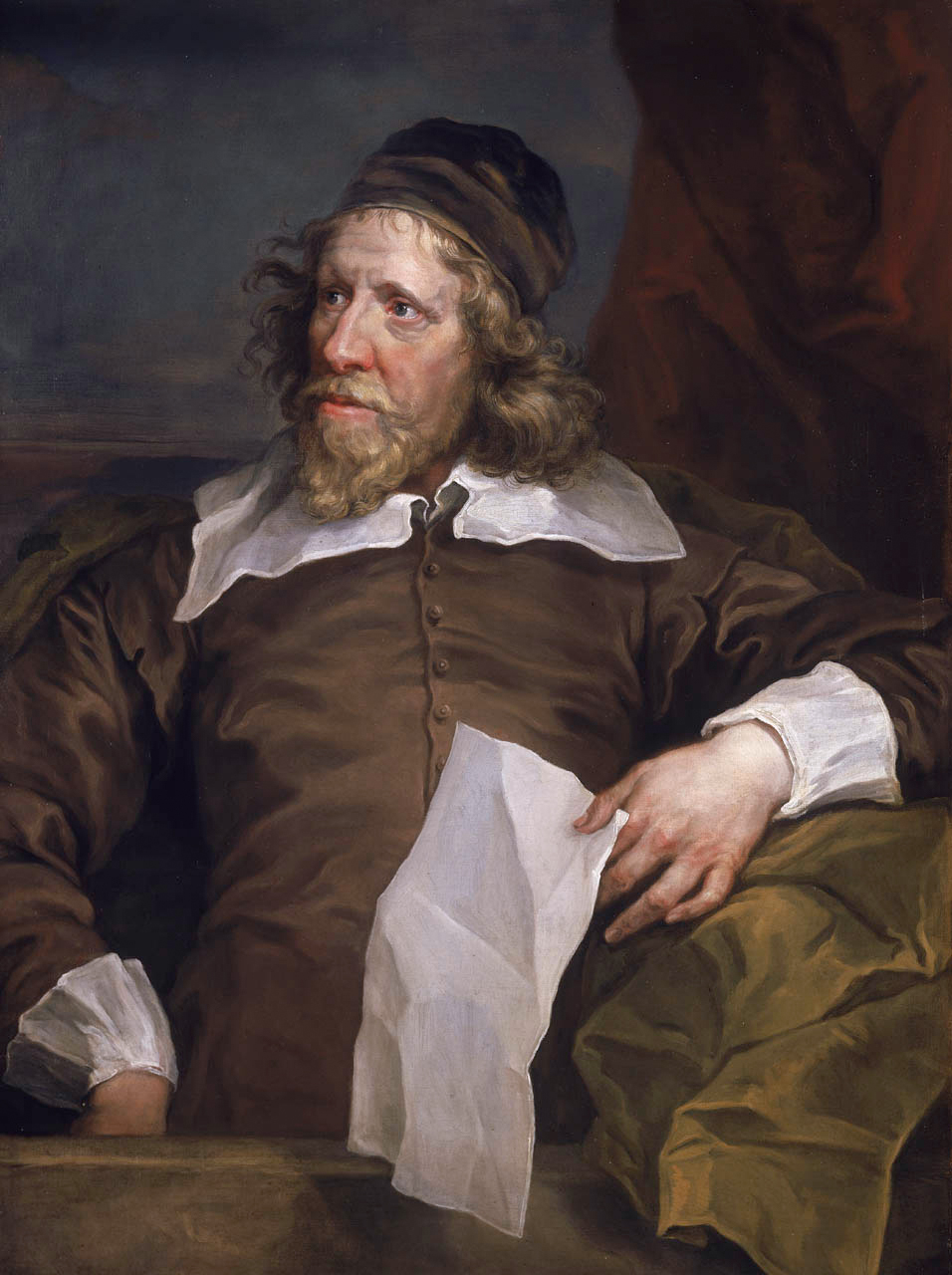
Inigo Jones was active in the county at the beginning of his career as an architect.

The first known architectural project of Inigo Jones is the Cotton monument in the Church of St Chad, Norton-in-Hales.

There are a number of important buildings in the county. The world's first iron-framed building was built in Shrewsbury at the Flaxmill Maltings: the techniques pioneered in that building were necessary preconditions for skyscrapers.

Nash and Repton were active at Attingham Park.

A rare Anglo-Saxon hall, which was a high status building from the Anglo Saxon period, and possibly a feasting hall or palace, was excavated at nearby Attingham in 2018; the dating window is between 400 AD and 1066.

=== Film and television ===
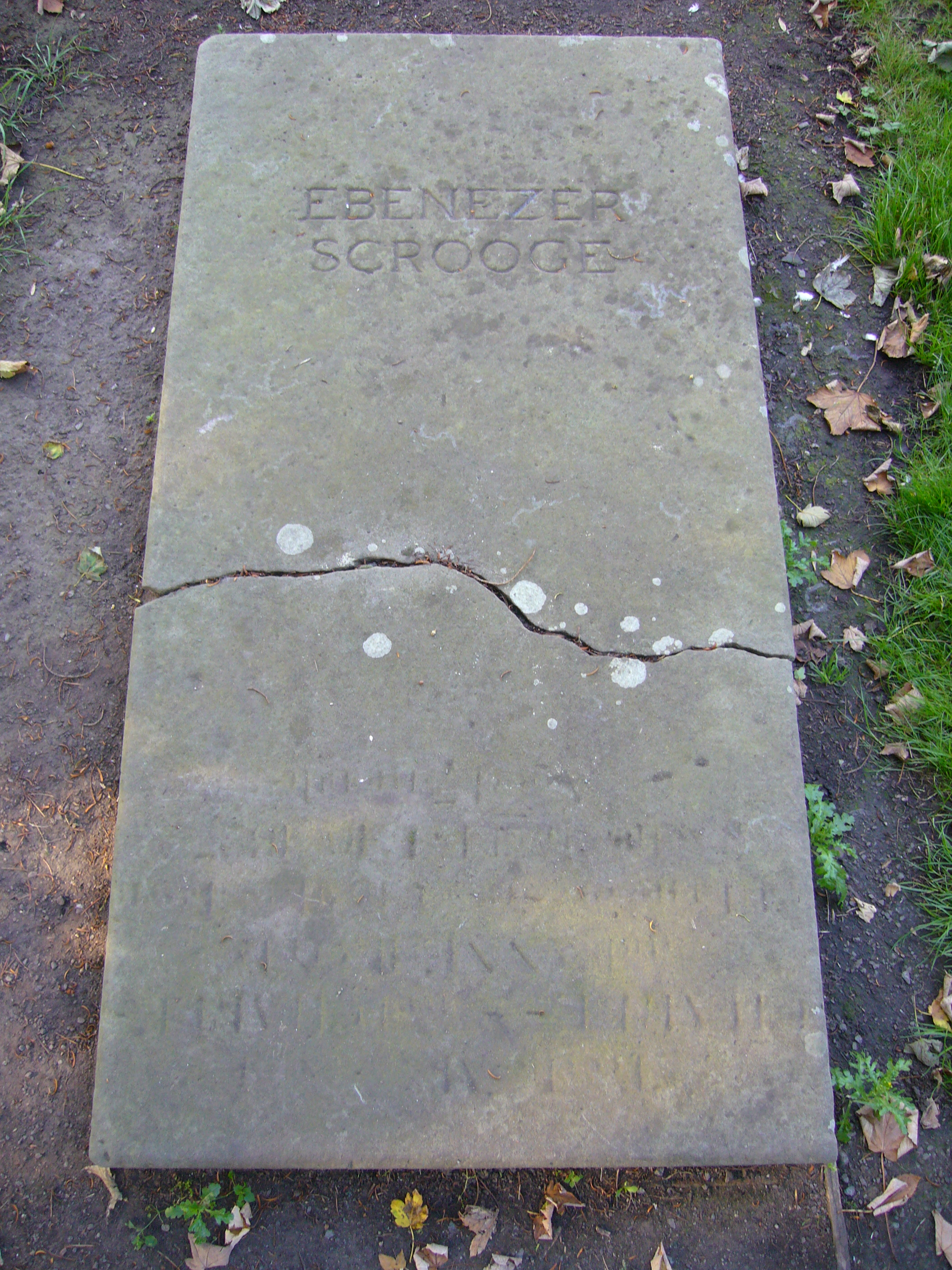
A 1984 film adaptation of A Christmas Carol was filmed in Shrewsbury. Scrooge's fictional grave remains in the churchyard of St. Chad's Church.

The landscape around Hawkstone Park was used to represent parts of Narnia in the BBC's TV adaptation of C. S. Lewis's books in The Lion, the Witch and the Wardrobe in 1988 and Prince Caspian a year later.

The 1984 film version of Charles Dickens' A Christmas Carol was filmed in Shrewsbury. The 2005 sitcom The Green Green Grass is set in Shropshire and was filmed near Ludlow.

The 2007 film Atonement was partly filmed in the county.

The 2023 BBC adaptation of Bleak House was filmed partly in Shropshire.

== Emblems ==
=== Coat of arms ===
The blazon for the coat of arms of the county of Shropshire is:

erminois, three pile azure, two issuant from the chief and one in base, each charged with a leopard's face

The arms were officially granted on 18 June 1896 and continued by the new authority in 2009.

The heads are often referred to as "the loggerheads". This is thought to originate from the practice of carving a leopard head as a motif on the head of the log used as a battering ram.

=== Flag ===
The Shropshire county flag, based on the coat of arms granted in 1896

The Shropshire county flag is a banner of arms taken from its coat of arms. It was registered with the Flag Institute in March 2012. It shows three leopard heads ('loggerheads') on a gold and blue background.

=== County flower ===
In a national poll in 2002, conducted by Plantlife International, the round-leaved sundew (Drosera rotundifolia) was chosen as Shropshire's county flower. The round-leaved sundew is a crimson-coloured insectivorous plant that requires a boggy habitat. Due to habitat loss its range is now dramatically reduced, and Shropshire's Longmynd is one of the few areas in England where it can now be found.

=== Shropshire Day ===
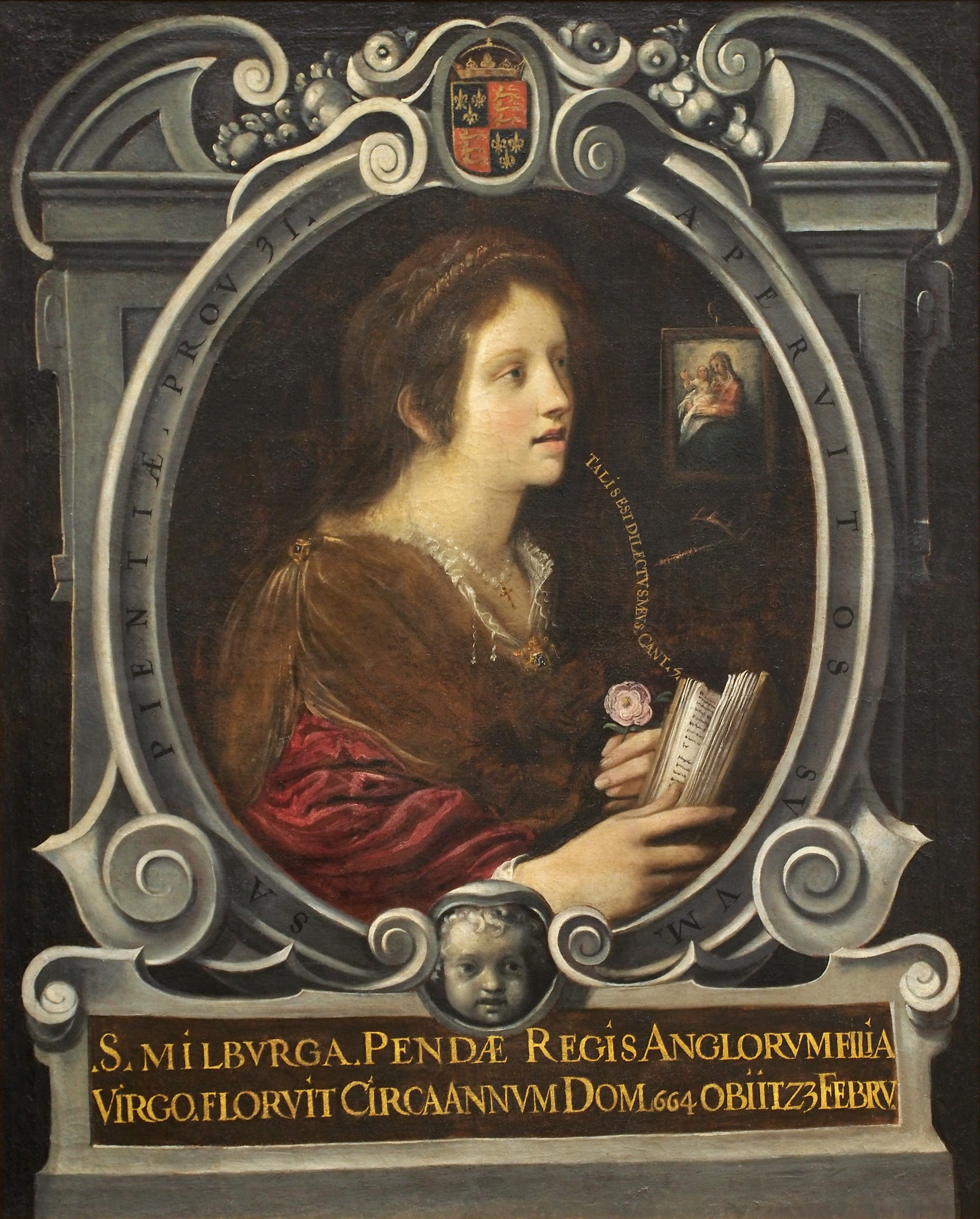
Santa Milburga's day is the county's day.

Shropshire's county day is on 23 February, the feast day of St Milburga, abbess of Wenlock Priory. St Milburga was the daughter of Anglo-Saxon king Merewalh, who founded the abbey within his sub-kingdom of Magonsæte. The town adjoining the priory is now known as Much Wenlock, and lies within the boundaries of the modern county of Shropshire.

=== Motto ===
Shropshire's motto is Floreat Salopia, meaning "May Shropshire flourish".

British Rail loco No.31147 was named 'Floreat Salopia'.

== Etymology ==
Shropshire is first recorded in the Anglo-Saxon Chronicle annal for 1006.

The origin of the name is the Old English Scrobbesbyrigscīr, meaning "Shrewsburyshire", "the shire of the fortified place in the scrublands" (or "shrubs", the modern derivative). Salop is an old name for Shropshire, historically used as an abbreviated form for post or telegrams; it is thought to derive from the Anglo-French "Salopesberia".

It is nowadays normally replaced by Shrops, although Shropshire residents are still referred to as Salopians.

Salop is also an alternative name for the county town, Shrewsbury, which shares the motto Floreat Salopia.

== Geography ==
When a county council for the county was first established in 1889, it was called Salop County Council. Following the Local Government Act 1972, Salop became the official name of the county. The name was not well-regarded locally, and a subsequent campaign led by a local councillor, John Kenyon, succeeded in having both the county and council renamed as Shropshire in 1980. This took effect from 1 April of that year.

=== County extent ===
The border with Wales was defined in the 16th century – the hundreds of Oswestry (including Oswestry town) and Pimhill (including Wem) and part of Chirbury had prior to the Laws in Wales Act formed various Lordships in the Welsh Marches.

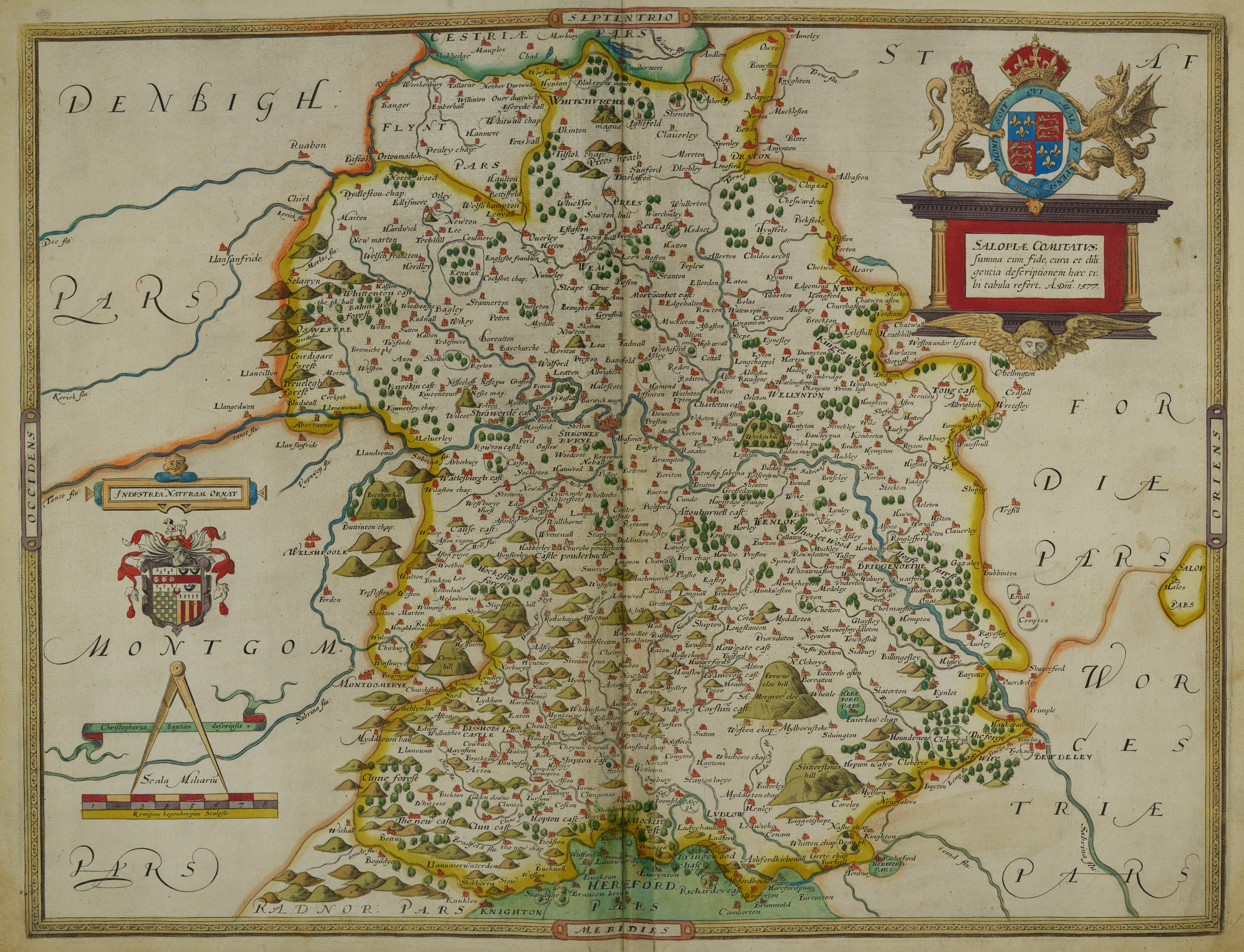
Hand-drawn map of Shropshire by Christopher Saxton from 1577

The present day ceremonial county boundary is almost the same as the historic one. Notably there has been the removal of several exclaves and enclaves. The largest of the exclaves was Halesowen, which became part of Worcestershire in 1844 (and is now part of the West Midlands county), and the largest of the enclaves was Herefordshire's Farlow in South Shropshire, also transferred in 1844, to Shropshire. Alterations have been made on Shropshire's border with all neighbouring English counties over the centuries. Gains have been made to the south of Ludlow (from Herefordshire), to the north of Shifnal (from Staffordshire) and to the north (from Cheshire) and south (from Staffordshire) of Market Drayton. The county has lost land in two places – to Staffordshire and Worcestershire.

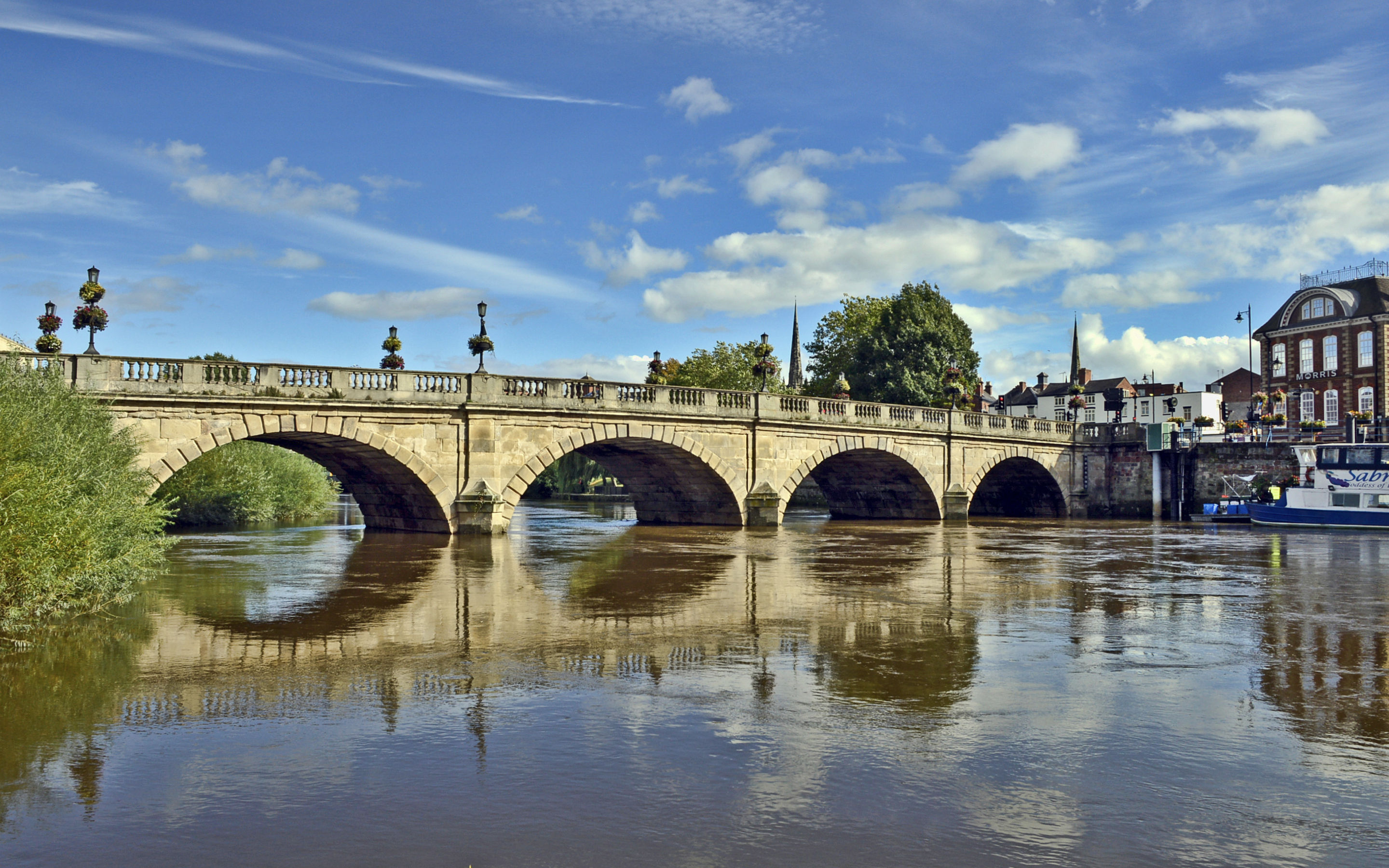
River Severn, seen here in Shrewsbury, is the primary watercourse in the county.

Geographically, Shropshire is divisible into two distinct halves – north and south. The county has a highly diverse geology. The West Midlands Green Belt extends into eastern Shropshire, covering an area north from Highley, to the east of Bridgnorth, north to the eastern side of Telford, leaving Shropshire eastwards alongside the A5. This encompasses Shifnal, Cosford and Albrighton, and various other villages paralleling Dudley and Wolverhampton.

=== North Shropshire ===
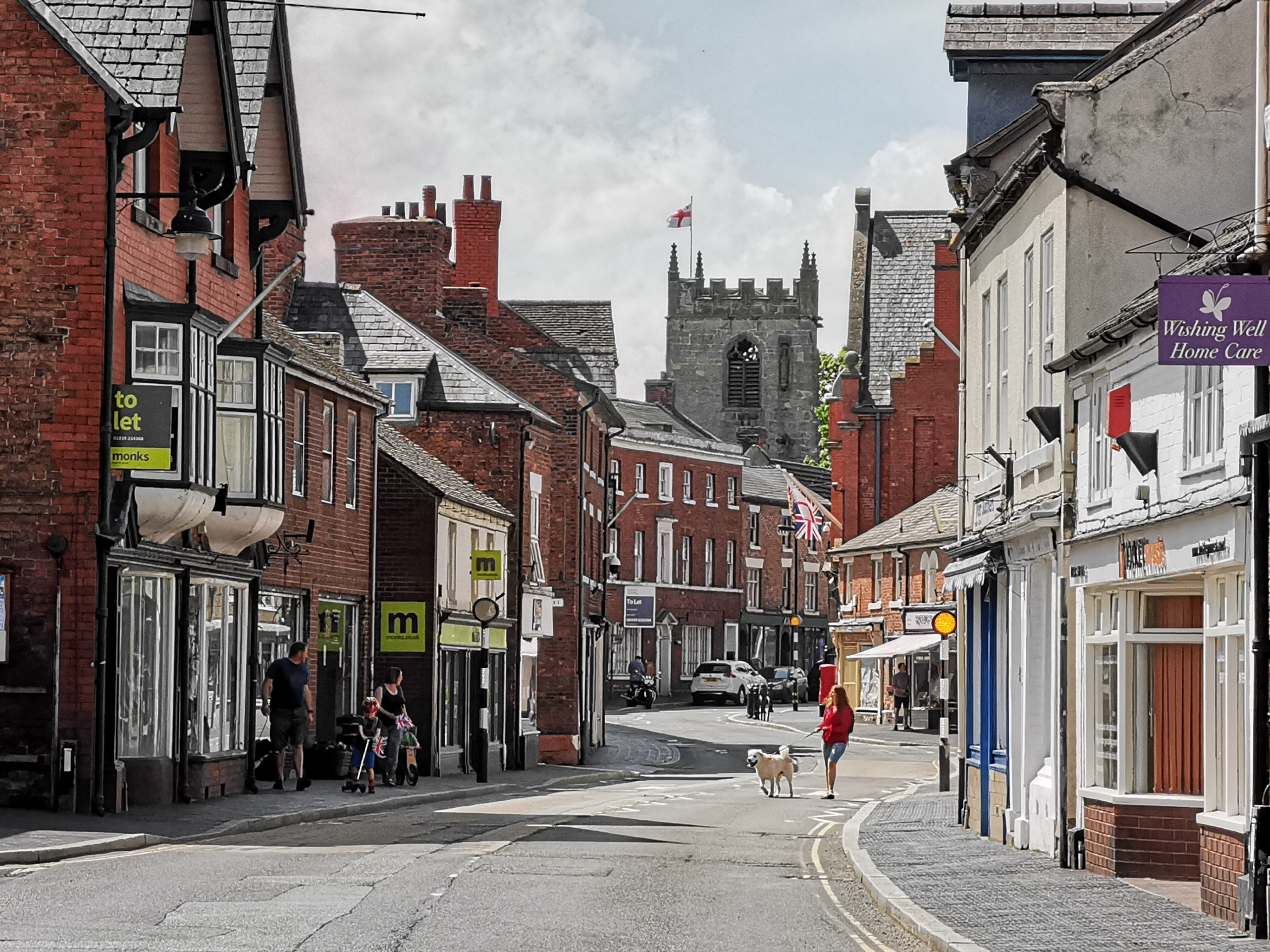
Wem, traditionally the headquarters of government in North Shropshire, and home to the North Shropshire District Council while in existence

The North Shropshire Plain is an extension of the flat and fertile Cheshire Plain. It is here that most of the county's large towns, and population, are to be found. Shrewsbury at the centre, Oswestry to the north west, Whitchurch to the north, Market Drayton to the north east, and Newport and the Telford conurbation (Telford, Wellington, Oakengates, Donnington and Shifnal) to the east. The land is fertile and agriculture remains a major feature of the landscape and the economy. The River Severn runs through the lower half of this area (from Wales in the west, eastwards), through Shrewsbury and down the Ironbridge Gorge, before heading south to Bridgnorth.

The area around Oswestry has more rugged geography than the North Shropshire Plain and the western half is over an extension of the Wrexham Coalfield and there are also copper deposits on the border with Wales. Mining of stone and sand aggregates is still going on in Mid-Shropshire, notably on Haughmond Hill, near Bayston Hill, and around the village of Condover. Lead mining also took place at Snailbeach and the Stiperstones, but this has now ceased. Other primary industries, such as forestry and fishing, are to be found too.

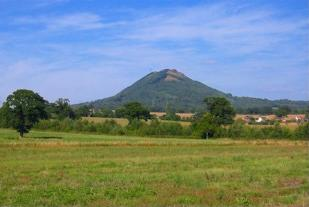
The Wrekin is a prominent geographical feature located near Wellington in the east of the county.

The A5 and M54 run from Wolverhampton (to the east of the county) across to Telford, around Shrewsbury parallel to the line of Watling Street, an ancient trackway. The A5 then turns north west to Oswestry, before heading north into Wales in the Wrexham area. This is an important artery and the corridor is where most of Shropshire's modern commerce and industry is found, notably in Telford new town. There are also a number of railway lines crossing over the area, which centre at Shrewsbury. To the south west of Telford, near the Ironbridge Gorge, was Ironbridge Power Station.

The new town of Telford is built partly on a former industrial area centred on the East Shropshire Coalfield as well as on former agricultural land. There are still many ex-colliery sites to be found in the area, as well as disused mine shafts. This industrial heritage is an important tourist attraction, as is seen by the growth of museums in the Ironbridge, Coalbrookdale, Broseley and Jackfield area. Blists Hill museum and historical (Victorian era) village is a major tourist attraction as well as the Iron Bridge itself. In addition, Telford Steam Railway runs from Horsehay.

=== South Shropshire ===
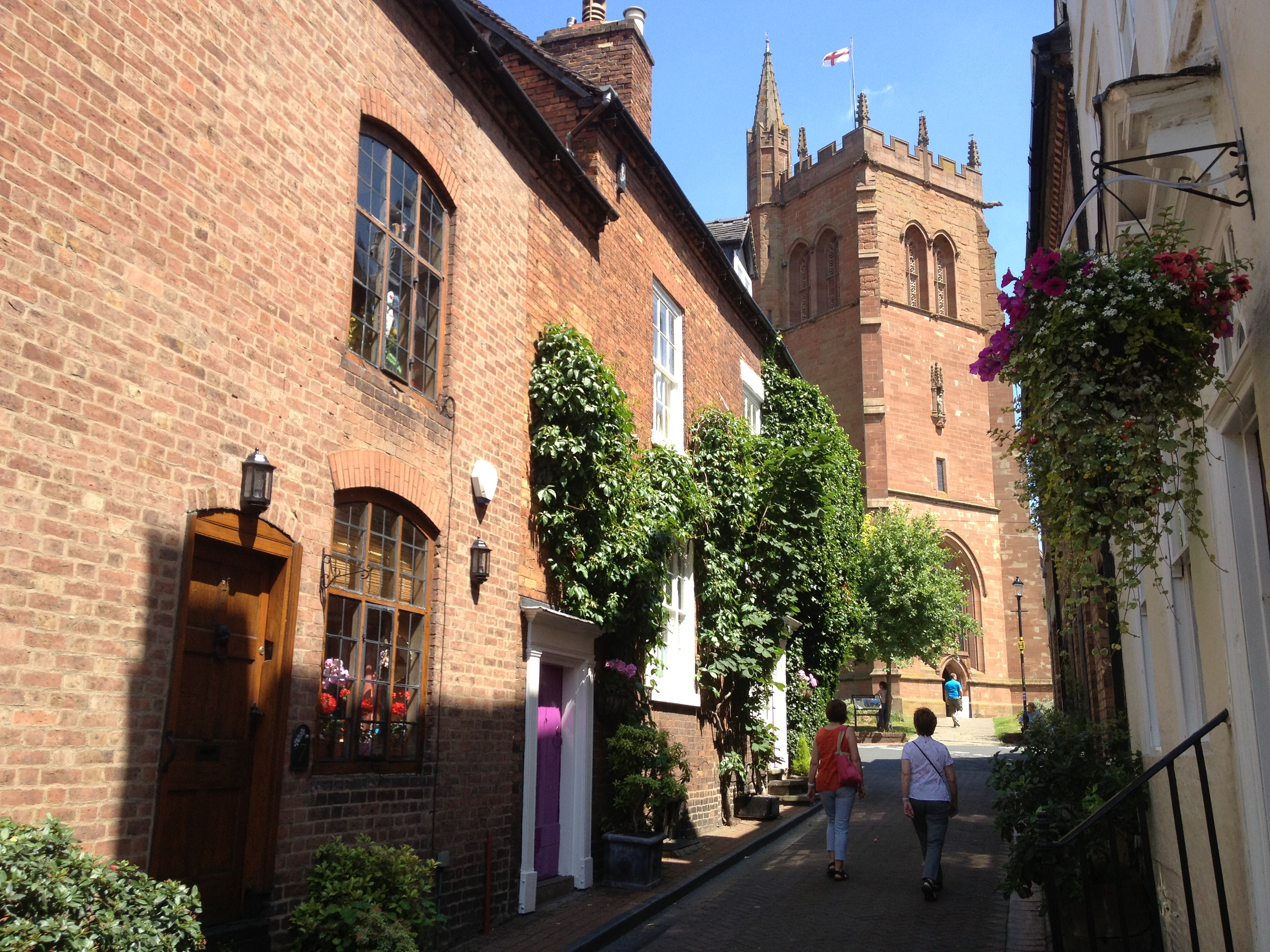
St Leonard's Church is a prominent historical landmark in Bridgnorth.

South Shropshire is more rural, with fewer settlements and no large towns, and its landscape differs greatly from that of North Shropshire. The area is dominated by significant hill ranges and river valleys, woods, pine forests and "batches", a colloquial term for small valleys. Farming is more pastoral than the arable found in the north of the county. The only substantial towns are Bridgnorth, with a population of around 12,000 people, Ludlow and Church Stretton. The Shropshire Hills AONB is located in the south-west, covering an area of 810 km^{2} (312 sq mi); it forms the only specifically protected area of the county. Inside this area is the popular Long Mynd, a large plateau of 516 m (1,693 ft) overlooking Church Stretton and to its west, the 536 metres (1,759 ft) rocky ridge of Stiperstones.

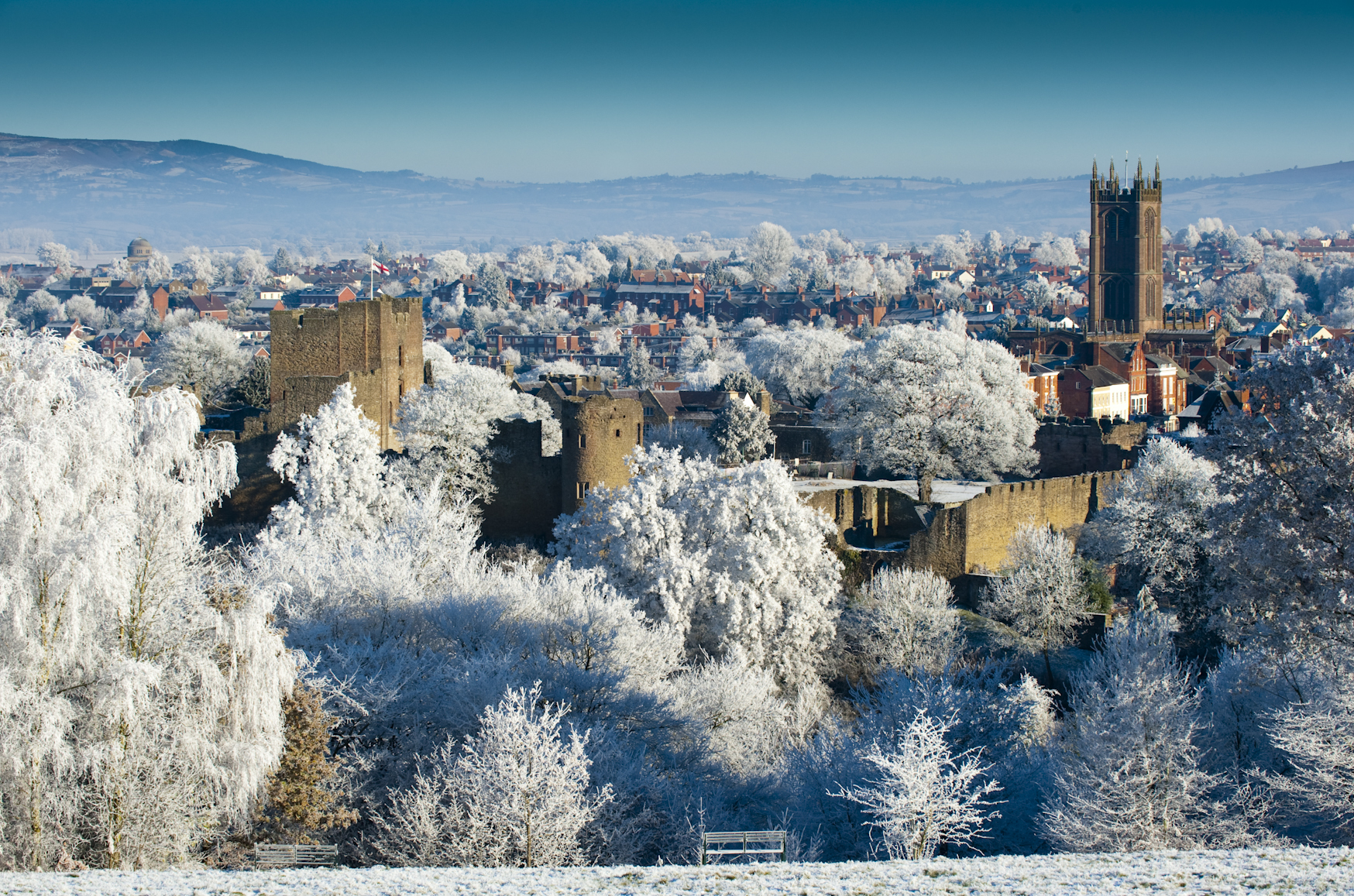
The skyline of Ludlow, one of south Shropshire's market towns, dominated by its sizeable castle and church

The A49 is the main road through the area, running north to south, from Shrewsbury to Herefordshire. A railway line runs through the area on the same route as the A49 with stations at Church Stretton, Craven Arms and Ludlow. The steam heritage Severn Valley Railway runs from Bridgnorth into Worcestershire along the Severn Valley, terminating at Kidderminster.

Because of its valley location and character, Church Stretton is sometimes called Little Switzerland, and is depicted in Little Switzerland. Nearby are the old mining and quarrying communities on the Clee Hills, notable geological features in the Onny Valley and Wenlock Edge and fertile farmland in Corve Dale. The River Teme drains this part of the county, before flowing into Worcestershire to the south and joining the River Severn.

One of the Clee Hills, the Brown Clee Hill, is the county's highest peak at 540 m (1,770 ft). It is the 13th highest county top in England.

South West Shropshire is a markedly rural part of the county, with Clun Forest, Offa's Dyke, the River Clun and the River Onny. The small towns of Clun and Bishop's Castle are in this area. To the south of Clun is the Welsh border town of Knighton.

=== Natural regions ===
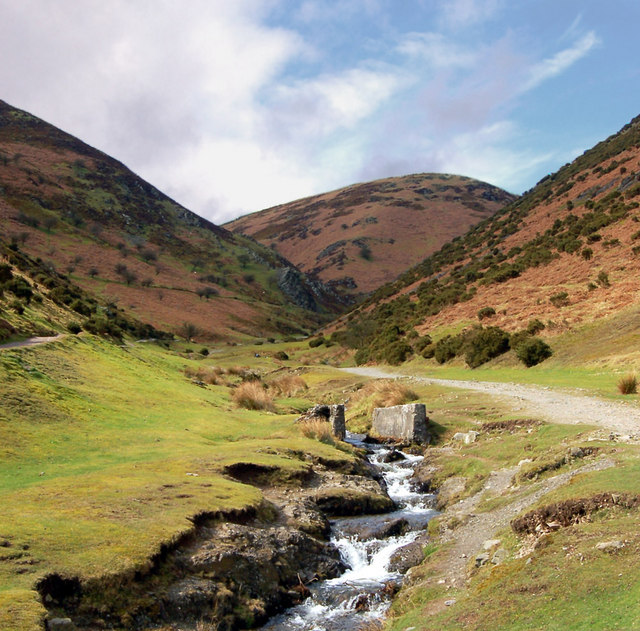
The landscape of the Long Mynd, to the west of Church Stretton

Natural England recognised the following national character areas that lie wholly or partially within Shropshire:

- Shropshire Hills
- Shropshire and Staffordshire Plain
- Oswestry Uplands
- Mid Severn Sandstone Plateau
- Teme Valley
- Herefordshire Lowlands
- Clun and North West Herefordshire Hills
- Whixall Moss

=== Climate ===
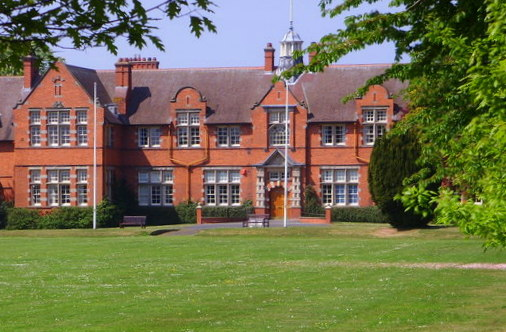
Harper Adams University, where on 10 January 1982 the lowest temperature ever in England was recorded

The climate of Shropshire is moderate. Rainfall averages 760 to 1,000 mm (30 to 40 in), influenced by being in the rainshadow of the Cambrian Mountains from warm, moist frontal systems of the Atlantic Ocean which bring generally light precipitation in Autumn and Spring. The hilly areas in the south and west are much colder in the winter, due to their high elevation, they share a similar climate to that of the Welsh Marches and Mid-Wales. The flat northern plain in the north and east has a similar climate to that of the rest of the West Midlands.

Being rural and inland, temperatures can fall more dramatically on clear winter nights than in many other parts of England. It was at Harper Adams University, in Edgmond, where on 10 January 1982 the lowest temperature weather record for England was broken (and is kept to this day): −26.1 °C (−15.0 °F).

The only major Met Office weather station in the county is located at Shawbury, which is in the north, between Shrewsbury and Market Drayton.

Climate data for Shawbury (Note: RAF Shawbury is located approximately 7 miles (11 km) NE of Shrewsbury, and 12 miles (19 km) NW of Telford.) WMO ID: 03414; coordinates 52°47′41″N 2°39′53″W; elevation: 72 m (236 ft); 1991–2020 normals, extremes 1960–present
Month	Jan	Feb	Mar	Apr	May	Jun	Jul	Aug	Sep	Oct	Nov	Dec	Year
Record high °C (°F)	14.6 (58.3)	17.4 (63.3)	21.5 (70.7)	25.2 (77.4)	26.7 (80.1)	31.2 (88.2)	35.7 (96.3)	36.4 (97.5)	29.6 (85.3)	28.1 (82.6)	18.4 (65.1)	15.4 (59.7)	36.4 (97.5)
Mean daily maximum °C (°F)	7.5 (45.5)	8.1 (46.6)	10.3 (50.5)	13.2 (55.8)	16.3 (61.3)	19.1 (66.4)	21.1 (70.0)	20.7 (69.3)	18.1 (64.6)	14.2 (57.6)	10.3 (50.5)	7.7 (45.9)	13.9 (57.0)
Daily mean °C (°F)	4.3 (39.7)	4.6 (40.3)	6.3 (43.3)	8.6 (47.5)	11.5 (52.7)	14.4 (57.9)	16.3 (61.3)	16.0 (60.8)	13.7 (56.7)	10.4 (50.7)	6.9 (44.4)	4.5 (40.1)	9.8 (49.6)
Mean daily minimum °C (°F)	1.2 (34.2)	1.2 (34.2)	2.3 (36.1)	3.9 (39.0)	6.8 (44.2)	9.6 (49.3)	11.5 (52.7)	11.4 (52.5)	9.3 (48.7)	6.6 (43.9)	3.5 (38.3)	1.3 (34.3)	5.7 (42.3)
Record low °C (°F)	−21.4 (−6.5)	−12.9 (8.8)	−12.2 (10.0)	−5.9 (21.4)	−3.3 (26.1)	−0.5 (31.1)	2.5 (36.5)	0.8 (33.4)	−2.5 (27.5)	−5.9 (21.4)	−12.5 (9.5)	−25.2 (−13.4)	−25.2 (−13.4)
Average precipitation mm (inches)	57.4 (2.26)	43.3 (1.70)	43.4 (1.71)	47.1 (1.85)	53.6 (2.11)	59.0 (2.32)	57.6 (2.27)	64.2 (2.53)	61.1 (2.41)	68.8 (2.71)	60.8 (2.39)	66.3 (2.61)	682.5 (26.87)
Average snowfall mm (inches)	26 (1.0)	19 (0.7)	3 (0.1)	4 (0.2)	0 (0)	0 (0)	0 (0)	0 (0)	0 (0)	0 (0)	1 (0.0)	27 (1.1)	80 (3.1)
Average precipitation days (≥ 1.0 mm)	12.1	10.8	10.2	10.4	10.0	10.1	10.5	10.5	10.0	11.3	12.5	13.1	131.6
Average snowy days	3.0	2.9	1.1	0.3	0.0	0.0	0.0	0.0	0.0	0.0	0.2	1.6	9.1
Average relative humidity (%)	90	87	84	83	82	84	83	83	86	88	90	90	86
Mean monthly sunshine hours	52.8	74.9	114.6	158.1	194.9	187.5	193.3	168.0	134.7	97.5	61.8	49.9	1,487.8
Mean daily daylight hours	8.3	9.9	11.9	14.0	15.8	16.8	16.3	14.7	12.7	10.6	8.7	7.7	12.3
Average ultraviolet index	2	2	2	3	4	4	4	4	3	3	2	2	3
Source 1: Met Office European Climate Assessment and Dataset
Source 2: WeatherAtlas

=== Geology ===
Shropshire has a huge range of different types of rocks, stretching from the Precambrian until the Holocene. In the northern part of the county there are examples of Jurassic, Carboniferous, Permian and Triassic. Centrally, Precambrian, Cambrian, Ordovician, Carboniferous and Permian predominate. And in the south it is predominantly Silurian and Quaternary. Shropshire has a number of areas with Silurian and Ordovician rocks, where a number of shells, corals and trilobites can be found. Mortimer Forest and Wenlock Edge are examples where a number of fossils can be found.

=== Statistical ===
For Eurostat purposes, the county (less the unitary district of Telford and Wrekin) is a NUTS 3 region (code UKG22). The two Shropshire unitary areas (covering all of the ceremonial county), together with the authorities covering the ceremonial county of Staffordshire, comprise the "Shropshire and Staffordshire" NUTS 2 region.

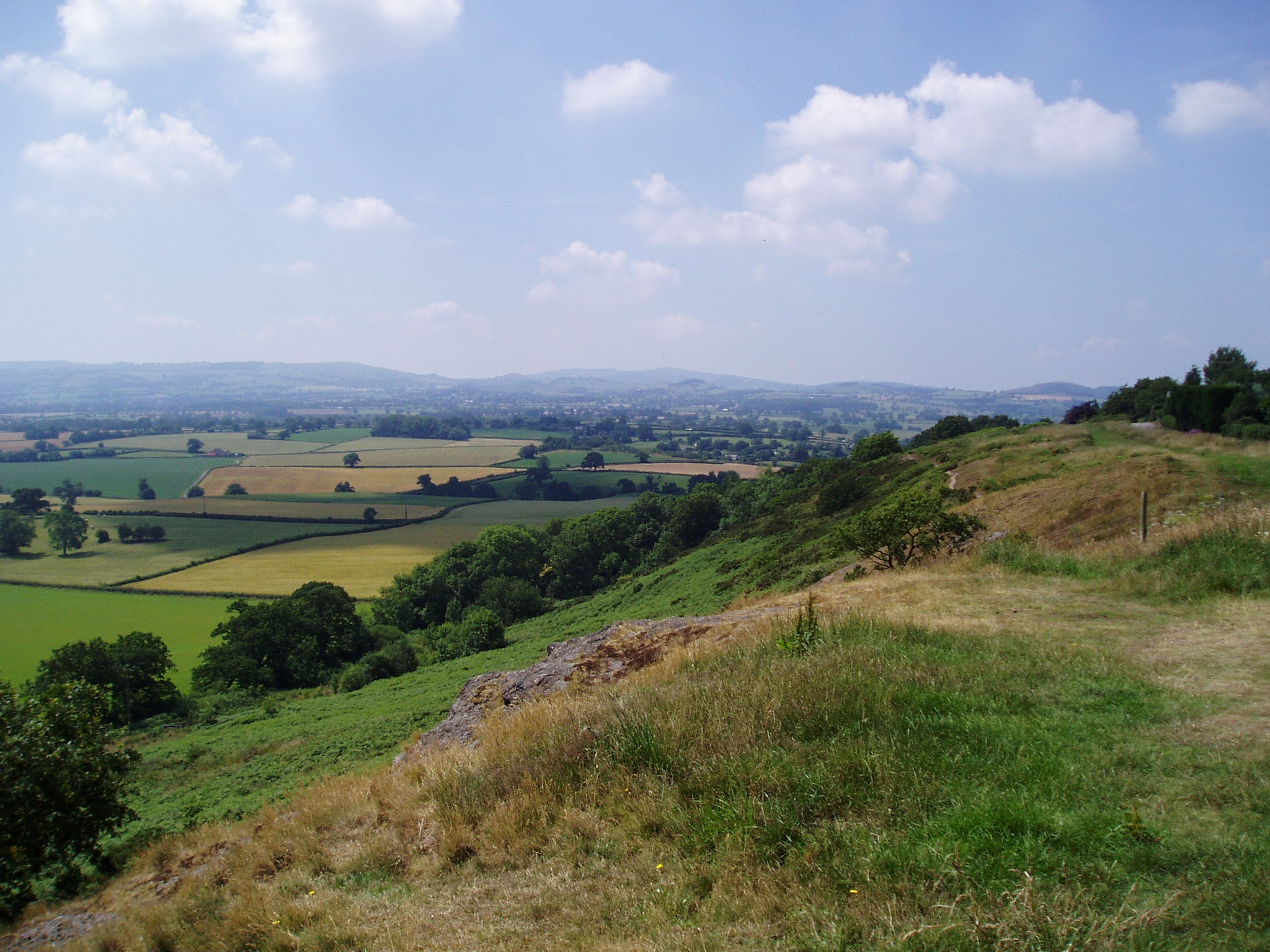
Rural Shropshire, Lyth Hill

== Towns and villages ==
Shropshire has no cities, but 22 towns, of which two can be considered major. Telford is the largest town in the county with a population of 138,241 (which is approximately 30% of the total Salopian populace); whereas the county town of Shrewsbury has a lower, but still sizeable population of 71,715 (15%). The other sizeable towns are Oswestry, Bridgnorth, Newport and Ludlow. The historic town of Wellington now makes up part of the Telford conurbation. The majority of the other settlements can be classed as villages or towns such as Much Wenlock or Whitchurch. Several villages have larger populations than the smallest town, Clun. The largest of these, Bayston Hill, is the 10th most populous settlement in the county. The names of several villages close to the border are of Welsh origin, such as Gobowen and Selattyn.

The larger settlements are primarily concentrated in a central belt that roughly follows the A5/M54 roadway. Other settlements are concentrated on rivers, for example Bridgnorth and Ironbridge on the Severn, or Ludlow on the Teme, as these waterways were historically vital for trade and a supply of water.

Telford Shrewsbury Oswestry Bridgnorth Newport Ludlow	Ceremonial county of Shropshire; Telford and Wrekin shown within Rivers, Motorways, 'A' Roads, Settlements	Largest settlements (by population) 2021: Telford (156,896); Shrewsbury (75,992); Oswestry (17,509); Newport (14,182) Bridgnorth (12,182) Market Drayton (12,066); Ludlow (10,039); Whitchurch (9,855); Shifnal (8,984); Bayston Hill (village) (5,079); Wem (5,142); Broseley (4,929); Church Stretton (4,671); Albrighton (village) (4,157); Ellesmere (3,835); Highley (village) (3,605); Pontesbury (village) (3,500); Shawbury (village) (2,872); Prees (village) (2,688); Much Wenlock (2,605); Craven Arms (2,289); Cleobury Mortimer (1,962); Bishop's Castle (1,893); Baschurch (village) (1,475); Ruyton-XI-Towns (village) (1,379); Clun (680)

The town of Telford was created by the merger and expansion of older, small towns to the north and east of The Wrekin. These towns now have sizeable populations that now make up the population of Telford: Wellington (20,430), Madeley (17,935), Dawley (11,399) and Oakengates (8,517), but the Telford and Wrekin borough towns incentive aims to make Oakengates into the largest of the towns.

Historically, all or parts of the towns of Halesowen, Smethwick and Oldbury, as well as the Quinton suburb of Birmingham, were in Shropshire.

== Politics ==
Election results 2001

Election results 2005 & 2010

=== Parliamentary constituencies ===
The county has five parliamentary constituencies. In the July 2024 General Election, two returned Conservative MPs, two Labour and one Liberal Democrat.

At the 2005 general election, four returned Conservative MPs, Telford, returned a Labour MP. This was a marked change from the 2001 general election result, where the county returned only one Conservative, three Labour and a Liberal Democrat MP to the House of Commons (see maps to the right) (Labour = Red, Conservatives = Blue and Liberal Democrats = Orange).

The current MPs of Shropshire, following the 2024 General Election, are:

- Shaun Davies, Labour, Telford (covering the town of Telford)
- Helen Morgan, Liberal Democrat, North Shropshire (covering the former North Shropshire and Oswestry districts, now coextensive with the North area committee)
- Stuart Anderson, Conservative, South Shropshire (covering the former Ludlow and (the majority of) Bridgnorth districts; now co-extensive with the South area committee except for the part covered by The Wrekin constituency)
- Julia Buckley, Labour, Shrewsbury (covering the former Shrewsbury and Atcham district; now co-extensive with the Central area committee)
- Mark Pritchard, Conservative, The Wrekin (covering Telford and Wrekin borough, minus Telford, and including a small area of the former Bridgnorth district/South area committee)

Constituency	1992	1997	2001	2005	2010	2015	2017	2021
Ludlow	CON Christopher Gill		LD Matthew Green	CON Philip Dunne				
North Shropshire	CON John Biffen	CON Owen Paterson						LD Helen Morgan
Shrewsbury & Atcham	CON Derek Conway	LAB Paul Marsden	LD Paul Marsden	CON Daniel Kawczynski				
Telford	LAB Bruce Grocott*	LAB Bruce Grocott	LAB David Wright			CON Lucy Allan		
The Wrekin	LAB Bruce Grocott*	LAB Peter Bradley		CON Mark Pritchard				

- Note (*), The Wrekin (historic UK Parliament constituency) was split at the 1997 election.

2021 refers to the by election in North Shropshire only.

=== Divisions and environs ===
Most of the ceremonial county of Shropshire is covered for purposes of local government by Shropshire Council, a unitary authority established in 2009. Telford and Wrekin is a unitary authority, with borough status, which forms part of the county for various functions such as Lord Lieutenant but is a separate local authority from Shropshire Council. Many services are shared by both authorities, such as the fire and rescue service, and the two authorities co-operate on some projects such as mapping flood risk.

The new unitary authority for Shropshire, Shropshire Council, divides the county into three areas, each with its own area committee: North, Central and South. These area committees deal with town and country planning matters.

With the parishing of the formerly unparished area of Shrewsbury in 2008, the entire ceremonial county is now parished. The sizes of parishes varies enormously in terms of area covered and population resident. Shrewsbury is the most populous parish in the county (and one of the most populous in England) with over 70,000 residents, whilst Boscobel is the smallest parish in Shropshire by geographical area and by population, with just 12 residents according to the 2001 census. The smaller parishes (with populations of less than 200) usually have a joint parish council with one or more neighbouring parishes, or in some instances, have a parish meeting (such as in Sibdon Carwood). The urban area of Telford is divided into many parishes, each covering a particular suburb, some of which are historic villages or towns (such as Madeley). The parish remains an important sub-division and tier of local government in both unitary authority areas of Shropshire.

=== Local government 1974–2009 ===
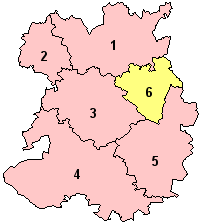
The ceremonial county prior to the 2009 local government restructuring, with just Telford & Wrekin as a unitary authority (shown yellow)

In 1974 the non-metropolitan county of Salop was constituted, covering the entire county. After a local campaign, the council voted 48-5 to revert to Shropshire from 1 April 1980. There was a two-tier system of local government, constituting a county council (as the upper tier) and six district councils – Bridgnorth, North Shropshire, Oswestry, Shrewsbury and Atcham, South Shropshire and The Wrekin. In 1998 The Wrekin became a unitary authority, administratively separate from the county council, and became Telford and Wrekin. The two-tier structure remained in the remainder of the county and was the least populated two-tier area in England.

Oswestry and Shrewsbury & Atcham were each granted borough status in 1974. Telford and Wrekin became a borough in 2002.

=== 2009 restructuring ===
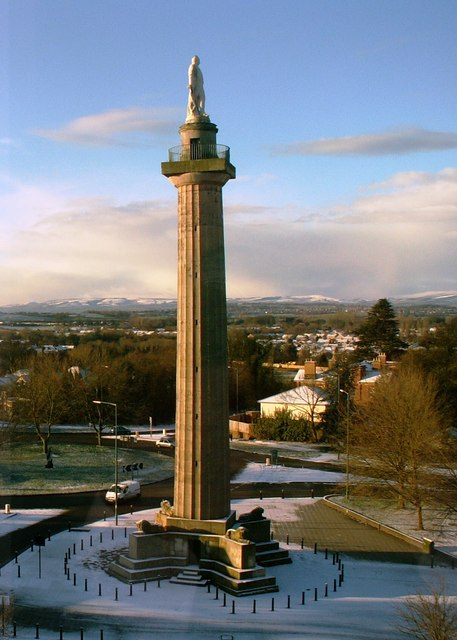
Shropshire's Shirehall is located opposite Lord Hill's Column.

In 2006 a local government white paper supported proposals for new unitary authorities to be set up in England in certain areas. Existing non-metropolitan counties with small populations, such as Cornwall, Northumberland and Shropshire, were favoured by the government to be covered by unitary authorities in one form or another (the county either becoming a single unitary authority, or be broken into a number of unitary authorities). For the counties in the 2009 reorganisation, existing unitary authority areas within the counties' ceremonial boundaries (such as Telford and Wrekin) were not to be affected and no boundary changes were planned.

Shropshire County Council, supported by South Shropshire District Council and Oswestry Borough Council, proposed to the government that the non-metropolitan county of Shropshire become a single unitary authority. This was opposed by the other three districts in the county, with Shrewsbury & Atcham Borough Council taking their objection to the High Court in a judicial review.

The proposal to create a Shropshire unitary authority, covering the area of the existing non-metropolitan county, was supported by the DCLG and 1 April 2009 was set as the date for the re-organisation to take place. The first elections to Shropshire Council took place on 4 June 2009, with the former Shropshire County Council being the continuing authority and its councillors became the first members of the new Shropshire Council on 1 April.

Part of the proposals include parishing and establishing a town council for Shrewsbury. The parish was created on 13 May 2008 and is the second most populous civil parish in England (only Weston-super-Mare has a greater population) with a population of over 70,000.

=== Political control of councils ===
Shropshire Council was under Conservative control from the first election held in 2009 until that of 2025, when the Liberal Democrats took control; Telford and Wrekin Council has been under Labour control since 2011.

== Economy ==
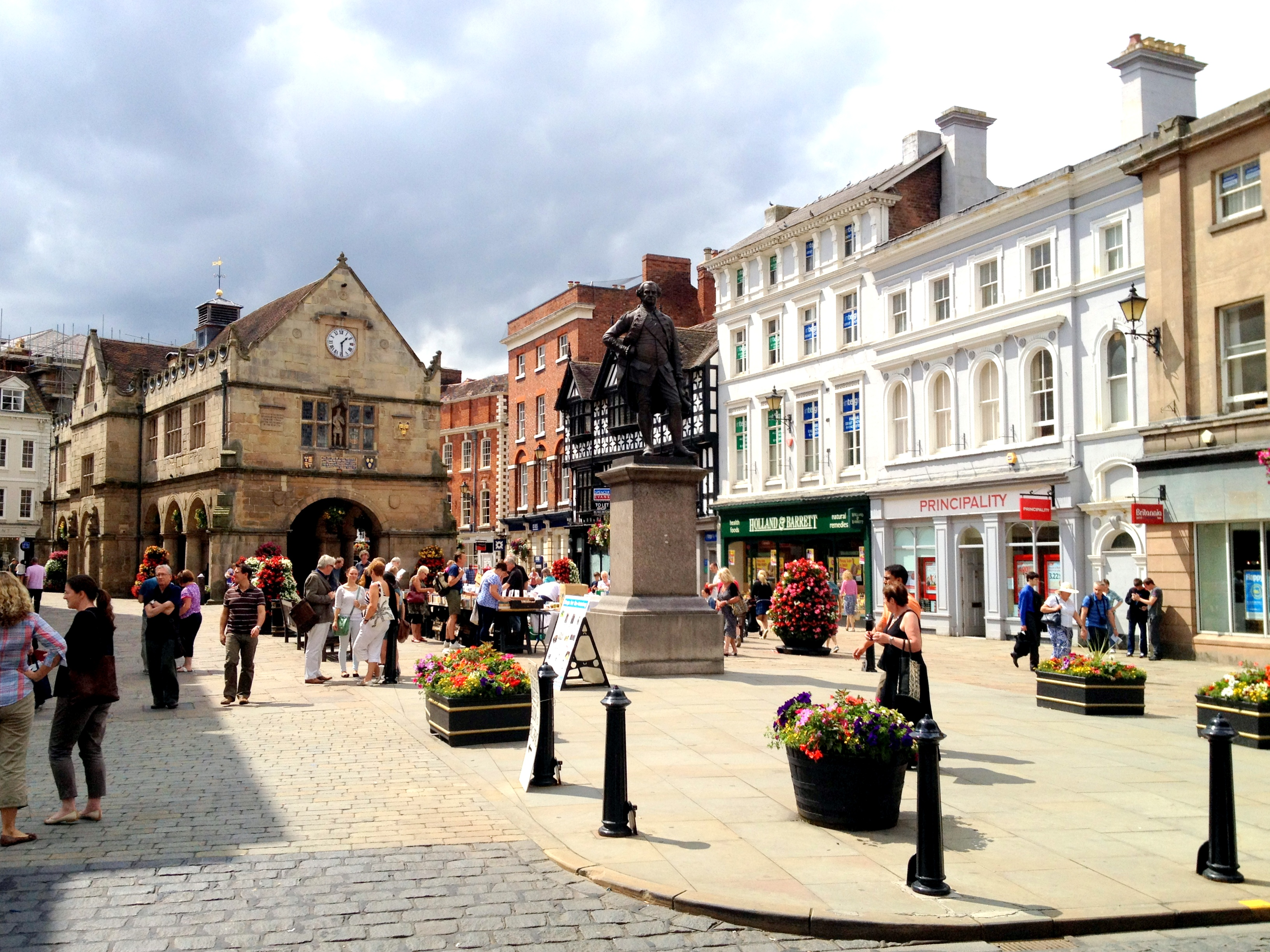
Shrewsbury's town centre contains the Darwin, Pride Hill and Riverside shopping centres, as well as more traditional historic retail areas.

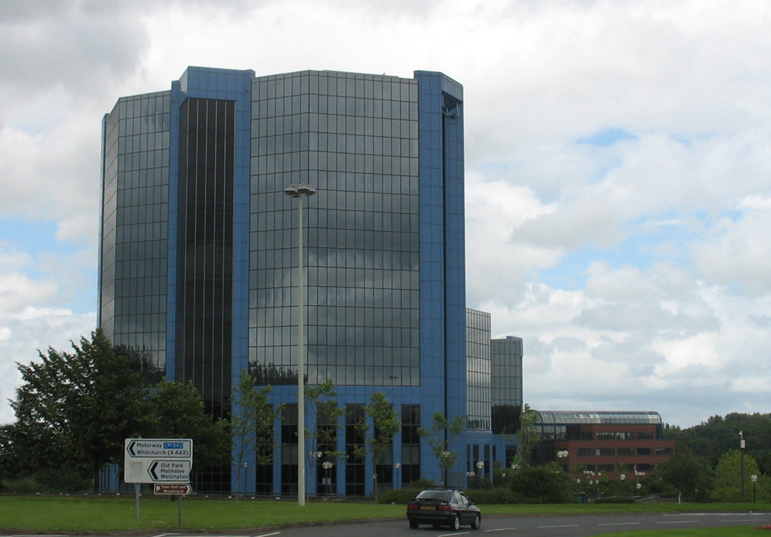
Telford Plaza in Telford Town Centre

Traditionally, agriculture has dominated the economy of Shropshire. The area later became more service-oriented. The county town of Shrewsbury, the historic castle-dominated Ludlow, the International Olympic Movement's reputed birthplace Much Wenlock and the industrial birthplace of Ironbridge Gorge are the foremost tourist areas in Shropshire, along with the restored canal-network which provides narrowboat holidays on the Shropshire Union Canal and other canals in the region. The natural beauty of the county draws people to all areas. In 2024, Shropshire was listed on the ABTA's list of global destinations to watch for its 'beautiful landscapes, towns and villages'.

Industry is mostly found in Telford, Oswestry, Whitchurch, Market Drayton and Shrewsbury, though small industrial estates have developed in most of the market towns as well as on former airfields in rural areas. In towns such as Whitchurch, much of the high street is predominantly composed of small independent business which specialise in handmade items or antiques. Shrewsbury is becoming a centre for distribution and warehousing, as it is located on a nodal point of the regional road-network.

Telford is the base for a number of concerns. Rayburn Range and Aga Rangemaster Group are based there. The MoD have a significant depot at Donnington. Here are also high-technology industries such as Unimation, Nikon, Hitachi Maxell, Ricoh, Capgemini, Fujitsu and Electronic Data Systems. In Hadley Castle, Denso Manufacturing UK Ltd make car air-conditioning systems and GKN Wheels make car wheels. Makita Manufacturing Europe at Hortonwood, Telford is the only plant in the UK that makes power tools.

In Telford, a new rail freight facility was opened in 2009 by Telford and Wrekin Council at Donnington with the future goal of extending the line to Stafford.

Telford and Shrewsbury are the county's two main retail centres, with contrasting styles of shopping – Shrewsbury's largely historic streets and Telford's large modern mall, Telford Shopping Centre. Shrewsbury also has two medium-sized shopping centres, the indoor "Pride Hill" and "Darwin" centres (both located on Pride Hill), and (prior to its demolition in 2024) a smaller, partially covered, "Riverside Mall". Shrewsbury's location as the nearest substantial town for those in a large area of mid-Wales helps it draw in considerable numbers of shoppers, notably on Saturdays.

Well-known food companies in Shropshire include Müller Dairy (UK) Ltd in Market Drayton, which also has a plant at Minsterley and makes chilled desserts for Tesco. Also based in Market Drayton is Palethorpes, part of Pork Farms, which make own-label sausages. At Crudgington, Dairy Crest made Country Life butter and Clover until February 2015, and had their Technical Centre which, following the site's closure, relocated to Harper Adams University. Anglo Beef Processors (ABP Food Group) are at Harlescott in the north of Shrewsbury.

The Royal Air Force operates two bases at RAF Cosford and RAF Shawbury, where military helicopter training in the UK takes place, alongside training for the RAF's air traffic controllers (ATCs). The charity PDSA has its head office in Priorslee, Telford.

BT have their National Network Management Centre (Whittington House) in Whittington near Oswestry.

=== Statistics ===
Below is the chart of regional gross value added for the non-metropolitan county (that is, excluding Telford & Wrekin) of Shropshire at current basic prices, with figures in millions of British pounds sterling.

Year	Regional gross value added	Agriculture	Industry	Services
1995	2,388	238	618	1,533
2000	2,977	177	739	2,061
2003	3,577	197	843	2,538

With the statistics for the borough of Telford and Wrekin included, the following represents the ceremonial county:

Year	Regional gross value added	Agriculture	Industry	Services
1995	4,151	266	1,483	2,403
2000	5,049	197	1,512	3,340
2003	5,947	218	1,693	4,038

== Education ==
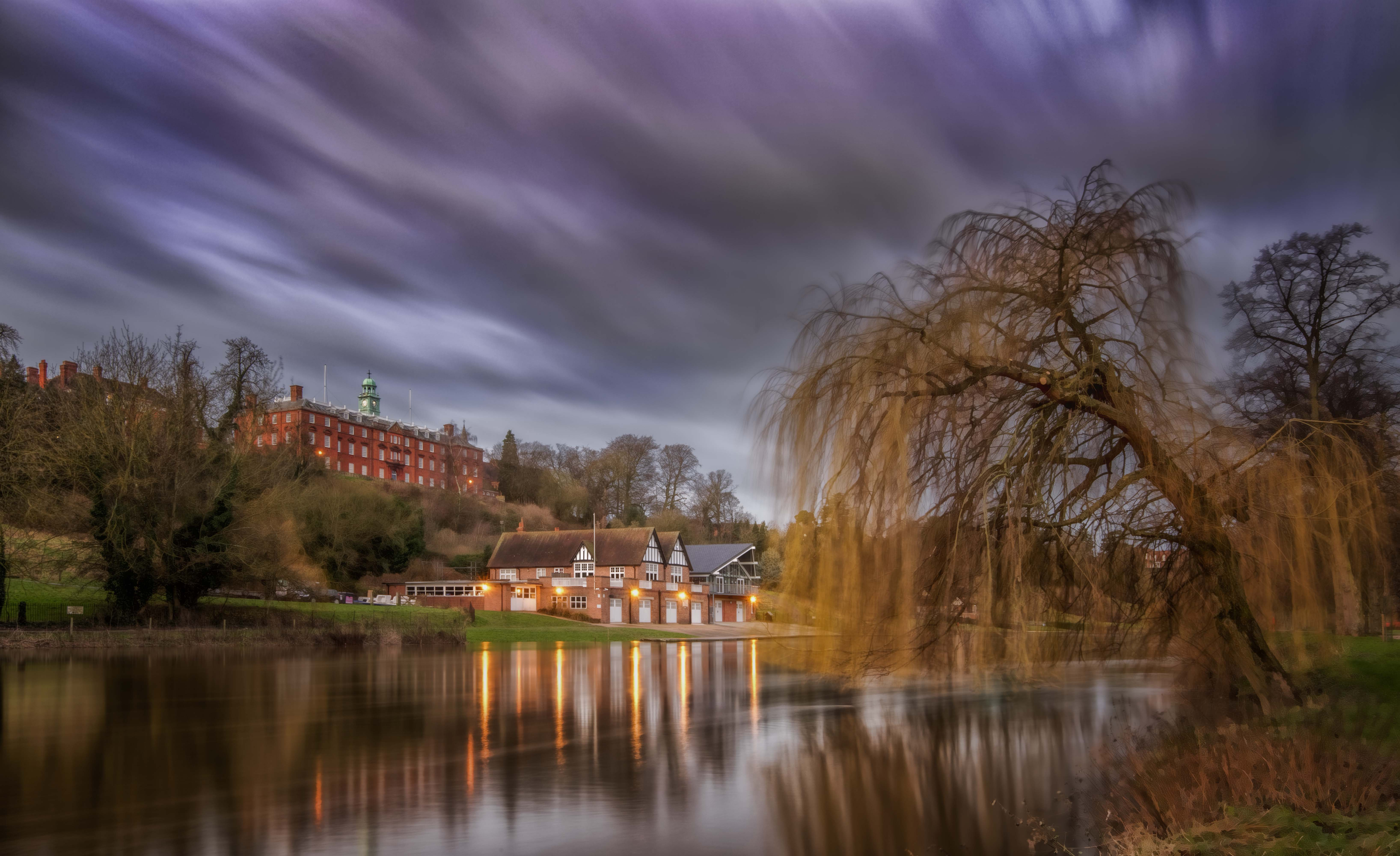
Shrewsbury School, with its boathouse on the River Severn in the foreground

The Shropshire Council area has a completely comprehensive education system, whilst in the borough of Telford and Wrekin there are two selective schools, both of which are located in Newport—these are the Haberdashers' Adams School and Newport Girls' High School (both of which are ranked within the top thirty schools in the country). In Telford itself is the Thomas Telford School, ranked as one of the best comprehensive schools in England.

Some Shropshire children attend schools in Wales, including Llanfyllin High School.

The county has many independent schools, such as Oswestry School (founded in 1407), Shrewsbury School, (founded in 1552), and Ellesmere College (founded in 1884).

There are three sixth-form colleges located in Shropshire: the New College, Telford, Shrewsbury Sixth Form College and Ludlow College. Haberdashers’ Adams and Newport Girls' High Schools both provide sixth-form education as well as secondary education.

There are also two institutions of higher education in Shropshire, the Telford campus of the University of Wolverhampton and in Edgmond, near Newport, Harper Adams University, which formerly offered mostly agriculture-based degrees but is expanding its range of provision. A third higher education institution was created in Shrewsbury in 2015, which is a campus of the University of Chester.

In Ironbridge, the University of Birmingham operates the Ironbridge Institute in partnership with the Ironbridge Gorge Museum Trust, which offers postgraduate and professional development courses in heritage.

Shropshire has the highest educational attainment in the West Midlands region.

== Transport ==
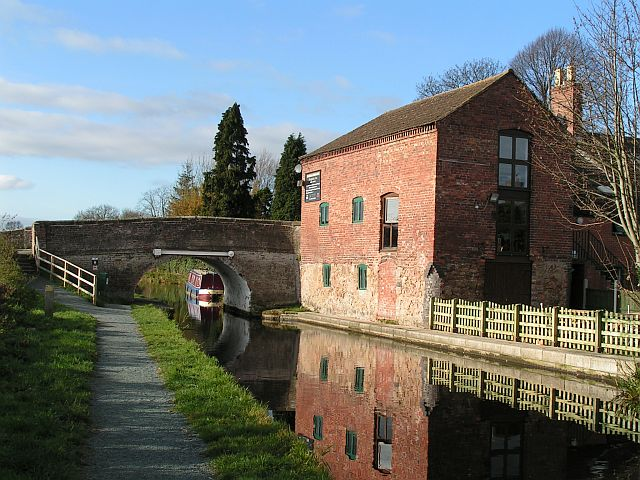
Montgomery Canal at Maesbury Marsh

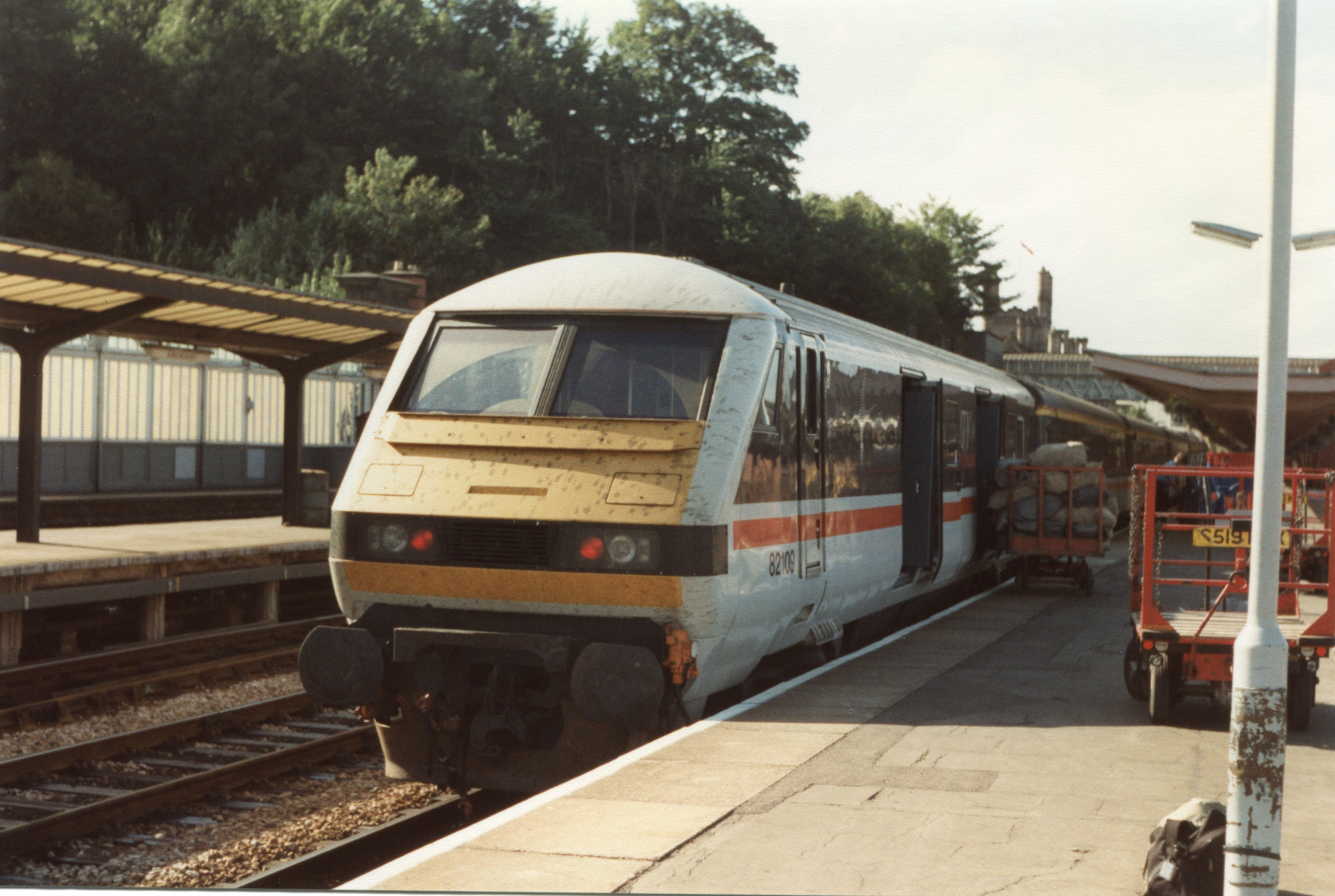
The direct InterCity from Shrewsbury to London Euston with a DVT and mailbags delivering the Royal Mail at a time when British Rail ran the network

Shropshire is connected to the rest of the United Kingdom via a number of road and rail links. Historically, rivers and later canals in the county were used for transport also, although their use in transport is now significantly reduced. The county's main transport hub is Shrewsbury, through which many significant roads and railways pass and join.

Canals in Britain were originally constructed for the transport of goods, but are now mainly used for leisure. In northern Shropshire three canals with a total navigable length of 41 miles (66 km) are managed by the Canal & River Trust: the Shropshire Union Canal (from north of Adderley to near Knighton), the Llangollen Canal (from Chirk Aqueduct to Grindley Brook) and the Montgomery Canal (from its beginning at Frankton Junction to Llanymynech). In addition, the Shrewsbury and Newport Canal potentially could be restored in the future.

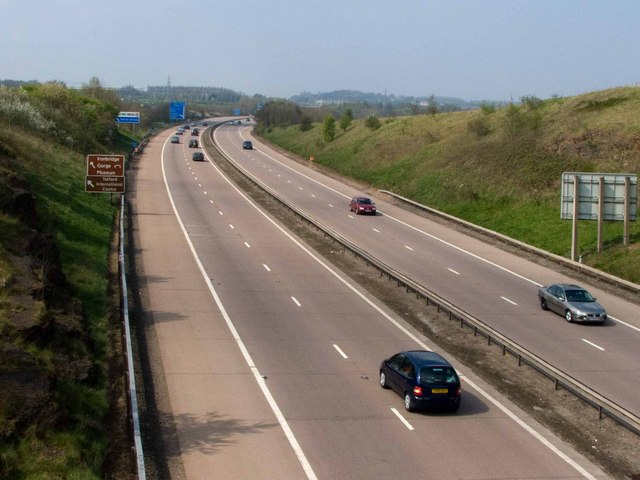
The M54 Motorway runs through the east of the county, as far as Wellington.

Major roads in the county include the M54 motorway, which connects Shropshire to the rest of the motorway network, and more specifically to the West Midlands county. The A5 also runs through the county, in an east–west direction. The road formerly ran through Shrewsbury, although a large dual-carriageway bypass has since been built. Other major trunk roads in the county include the north–south A49, the A53 and the A41.

There are a number of major railway lines running through the county, including the Welsh Marches Line, the Heart of Wales Line, the Cambrian Line, the Shrewsbury to Chester Line and the Wolverhampton to Shrewsbury Line, as well as heritage railways including the well established Severn Valley Railway. The Cambrian Heritage Railway exists in Oswestry. The three train operating companies working in the county are West Midlands Trains, Transport for Wales and Avanti West Coast. A new company, Wrexham & Shropshire, commenced services from Shropshire to London Marylebone, in spring 2008 but the service was discontinued on 28 January 2011 leaving Shrewsbury without a direct link to the capital. Virgin Trains (the operator at the time) recommenced services from Shrewsbury to London Euston on 11 December 2014, having withdrawn them in the late 1990s, however, their successor Avanti West Coast is set to withdraw service once again in June 2024.

Two major water supply aqueducts run across Shropshire; the Elan aqueduct running through South Shropshire carrying water from Elan Valley to Birmingham and the Vyrnwy Aqueduct running through North Shropshire delivering water from Lake Vyrnwy to Liverpool.

== Media ==
The county is served by BBC West Midlands and ITV Central television, and BBC Radio Shropshire. County-wide commercial radio stations are Hits Radio Black Country & Shropshire, Greatest Hits Radio Black Country & Shropshire, Heart West Midlands, Capital North West and Wales, Smooth West Midlands and Sunshine Radio (serving Ludlow and southern parts of Shropshire).

The Shropshire Star newspaper covers the county.

== Places of interest ==
- Acton Scott Heritage Farm, nr. Church Stretton
- Adcote nr. Shrewsbury
- Attingham Park, Atcham
- Benthall Hall, Broseley
- Blists Hill, Madeley
- Boscobel House, nr. Wolverhampton
- Bridgnorth Cliff Railway, Bridgnorth
- Bridgnorth Castle, Bridgnorth
- Brown Clee Hill, South Shropshire
- Buildwas Abbey, Buildwas
- Burford House
- Caer Caradoc, nr. Church Stretton
- Cambrian Heritage Railway, Oswestry and Llynclys
- Chetwynd Park, Newport
- Cardingmill Valley, Church Stretton
- Clun Castle, Clun
- Flounder's Folly, nr. Craven Arms
- Fordhall castle and farm
- Haughmond Hill, nr. Shrewsbury
- Haughmond Abbey
- Hawkstone Park, North Shropshire
- Hopton Castle, nr. Craven Arms
- Ironbridge Gorge
- Kynaston's Cave, nr. Nesscliffe
- Langley Chapel, nr. Shrewsbury
- Lilleshall Abbey, nr Newport
- The Long Mynd, Church Stretton
- Ludlow Castle, Ludlow
- Mitchell's Fold, nr. Chirbury
- Moreton Corbet Castle, Moreton Corbet
- Newport Guildhall, Newport
- Offa's Dyke Path, Welsh Marches
- Puleston Cross, Newport
- Severn Valley Railway, Bridgnorth
- Shrewsbury Abbey, Shrewsbury
- Shrewsbury Castle, Shrewsbury
- Shropshire Hills Area of Outstanding Natural Beauty (AONB), South Shropshire
- Shropshire Union Canal
- Snailbeach Lead Mines nr. Shrewsbury
- South Telford Heritage Trail, Telford
- Soulton Hall nr. Wem
- St Laurence Church, Ludlow
- The Stiperstones, nr Pontesbury
- Stokesay Castle, nr Craven Arms
- Sunnycroft, Wellington
- Telford Steam Railway, Telford
- Titterstone Clee Hill, nr. Ludlow
- Wenlock Edge, Much Wenlock
- Wenlock Priory
- White Ladies Priory
- Whittington Castle, nr. Oswestry
- The Wrekin (and Ercall) nr. Wellington
- Wroxeter Roman City, Wroxeter, nr. Atcham

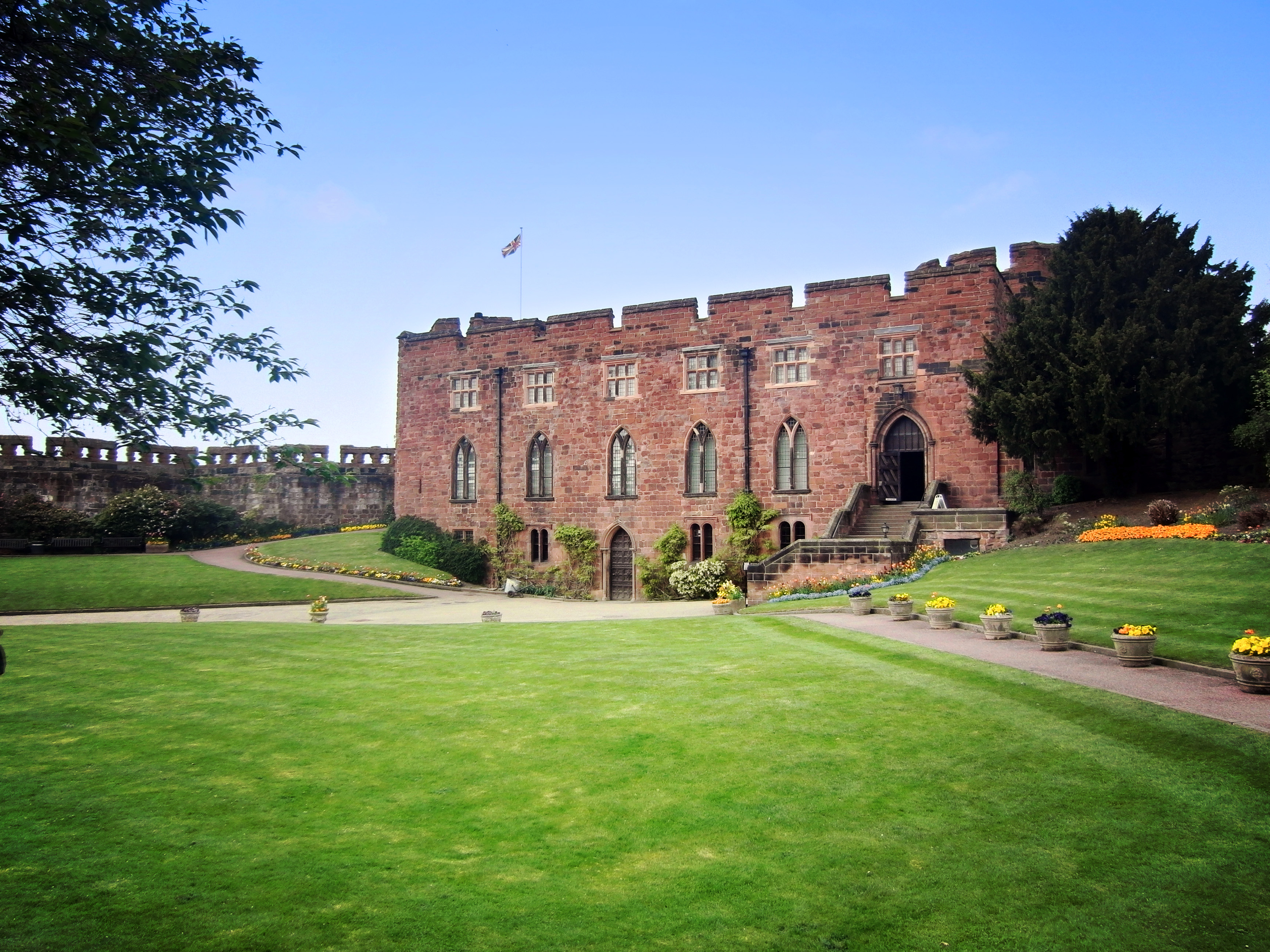
Shrewsbury Castle

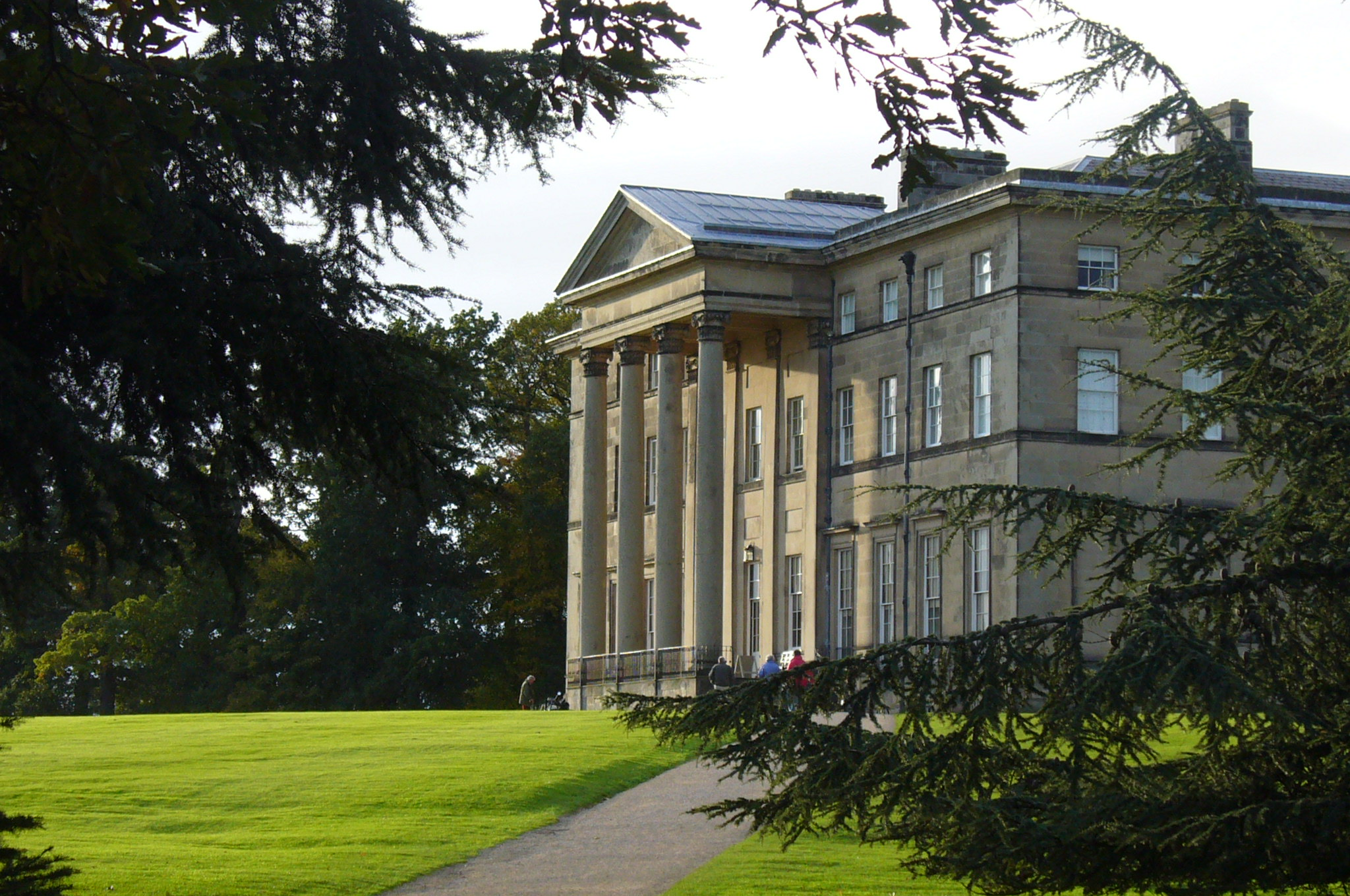
Attingham Park Mansion

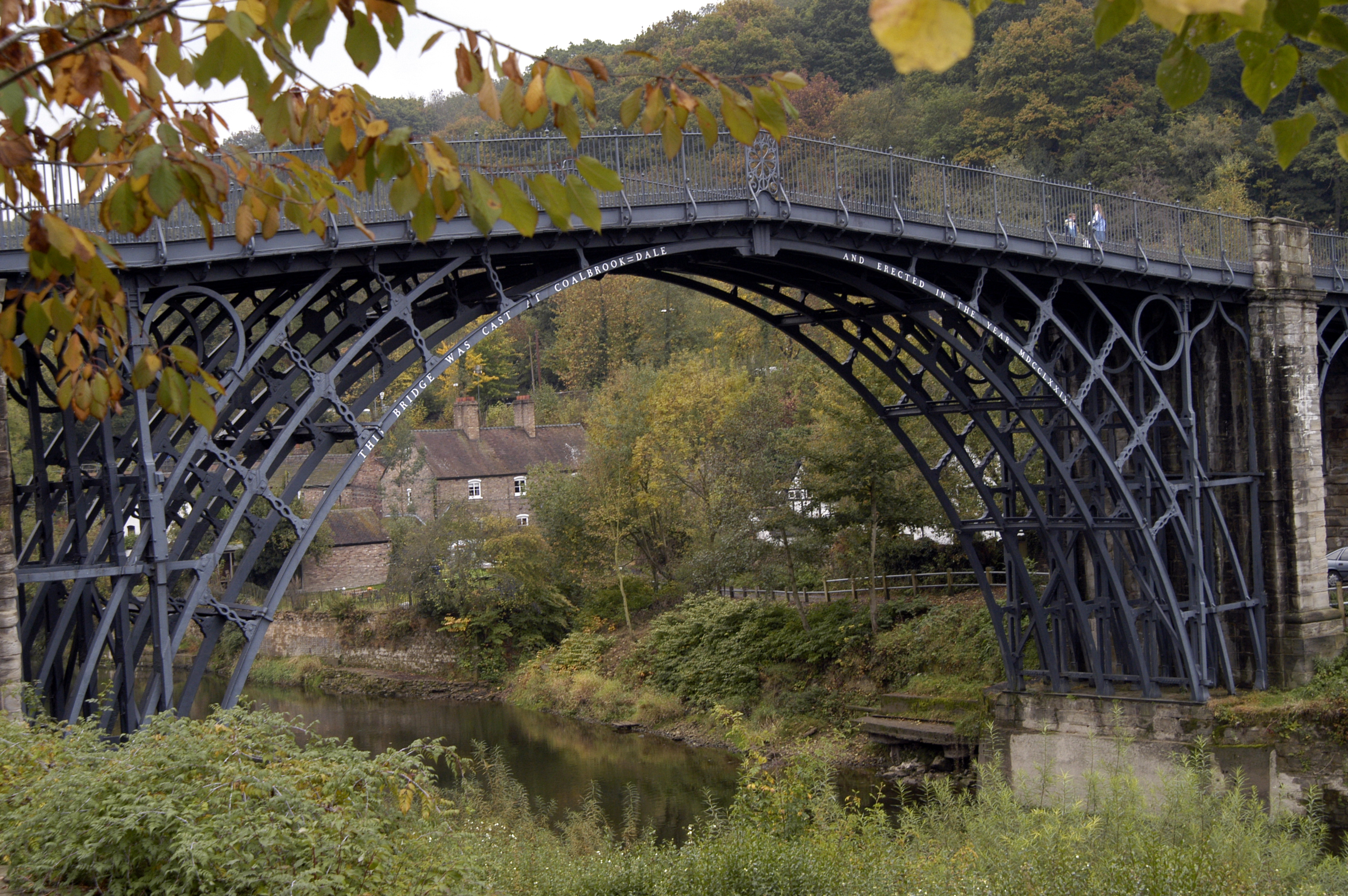
Ironbridge

== Notable people ==
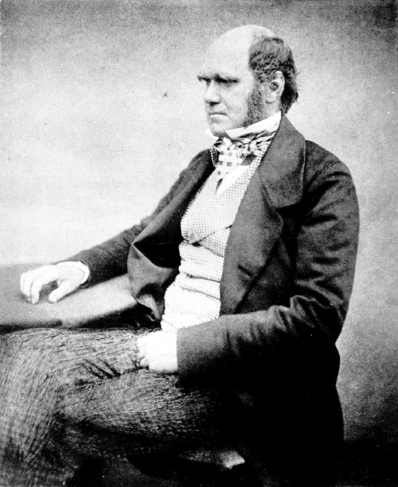
Charles Darwin, 1854

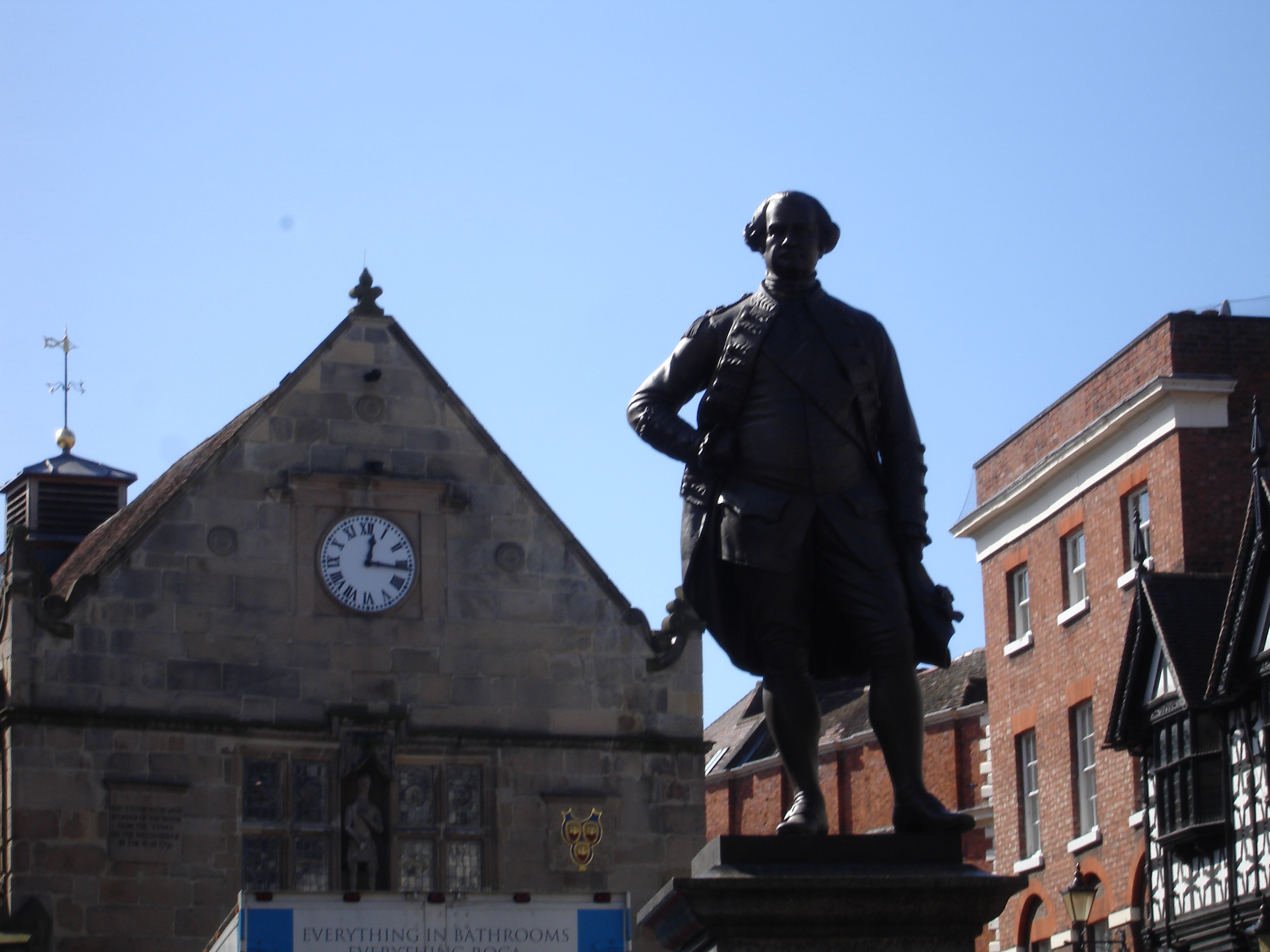
Clive of India statue in Shrewsbury's Square

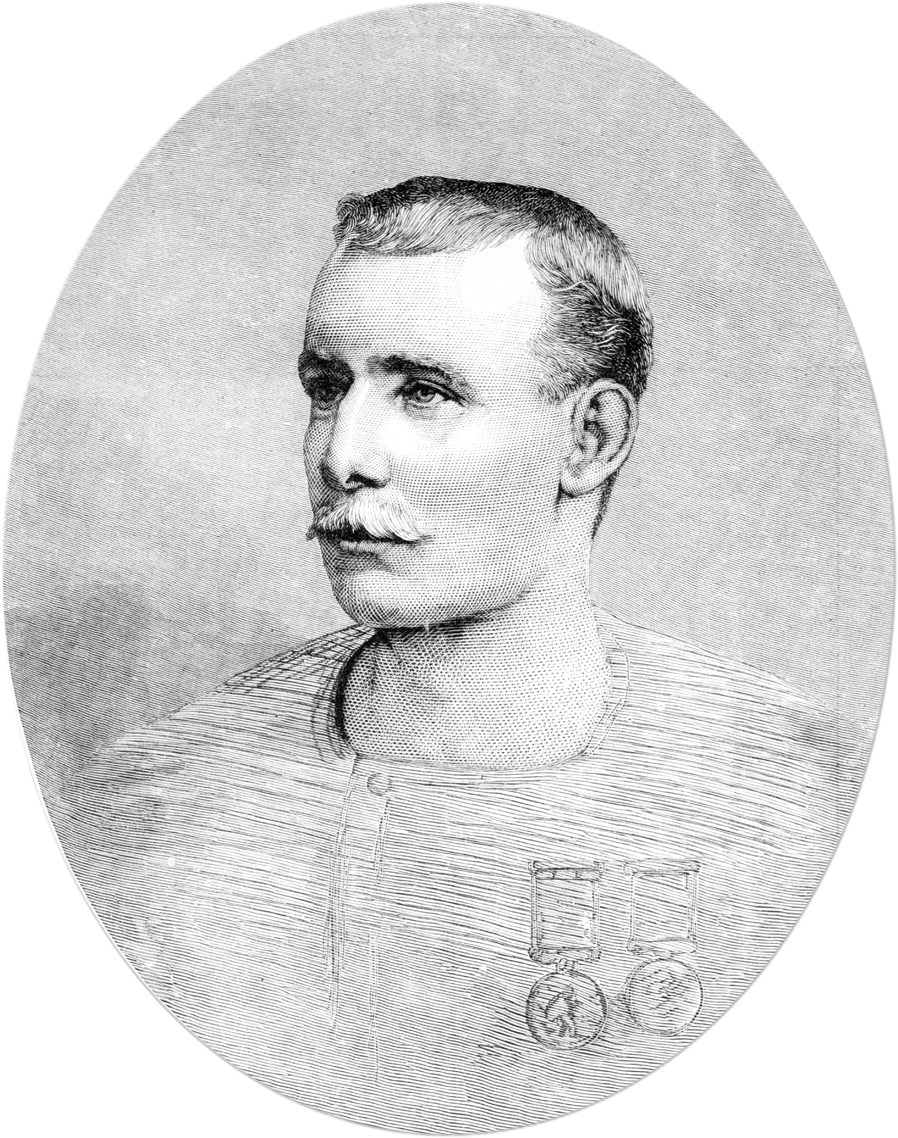
Captain Matthew Webb, 1883

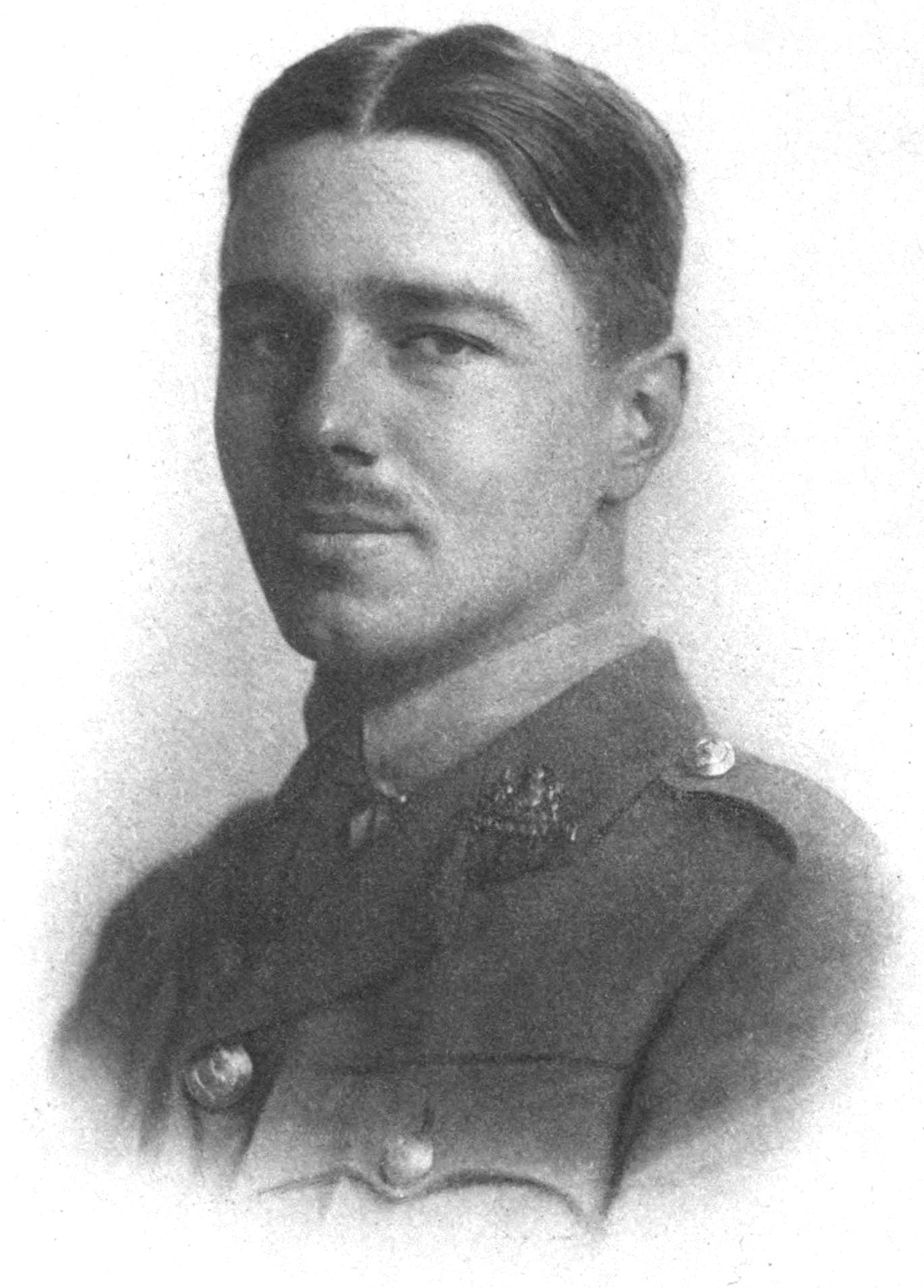
Wilfred Owen, 1920 plate

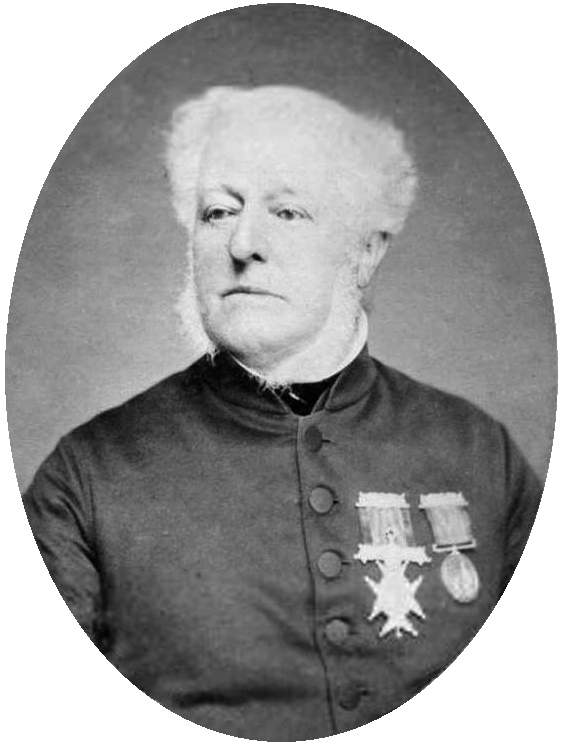
William Penny Brookes, 1875

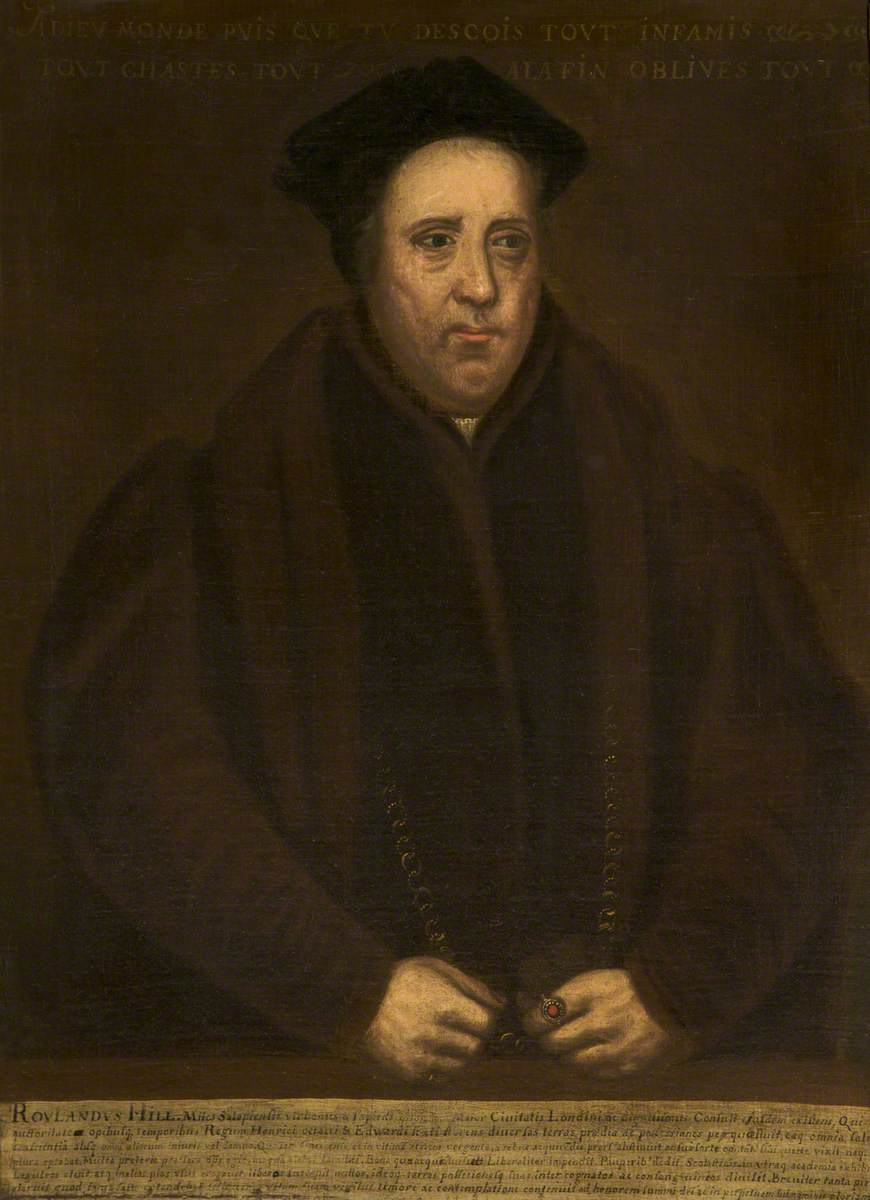
Sir Rowland Hill, coordinator of the Geneva Bible and possible inspiration for As You Like It, was from the county.

- Abraham Darby, early industrialist
- Adrian Jones, sculptor of the Quadriga at Hyde Park Corner
- Barbara Pym, novelist
- Carol Decker, lead singer of the 1980s pop group T'Pau, went to school in Shropshire
- Charles Babbage, early computing pioneer, lived at Dudmaston Hall in 1814
- Charles Darwin, eminent naturalist developed the theory of evolution by natural selection, born in Shrewsbury
- Chris Hawkins, radio presenter and DJ, born in Loppington
- Craig Phillips, of Newport, winner of Big Brother 2000
- Dominic Sandbrook, historian and TV presenter
- Edith Pargeter (1913–1995), author
- Edmund Plowden (1518–1585), legal scholar and theorist
- Sir Edmund Plowden (1590–1659), proprietor, Earl Palatine and Governor of New Albion
- Edric the Wild, Anglo-Saxon magnate
- Edward Waring (1736–1798), mathematician
- Eglantyne Jebb of Ellesmere, social reformer and founder of the Save the Children Fund
- Fred Jordan, farm worker from Ludlow and one of the great traditional English singers
- George Jeffreys, of Wem, infamous judge
- Georgina Frederica Jackson, compiler of Shropshire Word-Book
- Greg Davies, comedian and actor grew up in Wem
- Humphrey Kynaston (died 1534), highwayman
- Isobel Cooper (Izzy), opera singer from Much Wenlock
- Ivan Jones, writer of The Ghost Hunter
- Jesse Armstrong, screenwriter and producer, creator of Emmy-winning TV show 'Succession', and co-creator of comedy TV shows 'Peep Show' and 'Fresh Meat'
- John Benbow, Admiral of the White, born in Shrewsbury
- John Mytton, 'Mad Jack' Mytton, Regency rake, MP, gambler and horseman
- John Wilkinson, of Broseley, industrialist
- Jonathan Corbett, TV presenter
- K. K. Downing, guitarist with Judas Priest
- Lara Jones, writer of the Poppy Cat books
- Len Murray, former head of the T.U.C.
- Lord Acton, 19th-century historian
- Mal Lewis Jones, writer
- Mary Beard, classicist and public personality at Cambridge University
- Mary Esther Harding (1888–1971), British-American Jungian analyst
- Mary Webb (1881–1927), author
- Mirabel Osler, author
- Pete Postlethwaite, actor, lived near Church Stretton until his death in 2011
- Sir Philip Sidney, prominent Elizabethan
- Richard Lee I, first member of the Lee family of America. Ancestor of Thomas Lee, Francis Lightfoot Lee, Richard Henry Lee, Henry Lee III, Thomas Sim Lee, and Confederate General Robert E. Lee.
- Robert Clive, 1st Baron Clive, 'Clive of India', born near Market Drayton
- Sir Rowland Hill, coordinator of the Geneva Bible and possible inspiration for As You Like It
- Rowland Hill, 1st Viscount Hill, Napoleonic era general
- Stewart Lee, stand-up comedian, writer and director
- Sybil Ruscoe, TV and radio presenter
- Trevor Rees-Jones, bodyguard and author
- Tricia Sullivan, American science fiction author, lives in Shropshire
- Wilfred Owen, leading First World War poet
- William Farr, epidemiologist and early bio-statistician
- William Henry Griffith Thomas (1861–1924), evangelical Anglican theologian
- William Wycherley, Restoration dramatist and playwright known for The Country Wife
- William Sommers, court jester of Henry VIII of England was born in Shropshire

=== Sports ===
- Alison Williamson, of Church Stretton, archery Olympic bronze medalist
- Amy Bagshaw, international gymnast
- Billy Wright, born in Ironbridge, Wolverhampton Wanderers footballer and England captain
- David Edwards, footballer (born in Pontesbury), Shrewsbury Town F.C & Wales
- Ernie Clements, cyclist
- Saffron Lane, ice hockey player
- Sir Gordon Richards (1902–1986), 26 times flat racing Champion Jockey, born at Donnington Wood
- Harry Weetman, golfer, born Oswestry
- Ian Woosnam, golfer, born Oswestry, grew up at St. Martin's
- Joe Hart, born in Shrewsbury, Celtic and England goalkeeper
- Matthew Jones, footballer
- Matthew Webb, first man to swim the English Channel
- Sandy Lyle, golfer, born Shrewsbury
- William Penny Brookes, from Much Wenlock, founder of Wenlock Olympian Games

== Sport ==
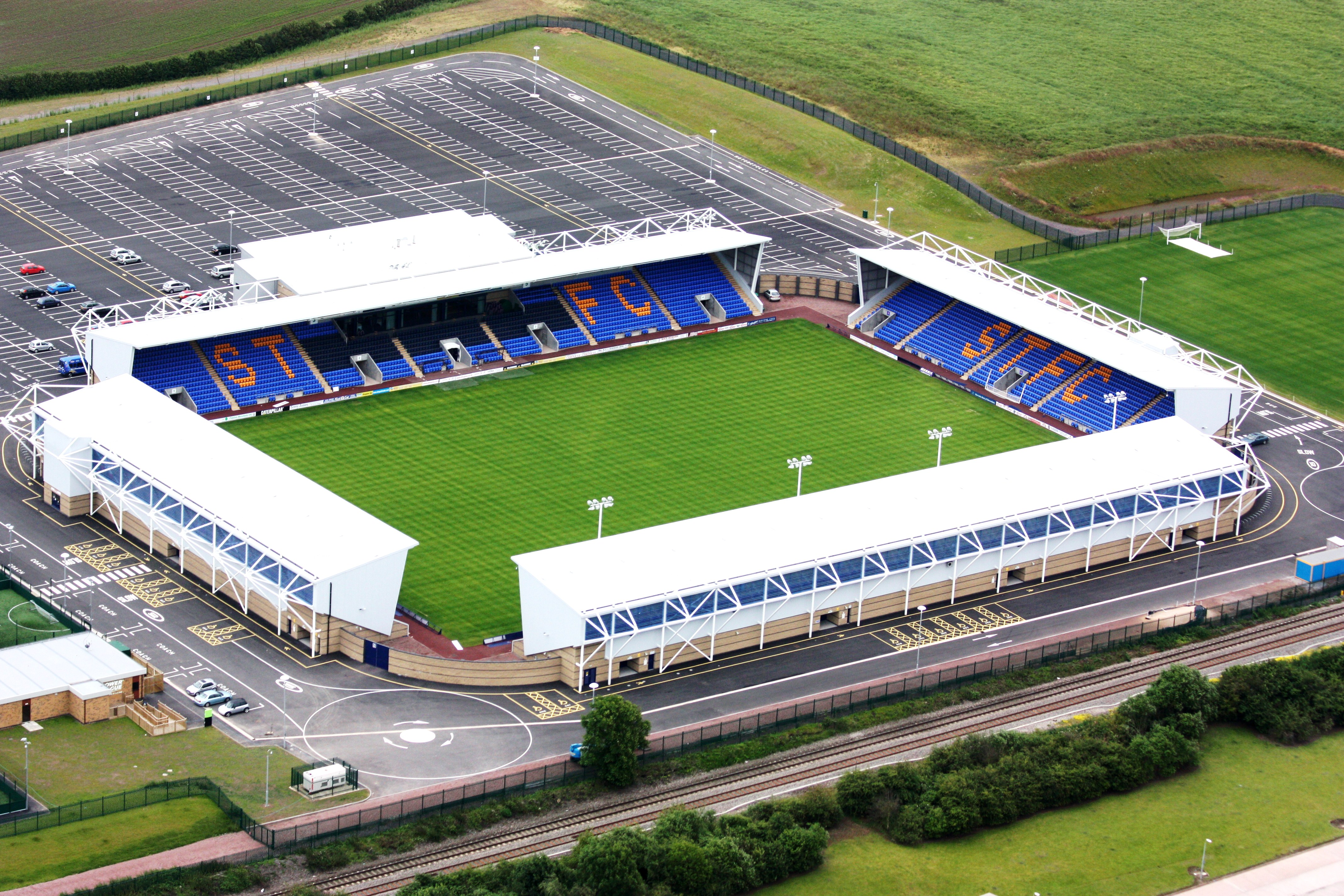
The New Meadow football stadium, home to Shrewsbury Town Football Club

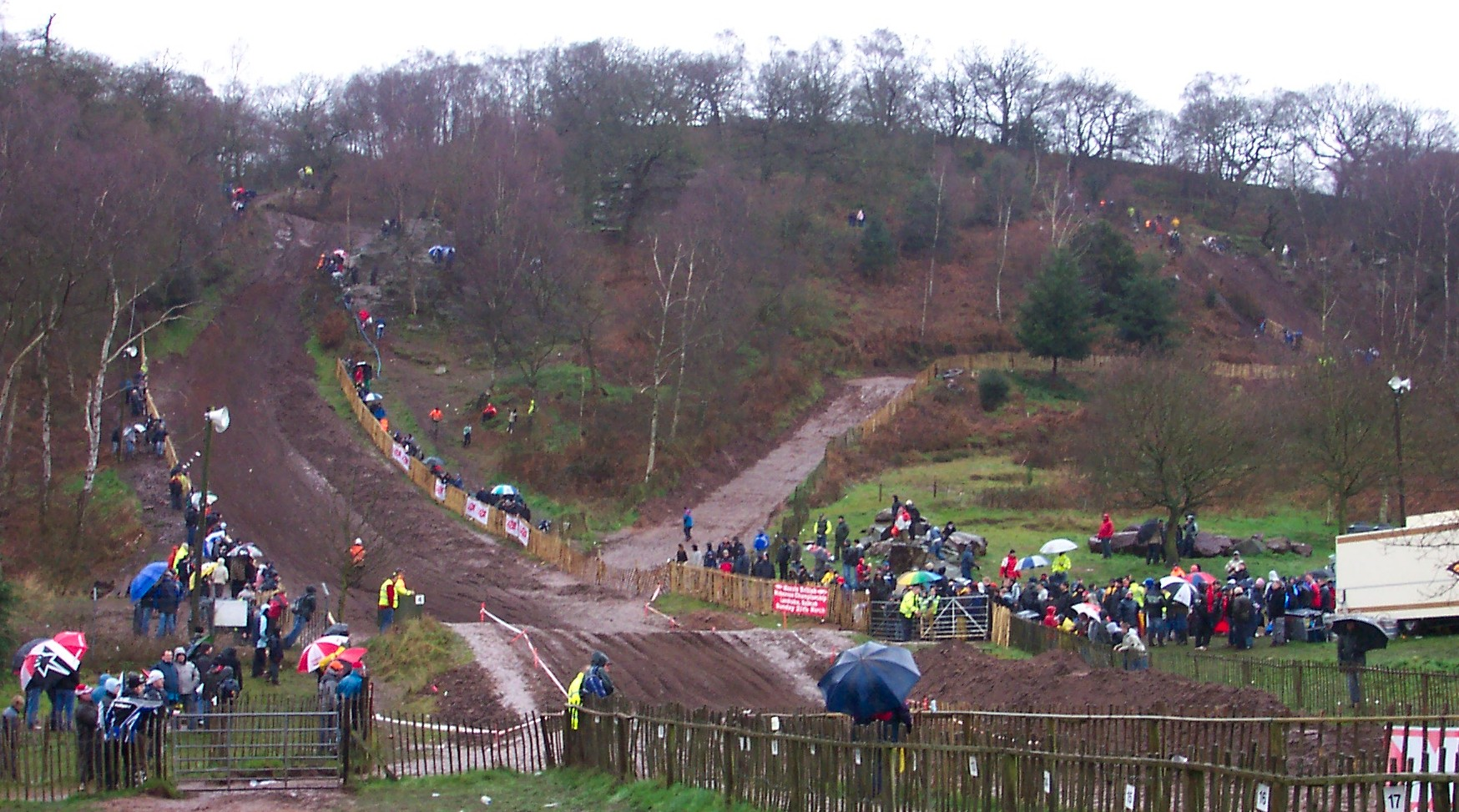
Hawkstone Motocross Circuit

There are a significant number of sporting clubs and facilities in Shropshire, many of which are found in Shrewsbury and Telford in addition to a number of clubs found locally throughout the county. Shropshire is home to a variety of established amateur, semi-pro and professional sports clubs.

The county is home to one of five National Sports Centres. Situated at Lilleshall Hall just outside Newport in Lilleshall, this is where the 1966 England National football team trained for two weeks prior to their success in the World Cup of 1966.

=== Football ===
The three highest football (and only professional) clubs in the county are Shrewsbury Town (EFL League Two), A.F.C. Telford United (Southern League Premier Division Central) and The New Saints (Welsh Premier League) in Oswestry.

There are numerous semi-professional football clubs in the lower leagues. Along with this, in the lower tiers, Salopian clubs use the unofficial derby name 'El Shropico' when playing teams from the county, first used for a game between Market Drayton Town and Shawbury United in August 2016, who started the El Shropico name, which has since been used also by Whitchurch Alport and Shifnal Town. The governing body in the county is the Shropshire Football Association, who organise a number of county-wide cup competitions, including the Shropshire Senior Cup. In 2020 the Shropshire County Football League was created, replacing the Shropshire Premier League. As of the 2025–26 football season the following Shropshire clubs play in these English leagues (the highest team of each club shown only):

Level	League	Clubs
4	League Two	Shrewsbury Town
6	National League North	AFC Telford United
8	Northern Premier League Division One West	Shifnal Town
9	Midland League Premier Division	Whitchurch Alport
10	Midland League Division One	AFC Bridgnorth
10	North West Counties League Division One South	Haughmond, Shawbury United, Market Drayton Town, Allscott Heath FC, Telford Town
11	Shropshire County League Premier Division	Ellesmere Rangers

Also, some clubs situated near the Welsh border play in the Welsh league system:

Level	League	Clubs
1	Cymru Premier	The New Saints
4	Central Wales Football League Northern Division	Bishop's Castle Town

=== Other sports ===
The historic Wenlock Olympian Society Annual Games (begun 1850) are held annually in Much Wenlock during the second weekend in July. A four-day festival, the Games include cricket, volleyball, tennis, bowls, badminton, triathlon, 10k road race, track and field events, archery, five-a-side football, veteran cycle events, clay pigeon shooting and a golf competition.

The county has a number of private and public golf courses, including the Church Stretton Golf Club, situated on the slopes of the Long Mynd. It is the oldest 18-hole golf course in Shropshire, opened in 1898, and one of the highest in the United Kingdom. There is one notable horse racing racecourse in Shropshire, near Ludlow, the Ludlow Racecourse.

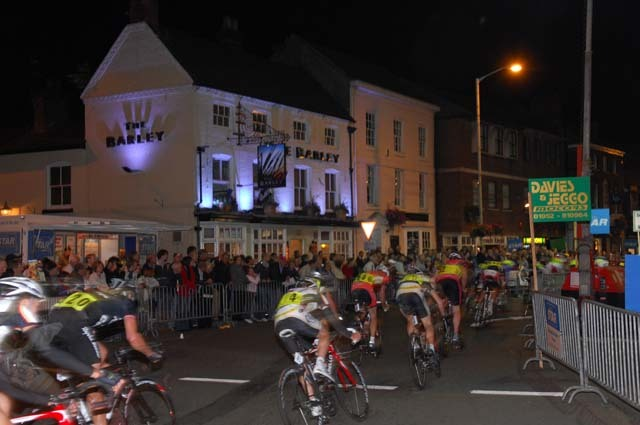
Shropshire Star Newport Nocturne bike race 2006

The area also has a rich motorsports heritage, with the Loton Park Hillclimb and Hawkstone Park Motocross Circuit situated near Shrewsbury. Shrewsbury Motocross Club has staged motocross events in the area for over 30 years. There is additionally an ice hockey club in the county, the Telford Tigers.

One of the biggest one-day events in Shropshire and the biggest one-day cycle race in the UK is the Shropshire Star Newport Nocturne, founded 1970; held every four years, it is Britain's only floodlit cycle race.

The county has one American football team, Shropshire Revolution, which was founded in 2006, and is a club in the British American Football League. Former teams in the county have included the Wrekin Giants, which ran from 1985 to 1989 and the Shropshire Giants which ran in 1989. Shropshire has a number of rugby clubs, including Newport (Salop) Rugby Union Football Club, and Bridgnorth Rugby Football Club, the highest-levelled teams in the county, both playing in the Regional 1 Midlands league.

== See also ==
- 7603 Salopia – an asteroid named after the county
- 53rd Regiment of Foot – former British Army regiment
- Diocese of Shrewsbury – Roman Catholic diocese which covers all of Shropshire
- Healthcare in Shropshire
- List of English and Welsh endowed schools (19th century)#Shropshire
- Shropshire Archives – collects and makes accessible archives and books relating to the county
- Shropshire Blue cheese
