= 2026–27 North West Counties Football League =

The 2026–27 North West Counties Football League season is the 45th in the history of the North West Counties Football League, a football competition in England.

The league comprised three divisions: the Premier Division (at level 9 of the English football league system, Step 5 National League System) and two regional divisions at level 10 or Step 6. The latter were designated the First Division North and First Division South, with the champions of each division competing in a single match for the First Division Champions Cup. Additionally, there were two cup competitions: the League Challenge Cup (known as the Macron Challenge Cup for sponsorship reasons), a knockout competition open to all the league's clubs; and the First Division Trophy (known as the Edward Case Cup, named after the trophy), a knockout trophy competition for First Division clubs only.

== Premier Division ==
North West Counties Football League Premier Division
- Season: 2026–27
- Teams: 20

Seven clubs had left the division after the previous season:

- Cheadle Town, transferred laterally to the Midland League Premier Division
- City of Liverpool, resigned from the league owing to lack of a ground
- Padiham, promoted as promotion play-off winners to the Northern Premier League Division One West
- Pilkington, resigned from the league (discontinued their first team)
- Stockport Town, resigned from the league owing to sustainability considerations
- West Didsbury & Chorlton, transferred laterally to the Midland League Premier Division
- Wythenshawe, promoted as champions to the Northern Premier League Division One West

The 2026–27 Premier Division club allocations from the FA Leagues Committee (subject to appeal) were announced on 15 May 2026. Subsequent to this Pilkington announced their resignation which reprieved Litherland REMYCA from relegation; the revised constitution of the division was adopted at the league's AGM on 20 June 2026. The division comprises 20 clubs, 17 remaining from the previous season plus 3 additions:

- Droylsden, promoted as promotion play-off winners from the First Division North
- Nelson, promoted as champions from the First Division North
- Trafford, relegated from Northern Premier League Division One West

=== League table ===
Pos	Team	Pld	W	D	L	GF	GA	GD	Pts	Promotion, qualification or relegation
1	Droylsden	17	13	2	2	42	15	+27	41	Promotion to the Northern Premier League
2	Nelson	15	12	0	3	43	19	+24	36	Qualification for the promotion play-offs
3	Trafford	15	11	1	3	35	17	+18	34	Qualification for the promotion play-offs
4	Burscough	15	10	3	2	47	22	+25	33	Qualification for the promotion play-offs
5	Irlam	15	10	2	3	32	14	+18	32	Qualification for the promotion play-offs
6	Barnoldswick Town	16	8	4	4	33	19	+14	28	
7	Atherton Laburnum Rovers	15	8	3	4	35	24	+11	27	
8	Chadderton	16	8	2	6	32	21	+11	26	
9	Prestwich Heys	14	7	3	4	22	15	+7	24	
10	South Liverpool	16	7	2	7	36	31	+5	23	
11	Charnock Richard	15	6	4	5	19	17	+2	22	
12	Glossop North End	16	6	3	7	29	28	+1	21	
13	FC Isle of Man	15	6	3	6	25	28	−3	21	
14	Ramsbottom United	15	4	5	6	20	21	−1	17	
15	FC St Helens	14	5	2	7	24	27	−3	17	
16	Longridge Town	16	4	1	11	29	54	−25	13	
17	Euxton Villa	16	3	3	10	21	33	−12	12	
18	Litherland REMYCA	15	2	3	10	13	30	−17	9	
19	AFC Liverpool	18	1	2	15	14	61	−47	5	Relegation to the First Division,, North or South
20	Abbey Hey	18	0	2	16	20	75	−55	2	Relegation to the First Division,, North or South

Updated to match(es) played on 21 November 2026. Source: NWCFL Tables, Non League Matters
Rules for classification: 1) points; 2) goal difference; 3) number of goals scored; 4) number of matches won; 5) head-to-head results

=== Results table ===
Home \ Away	ABB	ALV	ALR	BAR	BUR	CHA	CHR	DRO	EUX	FSH	GNE	IOM	IRL	LIT	LON	NEL	PRE	RAM	SLV	TRA
Abbey Hey				2–2			0–2		1–2			0–6	1–2				1–1		0–1	0–3
AFC Liverpool	2–1					0–3	0–1					1–5			1–2					3–3
Atherton Lab. R.	9–2	3–0				4–3								2–0	3–2	1–2		2–1		1–3
Barnoldswick T.	5–2	3–0			3–2					0–0		7–0		4–2				1–1		1–2
Burscough	6–3	7–0	1–1			3–2		1–2	3–1		3–2			1–1			4–1			
Chadderton	6–2		2–2	3–0						4–1				3–1		2–1	0–2	1–2	1–0	
Charnock Rich.		3–0	2–2	0–1		1–1				3–1				2–1		0–2		1–1	0–3	
Droylsden	2–0	1–0		2–0					4–2		3–1	1–1	1–1		6–1		3–0		4–2	
Euxton Villa		3–0		1–4		1–0		0–3		0–1	3–4				1–2	2–3				
FC St Helens					2–5	0–1							1–0						4–0	2–3
Glossop N. E.		3–3	3–0			1–0		2–1	2–0			0–0	0–3					1–1	2–3	
FC Isle of Man			0–2		1–1		2–1			2–0					1–5			3–2	0–2	
Irlam		7–0	1–3	0–1			2–0				3–1				4–2			2–0		
Litherland R.		2–0			0–3		0–2	0–2	0–0	2–4		1–4	1–2					1–1		
Longridge T.	6–1				2–5			1–5	2–2	0–5	1–7					2–3	0–3			
Nelson	5–2	6–1						3–1				4–0	1–2				3–2			1–0
Prestwich Heys			2–0	1–1			1–1		1–0	5–1	2–0									
Ramsbottom U.		4–1						0–1		2–2			1–2			0–3	1–0			3–0
South Liverpool	10–0	4–2							3–3				1–1	0–1	4–1	2–5	0–1			
Trafford	5–2			1–0	1–2						2–0	1–0			3–0	2–1			6–1	

Updated to match(es) played on 21 November 2026. Source: NWCFL League Results Grid
Legend: Blue = home team win; Yellow = draw; Red = away team win.

=== Stadia and locations ===
2026–27 Premier Division: Location of FC isle of Man
Locations of the 2026–27 North West Counties Football League Premier Division teams
2026–27 Premier Division: Location of clubs (excludes FC Isle of Man)

2026–27 Premier Division: Location of clubs (Lancashire)
2026–27 Premier Division: Location of clubs (Merseyside)

2026–27 Premier Division: Location of clubs (Greater Manchester)

Club	Location	Home ground
Abbey Hey	Gorton, Manchester	Abbey Stadium
AFC Liverpool	Bootle	Berry Street Garage Stadium (groundshare with Bootle)
Atherton Laburnum Rovers	Atherton	Crilly Park
Barnoldswick Town	Barnoldswick	Silentnight Stadium
Burscough	Burscough	The Community Ground
Chadderton	Chadderton, Oldham	Emplas Commercial North Stadium
Charnock Richard	Charnock Richard, Chorley	Mossie Park
Droylsden	Droylsden	Butcher's Arms Ground
Euxton Villa	Euxton	Jim Fowler Memorial Ground
FC Isle of Man	(Isle of Man) Douglas	The Bowl
FC St Helens	St Helens	The Kay Welding Stadium
Glossop North End	Glossop	The Asgard Engineering Stadium
Irlam	Irlam, Salford	The Silver Street Stadium
Litherland REMYCA	Litherland	Litherland Sports Park
Longridge Town	Longridge	Two10 Investment Services Ground
Nelson	Nelson	The Daisy Arena
Prestwich Heys	Prestwich, Bury	Adie Moran Park
Ramsbottom United	Ramsbottom	The Harry Williams Riverside Stadium
South Liverpool	Liverpool	Jericho Lane
Trafford	Flixton	Shawe View

== First Division North ==
North West Counties Football League First Division North
- Season: 2026–27
- Teams: 22

Two clubs had left the division after the previous season:

- Nelson, promoted as champions to the Premier Division
- Droylsden, promoted as promotion play-off winners to the Premier Division

The 2026–27 First Division North club allocations from the FA Leagues Committee (subject to appeal) were announced on 15 May 2026. Subsequent to this announcement, Litherland REMYCA were reprieved from relegation into the division, while Maine Road were reprieved from relegation out of it; the revised constitution of the division was adopted at the league's AGM on 20 June 2026. The division comprises 22 clubs, 16 remaining from the previous season plus 6 additions:

- AFC Knowsley, promoted from fourth in the West Cheshire League
- Ashville, transferred laterally from the First Division South
- Cammell Laird 1907, transferred laterally from the First Division South
- Flixton, a reformed club who had resigned from the Premier Division after the 2011–12 season
- Halewood Apollo, promoted from fifth in the Liverpool County Premier League
- Uppermill, promoted as runners-up from the Manchester Football League

MSB Woolton were renamed Woolton, dropping the name of club sponsor, MSB solicitors, from their title.

=== League table ===
Pos	Team	Pld	W	D	L	GF	GA	GD	Pts	Promotion, qualification or relegation
1	Maghull	18	14	1	3	42	15	+27	43	Promotion to the Premier Division
2	Cammell Laird 1907	20	12	3	5	38	34	+4	39	Qualification for the promotion play-offs
3	Colne	19	9	7	3	38	22	+16	34	Qualification for the promotion play-offs
4	Thornton Cleveleys	17	10	4	3	44	29	+15	34	Qualification for the promotion play-offs
5	Flixton	17	9	6	2	47	24	+23	33	Qualification for the promotion play-offs
6	Halewood Apollo	18	10	2	6	36	29	+7	32	
7	Ashville	19	9	5	5	34	32	+2	32	
8	Fulwood Amateurs	17	9	4	4	39	26	+13	31	
9	Darwen	18	8	6	4	39	41	−2	30	
10	Woolton	17	8	4	5	26	29	−3	28	
11	Daisy Hill	21	7	5	9	25	25	0	26	
12	Ashton Town	20	8	1	11	43	34	+9	25	
13	Bacup Borough	18	6	6	6	28	23	+5	24	
14	Holker Old Boys	17	6	4	7	31	36	−5	22	
15	Ashton Athletic	18	6	2	10	30	38	−8	20	
16	Maine Road	19	4	7	8	27	33	−6	19	
17	Steeton	20	5	4	11	39	47	−8	19	
18	Squires Gate	18	5	4	9	26	37	−11	19	
19	Garstang	19	5	3	11	23	41	−18	18	
20	AFC Knowsley	20	4	4	12	29	50	−21	16	Relegation to a feeder league
21	AFC Blackpool	20	4	2	14	29	42	−13	14	Relegation to a feeder league
22	Uppermill	18	2	4	12	12	38	−26	10	Relegation to a feeder league

Updated to match(es) played on 21 November 2026. Source: NWCFL Tables, Non League Matters
Rules for classification: 1) points; 2) goal difference; 3) number of goals scored; 4) number of matches won; 5) head-to-head results

=== Results table ===
Home \ Away	ABL	AKN	ASA	AST	ASV	BAC	CAM	COL	DAI	DAR	FLI	FUL	GAR	HAL	HOL	MAG	MAI	SQU	STE	THO	UPP	WOO
AFC Blackpool							1–1	1–1					0–2	2–1	1–2				5–3	2–3		
AFC Knowsley				4–2	2–4		0–2						1–2	2–5		0–3		4–0	1–1			
Ashton Athletic	2–0	2–2					1–2		2–0		1–3			2–3	3–0		1–0			1–2	3–0	
Ashton Town	4–0				2–3		4–0		0–0	6–2		1–2	5–0	1–2		0–3				2–3	2–0	
Ashville	1–0		1–0	2–1					1–1		2–4	1–4		1–2		0–1			4–3	4–4	1–1	
Bacup Borough	2–1	1–1		3–0	1–1		2–2	1–1	0–1			1–2	4–1									1–2
Cammell Laird 1907	4–3	3–0							2–1			3–2	0–0		2–1		2–1	2–0	0–2		2–1	
Colne	3–2		4–2	3–1		1–0	4–1			6–0					1–1		1–3				3–0	1–3
Daisy Hill	1–0	2–1				0–2		0–1								2–0	0–1	3–0	5–0		1–1	1–2
Darwen	3–2	3–3			1–2		1–3		2–2				3–2	4–1		2–1			1–1			1–1
Flixton	3–1	4–0	6–2		2–2		3–4	0–0						5–2					3–1	3–4		
Fulwood Amateurs		1–2	5–2		1–0			2–2	3–0	3–3					4–4							1–0
Garstang		3–0						1–1	0–1		1–3	1–5		1–3		0–3		0–3	2–1		3–0	
Halewood Apollo						1–0	4–1					3–1					2–1	1–2				
Holker Old Boys	2–3	4–3		3–0		1–3		2–2	4–2					1–1			1–4			2–0		
Maghull	1–0	3–2	4–1					2–1			1–1	2–0			4–1		5–1	4–0				
Maine Road	2–1			0–3	1–2	2–3				1–2	2–2	1–1	3–3	0–0					2–2			1–1
Squires Gate			2–3					0–2	2–1	2–2	1–1	0–2			3–0				0–4	2–2	1–2	5–1
Steeton			4–2	1–3		4–2			1–1	3–4					0–2	2–3					5–1	1–2
Thornton Cleveleys		5–0				2–2	3–2			1–2			2–1	2–4		1–0	1–1		4–0			
Uppermill	1–4	0–1		0–4		0–0				1–3	0–0			2–1		1–2						
Woolton			0–0	3–2	1–2						0–4		3–0	1–0				3–3		1–5	2–1	

Updated to match(es) played on 21 November 2026. Source: NWCFL League Results Grid
Legend: Blue = home team win; Yellow = draw; Red = away team win.

=== Stadia and locations ===
2026–27 First Division North: Location of clubs
2026–27 First Division North: Location of clubs (Lancashire)

2026–27 First Division North: Location of clubs (Merseyside)	2026–27 First Division North: Location of clubs (Greater Manchester)

Club	Location	Home ground
AFC Blackpool	Squires Gate, Blackpool	The Mechanics Ground
AFC Knowsley	Knowsley, Merseyside	Lord Derby Pavilion
Ashton Athletic	Ashton-in-Makerfield, Wigan	Brocstedes Park
Ashton Town	Ashton-in-Makerfield, Wigan	The Bartons Group Stadium
Ashville	Wallasey	Ray Parker Stadium
Bacup Borough	Bacup	Brian Boys West View Stadium
Cammell Laird 1907	Rock Ferry	The OWS Engineering Ltd Stadium
Colne	Colne	DM Pies Stadium
Daisy Hill	Westhoughton, Bolton	The Ginge Power Stadium
Darwen	Darwen	Multevo Group Anchor Ground
Flixton	Flixton	Valley Road Stadium
Fulwood Amateurs	Fulwood	Lightfoot Green Lane
Garstang	Garstang	The Riverside
Halewood Apollo	Halewood, Merseyside	Volair Halewood
Holker Old Boys	Barrow-in-Furness	The Handmark Engineering Stadium
Maghull	Maghull	DT Hughes Community Stadium
Maine Road	Chorlton-cum-Hardy, Manchester	Brantingham Road
Squires Gate	Squires Gate, Blackpool	The Skiddle Community Stadium
Steeton	Keighley	Marley Stadium
Thornton Cleveleys	Thornton-Cleveleys	Gamble Road
Uppermill	Mossley, Tameside	Seel Park (groundshare with Mossley)
Woolton	Woolton, Liverpool	Simpsons Sports Ground

== First Division South ==
North West Counties Football League First Division South
- Season: 2026–27
- Teams: 20

Five clubs had left the division after the previous season:

- Ashville, transferred laterally to the First Division North
- Cammell Laird 1907, transferred laterally to the First Division North
- Haughmond, relegated to the Shropshire County League
- Runcorn Town, promoted as champions to the Midland League Premier Division
- Stockport Georgians, promoted as promotion play-off winners to the Midland League Premier Division

The 2026–27 First Division South club allocations from the FA Leagues Committee (subject to appeal) were announced on 15 May 2026 and adopted at the league's AGM on 20 June 2026. The division comprises 20 clubs, 13 remaining from the previous season plus 7 additions:

- AFC Bridgnorth, transferred laterally from the Midland League Division One
- Bilston Town, transferred laterally from the Midland League Division One
- Brereton Social, promoted as champions of the Staffordshire County Senior League
- Crewe, promoted from fifth in the Cheshire Football League
- Dawley Town, promoted as champions of the Shropshire County Football League
- Wednesfield Community, transferred laterally from the Midland League Division One
- Widnes Town, a newly founded club

=== League table ===
Pos	Team	Pld	W	D	L	GF	GA	GD	Pts	Promotion, qualification or relegation
1	Sandbach United	17	12	1	4	47	22	+25	37	Promotion to the Premier Division
2	Wolverhampton Casuals	14	11	1	2	31	11	+20	34	Qualification for the promotion play-offs
3	AFC Bridgnorth	15	10	3	2	39	19	+20	33	Qualification for the promotion play-offs
4	Stafford Town	17	9	5	3	39	24	+15	32	Qualification for the promotion play-offs
5	Eccleshall	15	10	1	4	41	17	+24	31	Qualification for the promotion play-offs
6	Bilston Town	15	9	3	3	35	15	+20	30	
7	Allscott Heath	16	8	2	6	46	26	+20	26	
8	Barnton	13	7	4	2	29	18	+11	25	
9	Dawley Town	17	7	4	6	35	32	+3	25	
10	New Mills	16	6	3	7	33	31	+2	21	
11	Brereton Social	17	5	6	6	21	21	0	21	
12	Shawbury United	17	6	2	9	22	35	−13	20	
13	Cheadle Heath Nomads	19	4	7	8	26	34	−8	19	
14	Crewe	16	6	0	10	18	32	−14	18	
15	Market Drayton Town	17	5	2	10	17	30	−13	17	
16	Wednesfield Community	17	4	4	9	22	46	−24	16	
17	Foley Meir	16	4	3	9	18	31	−13	15	
18	Alsager Town	15	3	2	10	21	35	−14	11	Relegation to a feeder league
19	Telford Town	16	2	4	10	13	43	−30	10	Relegation to a feeder league
20	Widnes Town	15	1	5	9	15	46	−31	8	Relegation to a feeder league

Updated to match(es) played on 21 November 2026. Source: NWCFL Tables, Non League Matters
Rules for classification: 1) points; 2) goal difference; 3) number of goals scored; 4) number of matches won; 5) head-to-head results

=== Results table ===
Home \ Away	ABR	ALL	ALS	BAR	BIL	BRE	CHN	CRE	DAW	ECC	FOL	MDR	NEW	SAN	SHA	STA	TEL	WED	WID	WOL
AFC Bridgnorth								4–1			3–1	2–0	3–2	2–1	4–0	4–1		3–1		
Allscott Heath			4–1			3–2	2–2		3–1	0–4	6–0	1–2			3–4			4–0	7–0	
Alsager Town	2–3					0–2		0–1	2–2						0–1	2–3			0–0	
Barnton	3–3						1–0	2–3	3–2		2–2					1–2		4–0		
Bilston Town	0–4		0–1	1–1				2–0	4–0	3–2		3–0			2–0	3–1			7–0	
Brereton Social	1–0				0–3			2–1	2–2					0–1	0–2	1–1		1–1	1–2	
Cheadle Heath N.			1–4		1–1	1–1				0–1		2–0		3–3		3–3	2–0		2–2	0–3
Crewe		1–4					2–1		1–3	1–2	0–3						2–1	0–1	3–1	0–3
Dawley Town						0–0					4–1	3–1		3–1		1–1				0–1
Eccleshall	2–2			1–2					3–2				2–0		5–0			2–3	3–1	
Foley Meir				0–2	1–3	2–1	2–2			0–1		0–1		3–2	0–2				3–0	
Market Drayton T.						0–2	3–2	0–2					0–1	3–4		1–2	1–0		0–0	
New Mills		2–1	2–3	3–3					1–2			1–2			3–2		6–0	5–2		
Sandbach United			6–2		1–0		3–1			2–0			1–3		3–0	1–0		2–1	6–0	4–1
Shawbury United	3–1			1–3			1–2		0–2							1–1			3–2	1–3
Stafford Town		2–1	5–2					3–0			0–0		5–0				3–1	6–2		
Telford Town		0–0	3–2	0–2		2–2	2–0			0–11			1–1	0–6	1–1					0–1
Wednesfield C.	1–1	1–7					0–1		3–2			3–3					3–2		0–0	0–3
Widnes Town						0–3			5–6				2–2							
Wolverhampton C.		4–0	2–0		3–3					1–2	2–0	2–0	2–1							

Updated to match(es) played on 21 November 2026. Source: NWCFL League Results Grid
Legend: Blue = home team win; Yellow = draw; Red = away team win.

=== Stadia and locations ===
2026–27 First Division South: Location of clubs
2026–27 First Division South: Location of clubs (Cheshire)

2026–27 First Division South: Location of clubs (Shropshire)
2026–27 First Division South: Location of clubs (Staffordshire)

Club	Location	Home ground
AFC Bridgnorth	Bridgnorth, Shropshire	Crown Meadow
Allscott Heath	Allscott	The Peter Ford Stadium
Alsager Town	Alsager	Wood Park
Barnton	Barnton	The Creative Hut Stadium
Bilston Town	Bilston, West Midlands	Queen Street Ground
Brereton Social	Brereton, Staffordshire	Red Lion Ground
Cheadle Heath Nomads	Cheadle Heath	Ideal Building Systems Stadium
Crewe	Crewe, Cheshire	The Excel
Dawley Town	Dawley, Telford, Shropshire	Theatre of Jockeys
Eccleshall	Eccleshall	Stoke Signage Stadium
Foley Meir	Stoke-on-Trent	Trentham Foods Stadium
Market Drayton Town	Market Drayton	Balufab Stadium
New Mills	New Mills	Church Lane
Sandbach United	Sandbach	Sandbach Community Football Centre
Shawbury United	Shawbury	Shawbury United Community Sports and Recreation Ground
Stafford Town	Stafford	Evans Park
Telford Town	Telford	Lionheart Security Services Stadium
Wednesfield Community	Wednesfield, Wolverhampton	Cottage Ground
Widnes Town	Widnes, Cheshire	DCBL Stadium
Wolverhampton Casuals	Featherstone	Brinsford Stadium

== League Challenge Cup ==
The 2026–27 NWCFL League Challenge Cup (known for sponsorship reasons as The Macron Cup) was open to all 62 clubs from the Premier and First Divisions North & South (indicated in the results listings below by '(PD)', '(FDN)' and '(FDS)').

For the early rounds clubs were drawn into four regional groupings: Group A the most northern section comprised five Premier Division and ten First Division North clubs and included Darwen who received a first round bye; Group B comprised six Premier Division, eight First Division North and one First Division South clubs and included cup holders AFC Liverpool who received a bye to the next round; Group C comprised nine Premier Division, four First Division North and three First Division South clubs; and Group D, the most southerly group comprised 16 clubs all from the First Division South.

=== First round ===
Tie	Home team (division)	Score	Away team (division)
Group A
1	Bacup Borough (FDN)	3–0	Thornton Cleveleys (FDN)
2	Barnoldswick Town (PD)	3–1	AFC Blackpool (FDN)
3	Charnock Richard (PD)	4–2	Longridge Town (PD)
4	Fulwood Amateurs (FDN)	5–0	Colne (FDN)
5	Holker Old Boys (FDN)	3–0	Garstang (FDN)
6	Squires Gate (FDN)	2–4	Euxton Villa (PD)
7	Steeton (FDN)	1–4	Nelson (PD)
Darwen (FDN) received a bye to the next round
Group B
8	Burscough (PD)	1–0	Cammell Laird 1907 (FDN)
9	FC Isle of Man (PD)	6–0	Widnes Town (FDS)
10	Halewood Apollo (FDN)	3–0	Ashton Town (FDN)
11	Litherland REMYCA (PD)	3–1	Ashton Athletic (FDN)
12	Maghull (FDN)	4–0	AFC Knowsley (FDN)
13	South Liverpool (PD)	1–4	FC St Helens (PD)
14	Woolton (FDN)	2–1	Ashville (FDN)
AFC Liverpool (PD) received a bye to the next round
Group C
15	Abbey Hey (PD)	2–5	Atherton Laburnum Rovers (PD)
16	Daisy Hill (FDN)	1–2	Barnton (FDS)
17	Droylsden (PD)	0–2	Chadderton (PD)
18	Flixton (FDN)	4–0	Uppermill (FDN)
19	Irlam (PD)	1–0	Glossop North End (PD)
20	New Mills (FDS)	5–0	Maine Road (FDN)
21	Prestwich Heys (PD)	2–1	Trafford (PD)
22	Ramsbottom United (PD)	4–0	Cheadle Heath Nomads (FDS)
22	Played at Cheadle Heath Nomads		
Group D
23	Crewe (FDS)	6–0	Brereton Social (FDS)
24	Eccleshall (FDS)	4–2	Shawbury United (FDS)
25	Foley Meir (FDS)	1–1 (3–4 p)	Wolverhampton Casuals (FDS)
26	Market Drayton Town (FDS)	1–3	Allscott Heath (FDS)
27	Sandbach United (FDS)	0–0 (2–4 p)	Alsager Town (FDS)
28	Stafford Town (FDS)	0–2	Bilston Town (FDS)
29	Telford Town (FDS)	1–1 (6–5 p)	AFC Bridgnorth (FDS)
30	Wednesfield Community (FDS)	1–1 (4–2 p)	Dawley Town (FDS)

=== Second round ===
Tie	Home team (division)	Score	Away team (division)
Group A
1	Bacup Borough (FDN)	0–5	Charnock Richard (PD)
2	Barnoldswick Town (PD)	3–0	Darwen (FDN)
3	Fulwood Amateurs (FDN)	4–1	Euxton Villa (PD)
4	Holker Old Boys (FDN)	2–5	Nelson (PD)
Group B
5	AFC Liverpool (PD)	1–2	FC St Helens (PD)
6	Burscough (PD)	8–1	Halewood Apollo (FDN)
7	FC Isle of Man (PD)	3–2	Maghull (FDN)
8	Woolton (FDN)	0–2	Litherland REMYCA (PD)
Group C
9	Flixton (FDN)	4–2	Atherton Laburnum Rovers (PD)
10	Irlam (PD)	1–3	Barnton (FDS)
11	Prestwich Heys (PD)	3–2	New Mills (FDS)
12	Ramsbottom United (PD)	3–1	Chadderton (PD)
12	Played at Chadderton		
Group D
13	Alsager Town (FDS)	1–1 (3–4 p)	Bilston Town (FDS)
14	Telford Town (FDS)	0–5	Allscott Heath (FDS)
15	Wednesfield Community (FDS)	1–4	Eccleshall (FDS)
16	Wolverhampton Casuals (FDS)	3–2	Crewe (FDS)

=== Third round ===
From this round the draw was no longer regionalised but an open draw

Tie	Home team (division)	Score	Away team (division)
1	Barnoldswick Town (PD)	v	Ramsbottom United (PD)
2	Bilston Town (FDS)	2–3	Charnock Richard (PD)
3	Burscough (PD)	1–1 (4–2 p)	Fulwood Amateurs (FDN)
4	Eccleshall (FDS)	1–0	Allscott Heath (FDS)
5	FC Isle of Man (PD)	2–2 (2–4 p)	Barnton (FDS)
6	FC St Helens (PD)	0–0 (3–2 p)	Wolverhampton Casuals (FDS)
7	Flixton (FDN)	1–1 (2–4 p)	Nelson (PD)
8	Litherland REMYCA (PD)	0–2	Prestwich Heys (PD)

=== Quarter-finals ===
Tie	Home team (division)	Score	Away team (division)
1	Burscough (PD)	v	Prestwich Heys (PD)
2	Charnock Richard (PD)	v	FC St Helens (PD)
3	Eccleshall (FDS)	v	winner of Third round match 1
4	Nelson (PD)	v	Barnton (FDS)

Updated to match(es) played on 21 November 2026

Source: NWCFL:Macron Cup Results

== First Division Cup ==
The 2026–27 NWCFL First Division Cup (known as The Edward Case Cup, the name of the trophy) was open to all 42 clubs from the First Divisions North and South.

Until the second round the clubs were divided into North and South groups (per the divisions), after which the draw became open. The competition commenced with a preliminary round for twenty clubs (12 North and 8 South First Division clubs) which comprised from each section's corresponding division a combination of both clubs new to the league and those with the lowest league positions from the 2025–26 season.

=== Preliminary round ===
Tie	Home team	Score	Away team
North Group
1	Flixton	4–0	Ashton Athletic
2	Fulwood Amateurs	8–2	Halewood Apollo
3	Garstang	0–3	Colne
4	Maine Road	4–0	AFC Blackpool
5	Steeton	3–1	AFC Knowsley
6	Uppermill	1–1 (4–3 p)	Daisy Hill
South Group
7	AFC Bridgnorth	2–2 (4–1 p)	Bilston Town
8	Dawley Town	2–3	Brereton Social
9	Market Drayton Town	3–0	Crewe
10	Wednesfield Community	1–1 (5–4 p)	Widnes Town

=== First round ===
Tie	Home team	Score	Away team
North Group
1	Bacup Borough	3–0	Ashville
2	Flixton	5–3	Darwen
3	Fulwood Amateurs	1–1 (4–3 p)	Ashton Town
4	Maghull	0–0 (1–3 p)	Cammell Laird 1907
5	Maine Road	1–4	Holker Old Boys
6	Squires Gate	1–3	Steeton
7	Uppermill	1–5	Thornton Cleveleys
8	Woolton	3–3 (4–1 p)	Colne
South Group
9	Barnton	6–0	Eccleshall
10	Brereton Social	0–1	AFC Bridgnorth
11	Cheadle Heath Nomads	1–2	Wolverhampton Casuals
12	Market Drayton Town	2–3	Alsager Town
13	Sandbach United	4–1	Foley Meir
14	Stafford Town	2–1	Allscott Heath
15	Telford Town	0–4	Shawbury United
16	Wednesfield Community	3–3 (2–4 p)	New Mills

=== Second round ===
Tie	Home team	Score	Away team
North Group
1	Flixton	2–0	Bacup Borough
2	Steeton	3–3 (4–2 p)	Holker Old Boys
3	Thornton Cleveleys	2–3	Fulwood Amateurs
4	Woolton	3–1	Cammell Laird 1907
South Group
5	AFC Bridgnorth	1–2	Alsager Town
6	Barnton	2–0	Shawbury United
6	Played at Shawbury United		
7	New Mills	1–7	Sandbach United
8	Wolverhampton Casuals	3–0	Stafford Town

=== Third round ===
From this round the draw was no longer regionalised. In the listings below First Division North clubs are indicated as '(N)' and First Division South clubs as '(S)'.

Tie	Home team (division)	Score	Away team (division)
5	Alsager Town (S)	v	Sandbach United (S)
6	Barnton (S)	v	Steeton (N)
3	Fulwood Amateurs (N)	v	Flixton (N)
8	Wolverhampton Casuals (S)	v	Woolton (N)

Updated to match(es) played on 14 November 2026

Source: NWCFL: Edward Case Cup Results
