= List of football clubs in Shropshire =

This is a list of football teams based in the English county of Shropshire sorted by which domestic league they currently compete in. The leagues are listed in order of their level in the English football league system. The list only features teams from the 1st to the 10th tier of the system, as well as some teams competing in the Welsh football league system.

Locations of all the football clubs in Shropshire from tiers 1–10. Teams that compete in the English Football League are in bold text.

== Levels 1–4 ==
These clubs compete in fully professional leagues, comprising levels 1–4 of the English football league system: the Premier League and the English Football League.

Club	Home Ground	Location	League	Level
Shrewsbury Town	New Meadow	Shrewsbury	EFL League Two	4

== Levels 5–10 ==
These clubs compete in semi-professional leagues, comprising levels 5–10 of the English football league system: the National League downwards.

Club	Home Ground	Location	League	Level
AFC Bridgnorth	Crown Meadow	Bridgnorth	Midland League Division One	10
AFC Telford United	New Bucks Head	Wellington	National League North	6
Allscott Heath	Allscott Sports & Social Club	Allscott	North West Counties League Division One South	10
Haughmond	Shrewsbury Sports Village	Shrewsbury	North West Counties League Division One South	10
Market Drayton Town	Greenfields Sports Ground	Market Drayton	North West Counties League Division One South	10
Shawbury United	New Meadow Community 4G	Shrewsbury (Note: Although the club represent the village of Shawbury, they currently play their home games in Shrewsbury. The club has been granted planning permission to build a new ground back in Shawbury, off the A53, and aim to begin playing there by 2022-23.)	North West Counties League Division One South	10
Shifnal Town	Phoenix Park	Shifnal	Northern Premier League Division One West	8
Whitchurch Alport	Yockings Park	Whitchurch	Midland League Premier Division	9

== Other national leagues ==
These clubs are based in Shropshire, but compete in the Welsh football league system.

Club	Home Ground	Location	League	Level
Bishops Castle Town	The Manor	Bishop's Castle	Central Wales Northern Division (Note: Despite playing in England, Bishops Castle Town compete in the Welsh football league system.)	(Wales) 4
The New Saints	Park Hall	Oswestry	Cymru Premier (Note: Despite playing in England, The New Saints compete in the Welsh football league system as they represent, as well as Oswestry, the village of Llansantffraid-ym-Mechain in Powys.)	(Wales) 1
