= Mason Springthorpe =

English footballer

Personal information
- Full name: Mason Thomas Springthorpe
- Date of birth: 1 November 1994 (age 32)
- Place of birth: Shrewsbury, England
- Position: Goalkeeper

Team information
- Current team: Wem Town

Youth career
- −2011: Shrewsbury Town

Senior career*
Years	Team	Apps	(Gls)
2011–2014	Everton	0	(0)
2014	→ Woking (loan)	2	(0)
2014	Ellesmere Rangers	27	(0)
2015	Fleetwood Town	0	(0)
2015	A.F.C. Telford United	4	(0)
2015–2016	→ Northwich Victoria (loan)		
2015–2016	Northwich Victoria		
2016–2017	Southport	1	(0)
2017	Alfreton Town	7	(0)
2017	→ Sutton Coldfield Town (loan)	15	(0)
2018	A.F.C. Wulfrunians		
2018–2019	Market Drayton Town		
2019–2020	F.C. Oswestry Town		
2020–2021	Shrewsbury Up & Comers		
2021	Whitchurch Alport		
2021–	Wem Town		
- * Club domestic league appearances and goals as of 12 August 2023 (UTC)

Mason Thomas Springthorpe (born 1 November 1994) is an English footballer who plays for Shropshire County League Premier Division club Wem Town as a goalkeeper.

He joined Everton for £125,000 from Shrewsbury Town in February 2011 but never played a competitive match, spending a month on loan at Woking in January 2014. After being released that May, he had a brief stint at Ellesmere Rangers before returning to the professional game by signing for Fleetwood Town in January 2015, being released at the end of the season. He went on to play for a series of non-league clubs.

== Early life ==
Born in Shrewsbury, Springthorpe played as a forward as a child, but at the age of nine his father converted him to be a goalkeeper. He attended Meole Brace School.

As a youth, Springthorpe studied the style of play of Joe Hart, another goalkeeper from Shrewsbury who left his local team when he was signed by a top-flight club, in Hart's case Manchester City.

== Career ==
=== Everton ===
On 14 February 2011, when still in Shrewsbury Town's youth team, he was signed by Premier League club Everton for £125,000. He told BBC Radio Shropshire "The price tag means nothing to me. The regime at Everton will be something else, but if that's what it takes to get to the next level then I'll grab it with both hands". He believed that Everton would progress his career, due to the contracts they had given to young players Jose Baxter and Jack Rodwell.

He was first included in an Everton matchday squad on 2 March 2013, remaining an unused substitute as they defeated reigning Reading 2–1 at Goodison Park. Tim Howard was injured, so Springthorpe deputised for Ján Mucha. A week later he was again on the bench as they lost 0–3 at home to Wigan Athletic in the sixth round of the FA Cup. On 16 March, his last call-up of the season, he was an unused substitute in a 2–0 home win over reigning league champions Manchester City.

After his first season, Springthorpe toured the United States with Everton. He was only in one matchday squad in the following season, a 2–1 home win over Southampton on 29 December.

On 20 January 2014, he was loaned to Conference National team Woking for a month. He made his competitive debut the following day, in a 0–1 defeat to Chester. On 25 January he played the only other game of his loan, a 2–2 draw with Lincoln City at Sincil Bank. In May 2014, Springthorpe, who had been a regular for Everton's Under-21 team, was released by manager Roberto Martínez.

=== Ellesmere and Fleetwood ===
On 6 August, Springthorpe returned to his native Shropshire, signing for West Midlands League club Ellesmere Rangers on the day before the start of their season.

He returned to the professional game on 3 January 2015, when he was signed for League One club Fleetwood Town by manager Graham Alexander. On the same day, he was an unused substitute for their 2–2 draw against Swindon Town at Highbury Stadium. On 7 May, having not made an appearance, Springthorpe was one of 14 players released by the Lancashire club.

=== Return to non-league ===
Springthorpe then returned again to his home county, signing a one-year deal at Conference North club A.F.C. Telford United on. He moved to Northwich Victoria of the Northern Premier League Division One North on loan in September 2015, having not yet featured for his parent club that season. He transferred to them on a permanent basis the following month. On 5 December, he featured for them in the second round of the FA Cup away to League Two Northampton Town, conceding three goals in the final seven minutes of a 3–2 loss.

In November 2016 he joined Southport on dual registration terms, and having made two first-team appearances he was released by the club in March 2017.

In June 2017 he joined Alfreton Town on a one-year contract. In August, he signed for Sutton Coldfield Town on loan, which was extended for a second month in September. He was released by mutual consent by Alfreton in October 2017.

After spells at A.F.C. Wulfrunians and Market Drayton Town, on 27 February 2019, Springthorpe joined North West Counties League Division One South club F.C. Oswestry Town.

After the club went out of business, Springthorpe signed for Shropshire County League side Shrewsbury Up & Comers, whom Springthorpe spent his youth career as a child with.
