= Widnes Town F.C. =

Widnes Town
- Full name: Widnes Town Football Club
- Founded: 18 September 2025
- Ground: Halton Stadium primary The Quickline Logistics Arena temporary
- Capacity: 13,350
- Manager: Gary Taylor-Fletcher
- League: North West Counties Football League, First Division South

Widnes Town Football Club is a football club based in Widnes, Cheshire, England. The club was formed as an intended phoenix club for Widnes on 18 September 2025 and plays its home matches currently at Rossett Park , Widnes Town were allocated to the North West Counties Football League First Division South for their first season.

== History ==
Widnes withdrew from the Northern Premier League in June 2025 after failing to find a suitable ground, following disputes with Halton Borough Council, the owners of the Halton Stadium. Town secured tenancy at the DCBL Stadium, and were able in February 2026 to apply to join the National League System directly as a phoenix club. They were subsequently placed into the North West Counties Football League First Division South for the 2026-27 season.

Widnes played their first match on 22nd August 2026, a 7-0 defeat to Allscott Heath. After failing to win any of their first five matches across all competitions, original manager Paul McNally resigned and was replaced by Gary Taylor-Fletcher, who described the club as requiring an entirely new squad of players. In November 2026 former Premier League player Emmerson Boyce joined Widnes as first team coach.
