= Widnes F.C. =

Association football club in England

Widnes
- Full name: Widnes Football Club
- Nicknames: The Black & Whites
- Founded: 2003 (as The Dragons A.F.C.)
- Dissolved: 2025
- Ground: Halton Stadium
- Capacity: 13,350
| Home colours | Away colours |

Widnes Football Club was an association football club, based in Widnes, Cheshire, England. They played their home matches at the DCBL Stadium, Widnes. They were affiliated to the Liverpool County Football Association.

On 29 June 2025 the club announced that it had withdrawn from the Northern Premier League, and currently do not field a first team.

On 18 September 2025 a phoenix club called Widnes Town was announced who will play their home matches at the DCBL Stadium.

== History ==
=== 2003–2012: Early years ===
The club was founded in February 2003 as The Dragons A.F.C. by former secretary Bill Morley as a local junior football club. In 2008, the club was awarded the FA Charter Standard Development award for its continuous development of grassroots football.

=== 2012–2018: Back to back promotions ===
In March 2012, Widnes Dragons began a consultation process with Widnes Vikings RLFC to become part of the Vikings Sports Brand, a partnership that was agreed to enhance the club's community status.

On 10 July 2012, at the club's AGM, the club's members unanimously agreed to become a part of the Widnes Sports Group and agreed on a 12-month transitional period up to the end of that current season (2012–13). The next step in the club's progression was made in season 2013–14 when Widnes Vikings FC was admitted into the football pyramid and placed within North West Counties Football League Division One.

In March 2014, the club's committee called an EGM for its members to decide on the future of the club. A unanimous vote was made that the club was to move away from the Vikings brand and to restructure the club to secure its own identity and long-term future. Subsequently, the club parted ways with the Vikings brand and became known as Widnes Football Club, which was symbolic in representing where the team and its fans came from whilst recognising that a new club needed to be built to establish confidence in the local community and support young local talent in Widnes.

In 2016, a change in board structure lead to the appointment of Ian Ross as chairman with a board of directors being established. Danny Meadowcroft and Brian Pritchard were appointed joint managers, replacing previous manager Steve Hill who left the Club following the end of the 2015–16 season. However, following an indifferent start to the season, Meadowcroft and Pritchard left the club and were replaced by Joey Dunn, who was subsequently appointed manager.

The season ended on a highly successful note as under Dunn's management, Widnes were crowned North West Counties Football League Division One Champions with a game to spare after a 5–1 win at AFC Blackpool.

In summer 2017, the club began to re-establish a youth section with the introduction of a development squad and two junior teams at Under 7 and Under 9 age groups.

Despite Dunn's resignation early in the 2017–18 season, the club enjoyed yet another highly successful season. Senior players Steve Akrigg and Kevin Towey were appointed joint player managers, leading the club to promotion to the Northern Premier League and victory in the final of the North West Counties Challenge Cup against Burscough.

=== 2018–2025: Northern Premier League ===
Widnes' first season at Step 4 brought mixed success. Early exits in the FA Cup, FA Trophy and League Cup meant The Whites only had the league to focus on. Joint managers Towey and Akrigg guided Widnes to a solid mid table finish, despite ending the season as one of the league's form sides.

The next two seasons were affected by the turmoil caused by the Coronavirus Pandemic. Widnes finished the abandoned 2019–20 season in 12th, as well as the curtailed 2020–21 season in the same position.

As football returned to normal in the 2021–22 season, Widnes endured a poor start to the season, resulting in the club parting company with Managers Kevin Towey and Steve Akrigg. Former Ashton Town manager David Dempsey was hired, and not only guided Widnes to safety, but turned the side into one of the form teams in the second half of the season, boasting an impressive unbeaten run at home. Dempsey also led his side to the third qualifying round of the FA Trophy, where they were beaten on penalties by Bootle, this being the clubs best run to date. Success under Dempsey was short lived as Widnes began the 2022–23 season in very poor form, failing to win any of their first five league games and seeing their FA Cup run ended by North West Counties side Bury. Subsequently, Widnes and Dempsey went their separate ways. Widnes moved quickly to hire Michael Ellison, who began the season with City of Liverpool. Performances under 'Ello' quickly improved, and Widnes were able to pick up their first league win of the season away to newly promoted Hanley. Despite spending a lot of the season rooted to the bottom of the table, Ellison and Widnes picked up a number of crucial wins towards the tail-end of the season, ultimately finishing in 17th place. Due to Skelmersdale not meeting Northern Premier League ground grading requirements, Widnes received a reprieve in the step 4/5 inter step playoff, thus securing their Northern Premier League Status for the 2023–24 season due to their superior points per game ratio compared to other teams around the country. The 2024–25 season saw the club promoted to step three for the first (and currently only) time as Division One West champions.

=== Withdrawal from League ===
On 29 June 2025, the club announced that it had withdrawn from the Northern Premier League Premier Division.

=== Season-by-season record ===
| Season | Division | P | W | D | L | F | A | Pts | Pos | FA Cup | FA Trophy/FA Vase | Liverpool Senior Cup | Notes |
|---|---|---|---|---|---|---|---|---|---|---|---|---|---|
| 2012–13 | West Cheshire League Division Three | 28 | 15 | 3 | 10 | 76 | 45 | 48 | 4/15 | — | — | — | Promoted |
| 2013–14 | North West Counties League Division One | 36 | 9 | 9 | 16 | 58 | 84 | 35 | 14/19 | — | — | First round | |
| 2014–15 | North West Counties League Division One | 36 | 10 | 5 | 21 | 62 | 101 | 35 | 16/19 | — | Second qualifying round | Quarter-final | |
| 2015–16 | North West Counties League Division One | 34 | 10 | 5 | 19 | 67 | 77 | 35 | 13/18 | — | — | Quarter-final | |
| 2016–17 | North West Counties League Division One | 42 | 30 | 6 | 6 | 117 | 50 | 96 | 1/22 | — | Second qualifying round | Quarter-final | Promoted |
| 2017–18 | North West Counties League Premier Division | 44 | 30 | 6 | 8 | 102 | 52 | 96 | 2/23 | Extra preliminary round | First qualifying round | Semi-final | Promoted |
| 2018–19 | Northern Premier League Division One West | 38 | 15 | 6 | 17 | 60 | 61 | 51 | 12/20 | Extra preliminary round | Extra preliminary round | Semi-final | |
| 2019–20 | Northern Premier League Division One North/West | 31 | 9 | 10 | 12 | 47 | 49 | 37 | 12/20 | First qualifying round | Extra preliminary round | First round | Season Abandoned |
| 2020–21 | Northern Premier League Division One West | 9 | 2 | 2 | 5 | 8 | 15 | 8 | 12/19 | Preliminary round | Second round qualifying | Competition not held | Season Curtailed |
| 2021–22 | Northern Premier League Division One West | 38 | 13 | 8 | 17 | 47 | 46 | 47 | 13/20 | Extra Preliminary Round | Third Round Qualifying | Competition not held | |
| 2022–23 | Northern Premier League Division One West | 38 | 12 | 8 | 18 | 40 | 66 | 44 | 17/20 | Preliminary Round | Second Round Qualifying | First Round | |
| 2023–24 | Northern Premier League Division One West | 38 | 17 | 6 | 15 | 60 | 43 | 57 | 9/20 | First Round Qualifying | First Round Qualifying | Second Round | |
| 2024–25 | Northern Premier League Division One West | 42 | 25 | 10 | 7 | 79 | 38 | 85 | 1/22 | First Round Qualifying | First Round Qualifying | Quarter-final | Promoted |

== Crest and colours ==
The club wore a white home strip.

=== Shirt sponsors and manufacturers ===
| Year | Kit Manufacturer | Main Shirt Sponsor | Back of Shirt Sponsor |
|---|---|---|---|
| 2013–14 | O'Neills | Stobart | Polyblend |
| 2014–2016 | O'Neills | Investec | Tax Architects |
| 2016–18 | Macron | PolyParts.co.uk | None |
| 2018–20 | Macron | Northern Premier League Football Academy | None |
| 2020-24 | Macron | Hallmark Security | None |
| 2024- | Fused Sports | SLL Properties LTD | Sam's Diamonds Cancer Support |

== Stadium ==
Widnes moved into the Halton Stadium in 2012, ahead of their debut season in the West Cheshire League. They played their first home game at the stadium against Chester Nomads Reserves on 1 September 2012. The club's highest attendance at the stadium was 603 set on 2 January 2023 against Macclesfield.

== Managerial history ==
As of 11 March 2025

| Manager | Nationality | Period | Total | | | | |
| Manager | Nationality | Period | G | W | D | L | Win % |
|---|---|---|---|---|---|---|---|
| Paul Pennington | England | 2012 | 7 | 2 | 1 | 4 | 28.57 |
| Steve Hill | England | 2012–2016 | 143 | 46 | 21 | 76 | 32.17 |
| Danny Meadowcroft and Brian Pritchard | England | 2016 | 9 | 5 | 1 | 3 | 55.55 |
| Danny Salt (interim) | England | 2016 | 3 | 1 | 0 | 2 | 33.33 |
| Joey Dunn | England | 2016–2017 | 53 | 36 | 6 | 11 | 67.92 |
| Steve Akrigg and Nick Matthews (interim) | England | 2017 | 1 | 0 | 0 | 1 | 00.00 |
| Steve Akrigg and Kevin Towey | England | 2017–2021 | 147 | 66 | 26 | 55 | 44.90 |
| Michael Burke (interim) | England | 2021 | 1 | 0 | 1 | 0 | 00.00 |
| Dave Dempsey | England | 2021–2022 | 42 | 15 | 11 | 16 | 35.71 |
| Michael Ellison | England | 2022-2025 | 117 | 56 | 21 | 40 | 47.86 |

== Records ==
=== Team records ===
- Record league victory 8 goals:
  - 8-0 v St Helens Town, 8 April 2017
- Record home victory 8 goals:
  - 8-0 v St Helens Town, 8 April 2017
- Record league defeat 9 goals:
  - 10-1 v Northwich Manchester Villa, 13 December 2014
- Record home attendance:
  - 882 vs. Trafford FC Division One West, 26 April 2025 (club record)
- Lowest home attendance:
  - 24 vs. Wigan Robin Park, North West Counties Football League Division One, 18 April 2015
- Longest unbeaten league run:
  - 16 games, 25 November 2017 to 31 March 2018
- Most league games won in a row:
  - 14 games, 4 March 2017 to 12 August 2017
- Most league games lost in a row:
  - 6 games, 14 March 2015 to 18 April 2015
- Most league games without a win:
  - 12 games, 21 September 2019 to 1 January 2020
- Best league performance:
  - 1st Northern Premier League Division One West 2024–25
- Best FA Cup performance:
  - First round qualifying 2019–20, 2023–24 and 2025–26
- Best FA Trophy performance:
  - Third round qualifying 2021–22 and 2025–26
- Best FA Vase performance:
  - Second round qualifying 2014–15
- Best Liverpool Senior Cup performance:
  - Semi-final (3 times)

== Honours ==
- Northern Premier League
  - Division One West champions 2024–25
- North West Counties League
  - Premier Division runners-up 2017–18
  - Division One champions 2016–17
  - League Cup winners 2017-18
