= Dawley Town F.C. =

Association football club in England

Dawley Town
- Full name: Dawley Town Football Club
- Nickname: The Jockeys
- Founded: 1970 (as Telford Juniors); 2020 (as Dawley Town)
- Ground: Hamer Leisure Theatre of Jockeys
- League: North West Counties Football League First Division South
- 2025–26: Shropshire County League Premier Division, 1st (promoted)
Home colours

Dawley Town Football Club is a football club based in Dawley (near Telford), Shropshire, England. They are expected to play in the North West Counties Football League First Division South for the 2026–27 season. They previously played in the Shropshire County League.

The club was formed as Telford Juniors in 1970, and became Dawley Town in 2020.

== History ==
=== Telford Juniors ===
A club named Telford Juniors were established in 1970 and entered the under-16 section of the Oakengates League. In their first season they were finalists in the Cyril White Cup, losing to Stratford Town Colts. In 1971 the club joined the Wrekin Minor League. In June 1973, Telford Juniors were accepted as members of the Wellington League. They resigned from the Wellington League in 1982, and were soon announced as new members of the Shropshire County League.

In the 2014–15 season the team won the Mercian Regional League Premier Division and joined the West Midlands (Regional) League Division Two for the following season. In the 2016–17 season they were champions and gained promotion to Division One. They were relegated back to Division Two in 2019 and left the league after the abandoned 2019–20 season.

=== Dawley Town ===
Dawley Town were formed before the 2020–21 season, described as a "re-boot" of the former Telford Juniors club. In the 2022–23 season they won the Shropshire County League Premier Division with an unbeaten record, having dropped points only once all season. The players celebrated their success by parading around the town on the back of a flatbed scaffolding lorry. Their title would have meant promotion to the Midland League Division One but their ground did not meet the requirements, which also allowed rivals AFC Bridgnorth to avoid relegation from that division. In June 2024 it was reported that the club had gained planning permission to install floodlights, one of the requirements for promotion.

In 2025 they lost 2–1 to Telford Town in the final of the Shropshire Challenge Cup. In the 2025–26 season the club applied for promotion to Step 6 of the National League System. In that season they were again champions of the Shropshire County League, which was confirmed after a 4–4 draw with second-place Church Stretton Town. The team could not complete a double as they lost 2–1 to Ellesmere Rangers in the final of the Tony Bywater Cup. The club were promoted to Step 6 and placed in the North West Counties Football League First Division South for the 2026–27 season.

== Ground ==
The club plays at the Hamer Leisure Theatre of Jockeys, three miles south of Telford Town. In 2024 the club gained planning permission to install floodlights at the ground.

== Honours ==
=== Telford Juniors ===
- Mercian Regional League Premier Division - Champions: 2014–15
- West Midlands (Regional) League Division Two - Champions: 2016–17

=== Dawley Town ===
- Shropshire County League Premier Division - Champions: 2022–23, 2025–26
