= Shropshire County Premier Football League =

- Founded: 1950
- Folded: 2012
- Country: England
- Divisions: Premier Division; Division One
- Number of clubs: 30 (2011–12)
- Feeder to: West Midlands (Regional) League Division Two
- Domestic cup(s): Premier Division Cup; Division One Cup; Ron Jones Memorial Cup SFA: Challenge Cup; Junior Challenge Cup Commander Ethelston Charity Cup
- Last champions: Newport Town (2011–12)

The Shropshire County Premier Football League was an English association football league based in the county of Shropshire. The league, usually known as the Shropshire County League, was founded in 1950 and in the final season had two divisions. It was dissolved in May 2012 and all member clubs transferred to a new, larger Mercian Regional Football League for the 2012–13 season.

Clubs who won this league were promoted to the West Midlands (Regional) League (all champions 2008–2012 were), although on occasion teams (such as Shifnal Town in 1993) instead moved into the Midland Football Combination. The champions of the 2011–12 season – the final season for the league – were Newport Town.

Teams from the Telford Combination were sometimes promoted into the league, as Impact United did in 2008 and Ketley Bank United in 2009. Teams from the Shropshire Alliance were also able to be promoted into the league, as Rock Rovers did in 2011, however the Alliance folded with its last season being 2010–11.

The grounds of several teams in the league, most notably Brown Clee, were featured in David Bauckham's book Dugouts, which noted the high frequency of dugouts with lockable doors which are also used for storage, a feature seemingly unique to clubs in Shropshire.

All scores of the league's Saturday afternoon games were read out on BBC Radio Shropshire, around an hour after full-time.

== 2011–12 season ==
=== Premier Division ===
A total of 14 teams took part in the Premier Division in the 2011–12 season, an increase of two from the previous season. 2010–11 champions Haughmond had been promoted to the West Midlands (Regional) League, no team had been relegated from the Premier Division, while 3 teams had come up from Division One: Wellington Amateurs Reserves, Church Stretton Town and Whitchurch Alport Reserves.

Morda United won the Premier Division Cup, beating Ludlow 3–0 in the final.

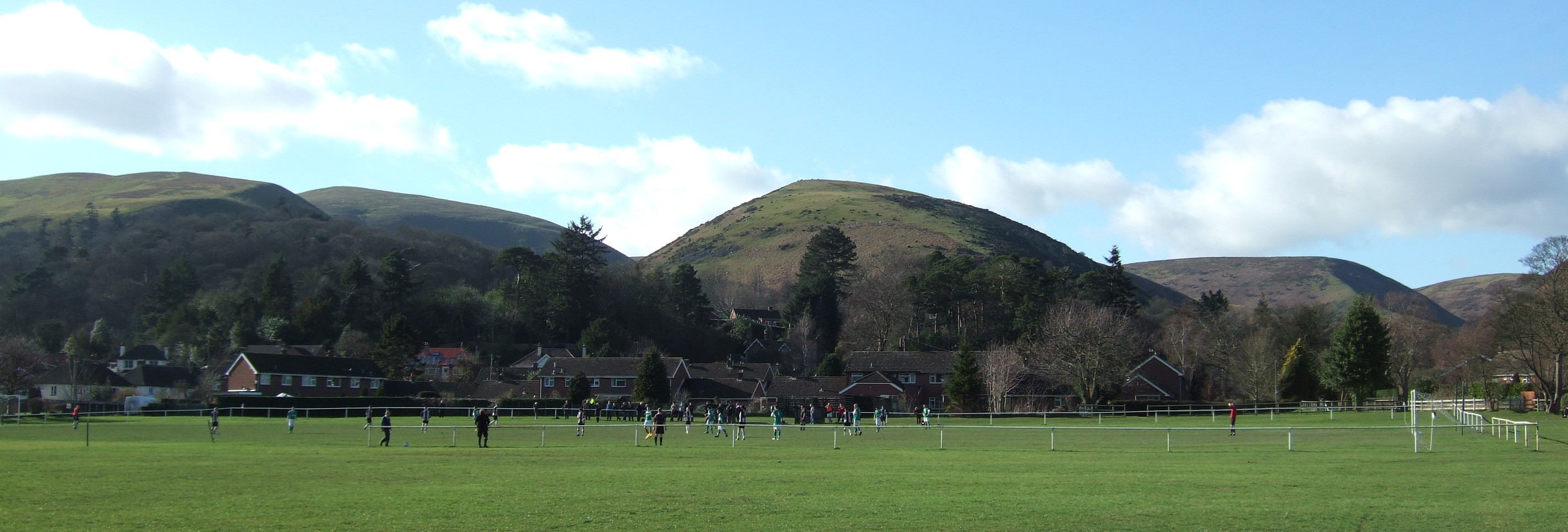
Church Stretton v Newport in the 2011–12 season, at Russell's Meadow – fixed posts around the pitch and dugouts are ground requirements for teams in the Premier Division.

Team name	Home ground	2010–11 finish	2010–11 season points
Broseley Juniors	Birchmeadow, Cockshutt Lane, Broseley	12th	22
Church Stretton Town	Russell's Meadow, Church Stretton	10th	36
Dawley Villa	Doseley Road, Dawley, Telford	11th	30
Ellesmere Rangers Reserves	Beech Grove, Ellesmere	8th	36
FC Hodnet	Hodent Social Club, Hodnet	7th	41
Impact United	Grainger Drive, Leegomery, Telford	14th	5
Ketley Bank United	Ketley Recreation Ground, Bank Way, Ketley Bank, Telford	2nd	51
Ludlow Town	The SBS Stadium, Ludlow	6th	42
Morda United	Weston Road Ground, Morda	3rd	45
Newport Town	Shuker Field, Barnmeadow Road, Newport	1st	55
Shifnal United	Idsall Sports Centre, Shifnal	9th	36
Telford Juniors	Doseley Road, Telford	5th	43
Wellington Amateurs Reserves	School Grove, Oakengates, Telford	4th	44
Whitchurch Alport Reserves	Yockings Park, Black Park Road, Whitchurch	13th	18

=== Division One ===
With the demise of the Shropshire Alliance football league, a total of six teams transferred from the Alliance to the County League: Hopesgate United, Ludlow Town Reserves (they played in the Alliance as Ludlow Town Colts), Oswestry Lions, Prees United, Rock Rovers (2010–11 Alliance champions) and Weston Rhyn. Further, a reserve team of Shawbury United were formed and joined the County League in this division, and Wrockwardine Wood Juniors were promoted from the Shropshire Minor League (they played previously as Oakengates Rangers U18) skipping the Telford Combination. Atlas changed their name to Allscott, and completed the season as the division champions.

The number of teams in Division One therefore increased from 11 in the previous season to 16. With the large number of teams in the division, the Division One Cup and the Ron Jones Memorial Cup competitions did not take place this season.

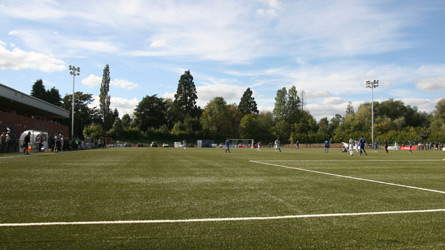
A number of teams use grounds of higher-league clubs, especially the reserve sides; shown here is Park Hall, home ground of TNS.

Team name	Home ground	2010–11 finish	2010–11 season points
Allscott	Allscott Sports & Social, Allscott	1st	71
Bishops Castle Town	Community College, Bishop's Castle	9th	41
Brown Clee	Hall Meadow, Cleobury North	10th	36
Clee Hill United	Cleobury Mortimer Leisure Centre, Cleobury Mortimer	16th	15
Hanwood United Reserves	Hanwood Recreation Ground, Hanwood	4th	57
Hopesgate United	Minsterley Playing Field, Minsterley	14th	23
Ludlow Town Reserves	The SBS Stadium, Ludlow	15th	18
Meole Brace	Church Road, Meole Brace, Shrewsbury	12th	31
Oakengates Athletic	Hadley Learning Centre, Telford	3rd	61
Oswestry Lions	The Venue, Park Hall, Oswestry	8th	50
Prees United	Prees Cricket and Recreation Club, Brades Road, Prees	7th	51
Rock Rovers	Sports Village, Sundorne, Shrewsbury	6th	53
Shawbury United Reserves	Springfield Recreation Ground, Sutton Farm, Shrewsbury†	11th	35
Weston Rhyn	Weston Rhyn Playing Fields, Weston Rhyn	2nd	63
Wrockwardine Wood Juniors	Oakengates Leisure Centre, New Road, Wrockwardine Wood	13th	28
Wroxeter Rovers	Unison Sports Club, Shirehall, Abbey Foregate, Shrewsbury	5th	53

†Began the season playing at RAF Shawbury's "Dawsons Rough" pitch, but moved to Springfield in October 2011.

== 2010–11 season ==
=== Premier Division ===
Haughmond were the Shropshire County Premier Football League Champions 2010–11 (the side came 2nd in the previous season), and the side also won the Ron Jones Memorial Cup. By chance the final match of the season took place between the teams at first and second place (Haughmond and Ellesmere Rangers Reserves) and decided the League Champion. Ludlow Town came third in the league, while Dawley Villa finished bottom with just 9 points. FC Hodnet won the Premier Division Cup, beating Haughmond in the final.

Ludlow Town joined the County League this season, having voluntarily dropped three levels from the West Midlands (Regional) League's Premier Division, because of financial difficulties.

Team name	Home ground	2010–11 finish	2010–11 season points
Broseley Juniors	Birchmeadow, Cockshutt Lane, Broseley	8th	23
Dawley Villa	Doseley Road, Dawley, Telford	12th	9
Ellesmere Rangers Reserves	Beech Grove, Ellesmere	2nd	49
FC Hodnet	Hodent Social Club, Hodnet	5th	39
Haughmond	Sports Village, Sundorne, Shrewsbury	1st	53
Impact United	Grainger Drive, Leegomery, Telford	9th	17
Ketley Bank United	Ketley Recreation Ground, Bank Way, Ketley Bank, Telford	7th	29
Ludlow Town	The SBS Stadium, Ludlow	3rd	44
Morda United	Weston Road Ground, Morda	11th	16
Newport Town	Shuker Field, Barnmeadow Road, Newport	4th	41
Shifnal United	Idsall Sports Centre, Shifnal	6th	34
Telford Juniors	Doseley Road, Telford	10th	16

=== Division One ===
Wellington Amateurs Reserves were the Division One 2010–11 season champions, while Church Stretton Town came second, and Clee Hill United finished bottom with just 7 points. Wellington also won the Division One Cup, beating Bishop's Castle in the final.

Team name	Home ground	2010–11 finish	2010–11 season points
Atlas	Allscott Sports & Social, Allscott	5th	31
Bishop's Castle Town	Community College, Bishop's Castle	7th	30
Brown Clee	Hall Meadow, Cleobury North	9th	24
Church Stretton Town	Russell's Meadow, Church Stretton	2nd	37
Clee Hill United	Cleobury Mortimer Leisure Centre, Cleobury Mortimer	11th	7
Hanwood United Reserves	Hanwood Recreation Ground, Hanwood	8th	24
Meole Brace	Church Road, Meole Brace, Shrewsbury	10th	14
Oakengates Athletic	Hadley Learning Centre, Telford	6th	30
Wellington Amateurs Reserves	School Grove, Oakengates, Telford	1st	45
Whitchurch Alport Reserves	Yockings Park, Black Park Road, Whitchurch	3rd	32
Wroxeter Rovers	Unison Sports Club, Shirehall, Abbey Foregate, Shrewsbury	4th	31

== League champions ==
Season	Champions
1950–51	Lilleshall Miners
1951–52	Donnington Wood
1952–53	Donnington Wood
1953–54	Donnington Wood
1954–55	Sankeys Wellington
1955–56	Market Drayton Town
1956–57	Sentinel
1957–58	Donnington Wood
1958–59	Sankeys Wellington
1959–60	Sankeys Wellington
1960–61	Donnington Wood
1961–62	Oswestry Villa
1962–63	Oswestry Villa
1963–64	Donnington Wood
1964–65	Donnington Wood
1965–66	Sankeys Wellington
1966–67	Snailbeach White Star
1967–68	Donnington Wood
1968–69	Snailbeach White Star
1969–70	Roden Rovers
1970–71	Belle Vue Old Boys

Season	Champions
1971–72	Donnington Wood
1972–73	Snailbeach White Star
1973–74	Donnington Wood
1974–75	Donnington Wood
1975–76	Shifnal Town
1976–77	Broseley Athletic
1977–78	Broseley Athletic
1978–79	Oakengates Town
1979–80	Snailbeach White Star
1980–81	Snailbeach White Star
1981–82	Snailbeach White Star
1982–83	Wellington Amateurs
1983–84	Broseley Athletic
1984–85	Morda United
1985–86	Morda United
1986–87	Morda United
1987–88	Champion Jockey
1988–89	Wellington Amateurs
1989–90	Shifnal Town
1990–91	Albrighton United
1991–92	Little Drayton

Season	Champions
1992–93	Shifnal Town
1993–94	Meole Brace
1994–95	Tibberton United
1995–96	Oakengates Town
1996–97	Star Aluminium
1997–98	Shawbury United
1998–99	Shawbury United
1999–2000	Belvidere
2000–01	abandoned
2001–02	Belle Vue Old Boys
2002–03	Hanwood United
2003–04	Ellesmere Rangers
2004–05	Broseley Juniors
2005–06	Hanwood United
2006–07	Hanwood United
2007–08	Hanwood United
2008–09	Wem Town
2009–10	St Martins
2010–11	Haughmond
2011–12	Newport Town

== Shropshire Alliance ==
The Shropshire Alliance's logo

The Shropshire Alliance was a football league for Shropshire-based teams that ran from the mid-1970s to 2011. It was formed by the merger of the Shrewsbury and West Shropshire Leagues, which were formed in the late 1940s. At its height it comprised three divisions, but the number of teams fell and by the end of the 2010–11 season only 8 teams remained. It was decided in 2011 to fold the league, and 6 of the member teams came over to the Shropshire County League (one of which, Rock Rovers, were the final season's champions and would have been promoted to the County League in any case). The 2010–11 season was therefore the final season. It was a feeder to the County League.

== See also ==
- Mercian Regional Football League
- Shropshire Football Association
- Shropshire#Football
