= Oakengates Athletic F.C. =

Oakengates Athletic
- Full name: Oakengates Athletic Football Club
- Nickname(s): The Gates
- Founded: 1886
- Dissolved: 2018
Home colours	Away colours

Oakengates Athletic Football Club was a football club based in Oakengates, Shropshire.

== History ==
Earliest records of Oakengates Town are from as early as 1886–87 when they lifted the Shropshire Junior Cup. In 1923–24 they entered the Birmingham and District League. A cup win was soon to follow in the 1926–27 season when they lifted the Shropshire Senior Cup. The reserves were also successful in these times with a win in the Junior Cup in 1928–29. The first team won the Birmingham Senior Cup in 1929–30 beating Kidderminster Harriers 3–1 and nearly won the Birmingham and District League in 1930–31 only to lose the title on goal difference. They went on to lift the Shropshire Senior Cup again in season 1930–31 and retained it in 1931–32.

Oakengates won the Commander Ethelston Cup in season 1978–79, a feat which they repeated in the 1988–89 season. They won a Shropshire County League and cup double in the 1978–79 season and retained the cup in the 1979–80 season. A sole County Cup win was achieved in 1992–93. In the 1995–96 season Oakengates Town won a Shropshire County League and Cup double again.

At the start of the 2005–06 season the club was in serious debt, the clubhouse was derelict through vandalism and neglect and Oakengates Town was near extinction. A few locals decided to retain the history of the club and save it. The club was renamed Oakengates Athletic and moved away from its old ground in Oakengates (School Grove) to a new ground at Hadley via a short stay at Oakengates Athletic Stadium.

The club were champions of the Shropshire Premier League in 2013–2014, 2016–17 and 2017–18. In the summer of 2018 they merged into Wellington Amateurs.

== Managers ==
Name	From	To
(England) Shaun Hughes	2016	2018
(England) Carl Probert	2015	2016
(England) Mickey Baker	2013	2015
(England) Lee Mitchell/Bryan Emlyn	2011	2013
(England) Jamie James	2010	2011
(England) Lee Mitchell/Bryan Emlyn	2010	2010
(Wales) Barry Williams	2007	2010

== Honours ==
- Shropshire Premier League
  - Champions 2013–14, 2016–17, 2017–18
- Shropshire County League
  - Premier Division champions 1978–79, 1995–96, 2016–18, 2017–18
  - Premier Division Cup winners 1978–79, 1979–80, 1995–96, 2017–18
- Commander Ethelston Cup winners 1977–78, 1988–89
- Shropshire Senior Cup
  - Winners 1926–27, 1930–31, 1931–32
- Birmingham Senior Cup
  - Winners 1929–30
- Shropshire County Cup
  - Winners 1992–93, 2016–17, 2017–18
- Shropshire Junior Cup
  - Winners 1886–87, 2011–12
