= Shropshire Premier League =

Association football league in Shropshire, England

- Founded: 2012
- Folded: 2020
- Country: England
- Divisions: Premier Division
- Number of clubs: 11
- Feeder to: West Midlands (Regional) League Division Two
- Domestic cup(s): Premier Division Cup; Division One Cup; SFA: Challenge Cup; Junior Challenge Cup
- Last champions: Oakengates Athletic (2017–18)

The Shropshire Premier League was an English association football league based in the county of Shropshire. It was formed as the Mercian Regional Football League for the 2012–13 season, with all member clubs of the dissolved Shropshire County Premier Football League (except for Newport Town who were promoted) transferring membership across. Several teams from the Telford Combination, which also folded at the end of the 2011–12 season, also became members of the Mercian League and joined either Division One or Two.

The league sits at the same levels of the English football league system as the previous Shropshire County and Telford Combination leagues did. It does not, however, form part of the National League System.

Due to the revised English FA rule permitting clubs to play outside of their County the league has lost a number of clubs in recent years, with clubs citing frustrations with the league's hierarchy and also promised plans to improve upon the level it features amongst the FA pyramid being deciding factors. Clubs such as Church Stretton, Rock Rovers, AFC Bridgnorth Reserves (Development) all left for the West Midlands Regional League Div 2. Newport Town Reserves and Market Drayton Tigers joined Staffordshire County Div 2, with Ludlow Town Colts and Clee Hill United opting to join the Herefordshire league. In these years the league also lost established members such as Hodnet, Shifnal and Childs Ercall due to them folding. The league now just features one division of 11 teams, soon to become 10 due to Donnington folding midway through the 2018-19 season.

== Member clubs 2019–20 ==
In the 2018-19 season, the Premier Division consisted of 11 teams.

=== Premier Division ===
Club	Home ground
Stoke Heath	Warrant Road, Market Drayton
Gobowen Celtic	Gobowen Playing Fields, Gobowen, Shropshire
Madeley Sports	Phoenix Sports Centre, Dawley
Donnington	HLC, Hadley, Telford
Brown Clee	Hall Meadow, Cleobury North
Oakengates Rangers	Ketley Recreation Ground, Bank Way, Ketley Bank, Telford
Prees United	Prees Cricket and Recreation Club, Brades Road, Prees
Albrighton FC	Loak Road, Albrighton
Shrewsbury Juniors	Shrewsbury Sports Village, Sundorne, Shrewsbury, Shrewsbury
St. Martins Village	Overton Road Playing Fields, Oswestry
Wrockwardine Wood	New Road, Wrockwardine Wood, Telford

== League champions ==
The following teams have won the Premier Division, gaining promotion to West Midlands (Regional) League Division Two.

Season	Premier Division	Runners-up	Division One	Division Two
2012–13	AFC Ludlow	Telford Juniors	Madeley Sports	Childs Ercall
2013–14	Oakengates Athletic	Church Stretton	Childs Ercall	AFC Broseley
2014–15	Telford Juniors	FC Hodnet	AFC Broseley	Stoke Heath
2015–16	F.C. Oswestry Town	Allscott Heath	Stoke Heath	Madeley Sports Reserves
2016-17	Oakengates Athletic	Church Stretton	Shrewsbury Juniors	
2017–18	Oakengates Athletic	Shrewsbury Juniors	St Martins Village	

== See also ==
- Shropshire Football Association
- Shropshire#Football
- Shropshire County Premier Football League
