= Gary Taylor-Fletcher =

English footballer (born 1981)

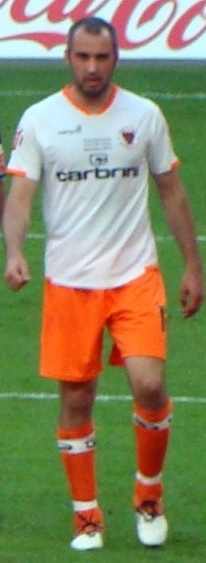
- Taylor-Fletcher playing for Blackpool in 2010

Personal information
- Full name: Gary Taylor-Fletcher
- Birth name: Gary Fletcher
- Date of birth: 4 June 1981 (age 45)
- Place of birth: Widnes, England
- Height: 1.83 m (6 ft 0 in)
- Position: Forward

Team information
- Current team: Widnes Town (manager)

Senior career*
| Years | Team | Apps | (Gls) |
| 1999–2001 | Northwich Victoria | 43 | (11) |
| 2001 | → Hull City (loan) | 5 | (0) |
| 2001–2003 | Leyton Orient | 21 | (1) |
| 2001–2002 | → Grays Athletic (loan) | 4 | (3) |
| 2002 | → Dagenham & Redbridge (loan) | 3 | (1) |
| 2002–2003 | → Dagenham & Redbridge (loan) | 5 | (0) |
| 2003–2005 | Lincoln City | 85 | (27) |
| 2005–2007 | Huddersfield Town | 84 | (22) |
| 2007–2013 | Blackpool | 215 | (36) |
| 2013–2015 | Leicester City | 22 | (3) |
| 2014 | → Sheffield Wednesday (loan) | 4 | (0) |
| 2015 | → Millwall (loan) | 10 | (0) |
| 2015–2016 | Tranmere Rovers | 21 | (2) |
| 2016–2017 | Accrington Stanley | 4 | (0) |
| 2017–2018 | Bangor City | 34 | (10) |
| 2018 | Llandudno | 2 | (3) |
| 2018–2019 | Bangor City | 0 | (0) |
| Total | | 562 | (119) |

Managerial career
- 2017: Bangor City
- 2018–2019: Bangor City
- 2019: Llandudno
- 2022–2023: Nantwich Town (joint-manager)
- 2023–2026: AFC Crewe
- 2026–: Widnes Town
- * Club domestic league appearances and goals

Gary Taylor-Fletcher (né Fletcher; born 4 June 1981) is an English football manager and former professional player who manages Widnes Town. Prior to marrying his wife in June 2004 he was known as Gary Fletcher, adopting the surname Taylor-Fletcher in football terms from the beginning of the 2004–05 season.

As a player he was a forward and has scored in each of the top five divisions of English football. He notably played in the Premier League for Blackpool and Leicester City, as well as in the Football League for Hull City, Leyton Orient, Lincoln City, Huddersfield Town, Sheffield Wednesday, Millwall, Tranmere Rovers and Accrington Stanley. He initially began his career in non-league football with Northwich Victoria and saw further spells on loan in semi-professional football with Grays Athletic and Dagenham & Redbridge.

Taylor-Fletcher moved into management after a brief spell as a player with Bangor City where he would have two spells as player-manager. He held a similar role with Llandudno before being appointed as joint-manager of Nantwich Town in 2022. He was appointed as manager of AFC Crewe in March 2023 a fan-owned football team who play in the premier division of the Staffordshire County Senior League.

== Playing career ==
=== Northwich Victoria ===
Taylor-Fletcher was a roofer by trade and it was during this time he was spotted by scouts of Conference National club Northwich Victoria while playing a charity friendly against a local team made up of labourers. He began his career playing semi-professional football (as Gary Fletcher) with Northwich Victoria in 1999, with whom he scored eighteen goals in 43 appearances. On 16 March 2001, he went on loan to Hull City who were then in the Third Division, the fourth tier of the Football League, where he made five appearances in two months at the club.

=== Leyton Orient ===
On 8 June 2001, Fletcher was signed by another Third Division club, Leyton Orient from Northwich for a fee of £50,000 as he had scored twice against them. Later that year he was sent out on loan to Grays Athletic who were then in the Isthmian League. Fletcher scored three goals in four league games in a loan spell that lasted from 21 December 2001 to 1 March 2002. In October, he spent a month on loan at Conference National club Dagenham & Redbridge, before returning for a second loan spell in December, staying until March 2003.

=== Lincoln City ===
On 14 August 2003, Fletcher signed for Lincoln City on a free transfer, where he was reunited with former Northwich Victoria coach Keith Alexander. In two years with the Imps Taylor-Fletcher made 90 appearances scoring thirty goals. At the start of the 2004–05 season he equalled a 106-year-old club record when he scored in all six opening games. He also won the Supporters Player of the Year award for the 2003–04 season and played for them in the Football League Two play-off final in May 2005, which they lost to Southend United.

=== Huddersfield Town ===
Taylor-Fletcher was acquired by Huddersfield Town on a free transfer from Lincoln City on 14 June 2005. He scored a hat-trick against Chesterfield in the League Cup.

During October and November, Taylor-Fletcher was consistently competing with strikers Paweł Abbott and Andy Booth for a place in the starting line-up, and on most occasions he had to settle for a place on the bench. However, during late December, he came off the bench to score two last-minute equalisers against Rotherham United and Barnsley.

In the New Year, Town manager, Peter Jackson used him as a right winger, and he scored the majority of the team's goals in the 2006–07 season. On 8 August 2006, Taylor-Fletcher scored the 500,000th goal in The Football League, with a 25-yard drive into the top-left corner, to lead the Terriers to a 3–0 home victory over Rotherham United.

In January 2006, he scored against Chelsea in an FA Cup third-round match at Stamford Bridge, which, for seven minutes, put Town on level terms with the Premier League champions.

Towards the end of the season, he scored some more crucial goals against Barnsley and AFC Bournemouth, before scoring Town's only goal in the first leg of the play-offs against Barnsley at Oakwell.

=== Blackpool ===
On 9 July 2007, Taylor-Fletcher signed for Blackpool for an undisclosed fee in a two-year deal, ahead of the Seasiders' first season back in the second tier of English football since 1978. He made his debut in the Championship in the club's first league match of the 2007–08 season, a 1–0 win over Leicester City at the Walkers Stadium on 11 August 2007. He scored his first goal for the club two weeks later, on 25 August, in a 2–1 defeat to Wolverhampton Wanderers at the Molineux Stadium, and went on to score six goals that season. On 20 September 2008, he scored at St Andrew's as Blackpool beat Birmingham City 1–0. In doing so, he became the first player to score against the Blues in the League at St Andrew's in the 2008–09 season and also help Blackpool become the first club to beat them at home since Chelsea in the Premier League in January.

In his first league start since 20 October 2009, Taylor-Fletcher scored twice in a 3–0 win over Middlesbrough at the Riverside Stadium on 8 December. His 100th league appearance for Blackpool came on 9 February 2010, in a 2–0 defeat to Sheffield Wednesday at Hillsborough.

Taylor-Fletcher scored in the 39th minute of the 2010 Football League Championship play-off final against Cardiff City on 22 May 2010. Blackpool were the victors, thus completing Taylor-Fletcher's journey from non-League football to the Premier League since the turn of the millennium.

On 14 August 2010, he scored Blackpool's first-ever Premier League goal, in a 4–0 win over Wigan Athletic on the opening day of the 2010–11 season at the DW Stadium. Twelve months later, Taylor-Fletcher also scored the first goal (for Blackpool and in all) of the 2011–12 Football League season, in a single-goal victory against Hull City at the KC Stadium. He was released in the summer of 2013 after his Blackpool contract expired, his exit coinciding with a downturn in Blackpool's fortunes.

=== Leicester City ===
On 20 September 2013, Taylor-Fletcher joined Leicester City on a one-year deal. He made his debut just a day later coming on as a late substitute against his former side Blackpool. He scored his first goal for the Foxes in a 5–3 win over Bolton Wanderers at the King Power Stadium. Taylor-Fletcher made 21 appearances in the league (23 in all competitions), scoring three goals, as Leicester were promoted to the Premier League as champions. On 8 May, he extended his contract by a further year.

Despite his new contract, Taylor-Fletcher was omitted from Leicester's 25-man squad for the 2014–15 Premier League season. On 25 October 2014 he joined Sheffield Wednesday on a month-long loan. The following February, he joined Championship strugglers Millwall on loan for the rest of the season, signed by his former Blackpool manager Ian Holloway.

=== Later career ===
On 17 October 2015, Taylor-Fletcher signed for National League side Tranmere Rovers on a short-term deal 30 minutes before kick-off against league leaders Forest Green Rovers. He scored in the fifth minute of his Rovers debut, which Tranmere won 2–0.

On 3 October 2016, he signed for Accrington Stanley on a non-contract deal. He made his debut on 4 October 2016 in the newly revamped EFL Trophy, scoring a goal in Accrington's 4–1 win over Chesterfield.

He became caretaker player-manager of Bangor City in March 2017, stepping down to assistant manager when the club appointed Kevin Nicholson in May 2017. The pair led the club to a second-placed finish in the Welsh Premier League during the 2017–18 season but left Bangor in May 2018 after the club was demoted after failing to obtain a tier one licence.

He signed for Llandudno in November 2018, and scored twice on his debut in a 4–2 defeat to Bala Town. On 27 November 2018, he returned to Bangor as manager. He also played for the club in the Cymru Alliance. On 7 May 2019, Taylor-Fletcher was appointed manager of Llandudno. Two days later, Taylor-Fletcher resigned due to business commitments.

He retired from football in June 2019.

== Coaching career ==
In August 2020, Taylor-Fletcher revealed that he would be moving to New York to take up a permanent coaching role with the National Centre of Excellence (NCE).

In September 2022, Taylor-Fletcher was appointed joint-manager of Northern Premier League Premier Division side Nantwich Town with Ritchie Sutton following a spell as interim manager. The duo left the club in February 2023, with Nantwich sitting in the relegation zone, three points from safety.

On 23 March 2023, Taylor-Fletcher was appointed manager of AFC Crewe.

On 25 August 2026, Taylor-Fletcher was appointed manager of Widnes Town.

== Personal life ==
Born in Widnes, Taylor-Fletcher pursued a career in roofing.

== Career statistics ==
Appearances and goals by club, season and competition
| Club | Season | League | | | National cup (Note: Includes FA Cup, Welsh Cup) | | League cup (Note: Includes Football League Cup, Welsh League Cup) | | Other | | Total | |
| Club | Season | Division | Apps | Goals | Apps | Goals | Apps | Goals | Apps | Goals | Apps | Goals |
|---|---|---|---|---|---|---|---|---|---|---|---|---|
| Northwich Victoria | 1999–2000 | Football Conference | 19 | 3 | 0 | 0 | – | | 0 | 0 | 19 | 3 |
| Northwich Victoria | 2000–01 | Football Conference | 24 | 8 | 4 | 3 | – | | 2 (Note: Appearances in Conference League Cup) | 2 | 30 | 13 |
| Northwich Victoria | Total | | 43 | 11 | 4 | 3 | – | | 2 | 2 | 49 | 16 |
| Hull City (loan) | 2000–01 | Third Division | 5 | 0 | 0 | 0 | 0 | 0 | 0 | 0 | 5 | 0 |
| Leyton Orient | 2001–02 | Third Division | 9 | 0 | 0 | 0 | 0 | 0 | 0 | 0 | 9 | 0 |
| Leyton Orient | 2002–03 | Third Division | 12 | 1 | 2 | 0 | 1 | 1 | 0 | 0 | 15 | 2 |
| Leyton Orient | Total | | 21 | 1 | 2 | 0 | 1 | 1 | 0 | 0 | 24 | 2 |
| Grays Athletic (loan) | 2002–03 | Isthmian League | 4 | 3 | 0 | 0 | – | | 0 | 0 | 4 | 3 |
| Dagenham and Redbridge (loan) | 2002–03 | Football Conference | 8 | 1 | 0 | 0 | – | | 1 (Note: Appearances Football League Trophy) | 0 | 9 | 1 |
| Lincoln City | 2003–04 | Third Division | 44 | 17 | 2 | 0 | 0 | 0 | 2 | 2 | 48 | 19 |
| Lincoln City | 2004–05 | League Two | 41 | 10 | 1 | 0 | 2 | 1 | 1 | 0 | 45 | 11 |
| Lincoln City | Total | | 85 | 27 | 3 | 0 | 2 | 1 | 3 | 2 | 93 | 30 |
| Huddersfield Town | 2005–06 | League One | 45 | 11 | 3 | 1 | 2 | 3 | 1 | 0 | 51 | 15 |
| Huddersfield Town | 2006–07 | League One | 39 | 11 | 1 | 0 | 1 | 0 | 0 | 0 | 41 | 11 |
| Huddersfield Town | Total | | 84 | 22 | 4 | 1 | 3 | 3 | 1 | 0 | 92 | 26 |
| Blackpool | 2007–08 | Championship | 42 | 6 | 1 | 0 | 3 | 0 | – | | 46 | 6 |
| Blackpool | 2008–09 | Championship | 38 | 5 | 0 | 0 | 1 | 0 | – | | 39 | 5 |
| Blackpool | 2009–10 | Championship | 32 | 6 | 1 | 0 | 2 | 1 | 3 (Note: Appearances in Football League Championship play-offs) | 1 | 38 | 8 |
| Blackpool | 2010–11 | Premier League | 31 | 6 | 0 | 0 | 1 | 0 | – | | 32 | 6 |
| Blackpool | 2011–12 | Championship | 37 | 8 | 3 | 0 | 0 | 0 | 2 | 0 | 42 | 8 |
| Blackpool | 2012–13 | Championship | 35 | 5 | 1 | 0 | 1 | 0 | – | | 37 | 5 |
| Blackpool | Total | | 215 | 36 | 6 | 0 | 8 | 1 | 5 | 1 | 234 | 38 |
| Leicester City | 2013–14 | Championship | 21 | 3 | 0 | 0 | 2 | 0 | – | | 23 | 3 |
| Leicester City | 2014–15 | Premier League | 1 | 0 | 0 | 0 | 1 | 0 | – | | 2 | 0 |
| Leicester City | Total | | 22 | 3 | 0 | 0 | 3 | 0 | – | | 25 | 3 |
| Sheffield Wednesday (loan) | 2014–15 | Championship | 4 | 0 | 0 | 0 | 0 | 0 | – | | 4 | 0 |
| Millwall (loan) | 2014–15 | Championship | 10 | 0 | 0 | 0 | 0 | 0 | – | | 10 | 0 |
| Tranmere Rovers | 2015–16 | National League | 21 | 2 | 0 | 0 | – | | – | | 21 | 2 |
| Accrington Stanley | 2016–17 | League Two | 4 | 0 | 0 | 0 | 0 | 0 | 2 | 1 | 6 | 1 |
| Bangor City | 2016–17 | Welsh Premier League | 12 | 2 | 1 | 1 | 0 | 0 | 0 | 0 | 13 | 3 |
| Bangor City | 2017–18 | Welsh Premier League | 22 | 8 | 1 | 0 | 0 | 0 | 2 (Note: Appearances in UEFA Europa League) | 0 | 25 | 8 |
| Llandudno | 2018–19 | Welsh Premier League | 2 | 3 | 0 | 0 | 0 | 0 | – | | 2 | 3 |
| Bangor City | 2018–19 | Cymru Alliance | | | 1 | 0 | 0 | 0 | – | | 1 | 0 |
| Career total | | | 562 | 119 | 22 | 3 | 17 | 6 | 16 | 6 | 617 | 136 |

== Honours ==
Blackpool

- Football League Championship play-offs: 2010

Leicester City

- Football League Championship: 2013–14
