= Huddersfield and District Association Football League =

Association football league in England

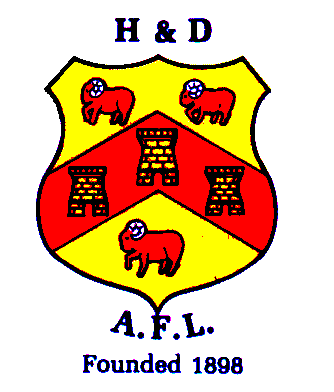
- Founded: 1898
- Country: England
- Confederation: FA
- Divisions: 6
- Number of clubs: 67
- Feeder to: Manchester League; Sheffield & Hallamshire County Senior League; West Yorkshire League; Yorkshire Amateur League
- Relegation to: none
- Domestic cup(s): Barlow Cup: Berry Brow; Groom Cup: AFC Volunteers; Richardson Cup: Honley Reserves; Huddersfield FA Challenge Cup: Berry Brow; Huddersfield FA Challenge Trophy: Linthwaite Athletic Reserves
- Current champions: Premier: Honley FC; Division One: Saddleworth United; Division Two: Berry Brow Reserves; Division Three: Berry Brow 'A'; Division Four: Kirkheaton Rovers Reserves; Division Five: Deighton 'A' (2023-24)
- Most championships: Brackenhall United
- Current: 2026-27

The Huddersfield and District Association League is a football competition based in the area of Huddersfield, England. It was founded in 1898. The league has a total of five senior divisions. The highest senior division, Premier Division, is a feeder to the West Yorkshire and Yorkshire Amateur Leagues.

The league currently has 67 teams during the 2023-24 season. Honley FC are the current champions and Diggle FC the Barlow Cup holders for 2025-26.

The most successful team in a single division since 2000, is Brackenhall United with 4 championships from 2000 to 2003. The most successful team in all divisions is Newsome, with six championships starting in the now-defunct Division Five during the 1999–2000 season and ending with the Division One championship during the 2006–07 season. Newsome again won the First Division title in the 2009–10 season and the 2014-15 season.

The league generally consists of teams around Huddersfield in West Yorkshire, however there are also a few teams located in Greater Manchester including the Saddleworth area of Oldham, They compete in this league because the area these clubs are based in is historically part of West Yorkshire. There are 3 Semi professional clubs that were previous members, Emley A.F.C., Golcar United F.C. and Shelley C.F.C..

== History ==
The league was founded in 1898. In 1919, there were 42 senior clubs and 78 junior clubs in the league. Throughout the league's history, the most players in the league at one time was 3,000. During the 2007–08 season, there were 41 divisions of junior clubs in the Huddersfield RCD Junior Football League, based in the same area, with some teams continuing to the HDAFL.

== Member clubs 2019–20 ==
The league has a system of relegation and promotion based on club success. The bottom three teams in the first division are replaced with the top three teams in the second division. The bottom three teams in the second division are replaced by the top three teams in the third division. The bottom three teams in the third division are replaced by the top three teams in the fourth division. The system has allowed teams to rise from a lower division to a higher one within several years. Newsome were playing in the now-defunct fifth division during the 2000–01 season, but rose to the first division to win the first division in 2006–07 after playing 3 seasons in the second division.

The 2019–20 constitution is as follows:

=== Division One ===
- Berry Brow
- Diggle
- Fothergill and Whittles
- Heywood Irish Centre
- Holmbridge FC
- Honley
- Linthwaite Athletic (Badgers)
- Newsome
- Scholes A.F.C
- Shepley F.C
- Skelmanthorpe A.F.C
- Slaithwaite United

=== Division Two ===
- AFC Lindley
- AFC Dalton
- Almondbury Woolpack
- Britannia Sports
- Colne Valley
- Cumberworth
- Holme Valley Academicals
- Honley
- Lepton Highlanders
- Marsden
- Moorside
- Netherton
- Scholes
- Shelley
- Slaithwaite United

=== Division Three ===
- 3D Dynamos
- Almondbury Working Mens Club
- Brighouse Athletic
- Brook Motors
- Cask
- Dalton Dynamos
- Deighton FC
- Fothergill-Whittles
- Hade Edge
- Junction
- Littleborough
- Scissett
- Uppermill
- Wooldale Wanderers

=== Division Four ===
- Cartworth Moor
- Cleckheaton AFC
- Dewsbury Town
- Flockton FC
- Golcar United
- Grange Moor Saints
- ~~Heyside FC~~
- Kirkburton
- Mount
- Rose and Crown
- Sporting CAV (formerly Cavalry Arms)
- Westend

== Champions ==
Season	One	Two	Three	Four	Five
1998–99	Brackenhall United	Wooldale Wanderers	Scissett	Flockton	Weavers Arms
1999–2000	Brackenhall United	Slaithwaite United	New Mill 94	Weavers Arms	Brook Motors
2000–01	Brackenhall United	Heywood Sports	Holme Valley Academicals	Moldgreen	Newsome Working Mens Club
2001–02	Brackenhall United	Skelmanthorpe	Uppermill	Newsome Working Mens Club	Linthwaite Athletic
2002–03	Brackenhall United	Kirkburton	Newsome Working Mens Club	The Stag	Cravens
2003–04	Meltham Athletic	Uppermill	KKS Ashbrow	Weavers Arms	Space
2004–05	Meltham Athletic	Sovereign Sports	Weavers Arms	Space	Brook Motors
2005–06	Heywood Sports	Newsome Working Mens Club	Scholes	Westend	
2006–07	Newsome Working Mens Club	Britannia Sports	Westend	SC Cowlersley	
2007–08	Heywood Irish Centre	Sovereign Sports	Lamb Inn	Dalton Crusaders	
2008–09	Lepton Highlanders	Cumberworth	Scissett	Royal Dolphins	
2009–10	Newsome Working Mens Club	Netherton	Holmbridge	Shelley	
2010–11	Hepworth United	Slaithwaite United	Shelley	AFC Waterloo	
2011–12	Hepworth United	Scholes	Dalton Crusaders	Moldgreen Con	
2012–13	Uppermill	Britannia Sports	Honley	AFC Lindley	
2013–14	Newsome	Holmfirth Town	KKS Spartans	Royal Oak	
2014–15	Newsome	Heyside	Marsden	Salendine Nook	
2015–16	Hepworth United	Aimbry	Slaithwaite United	Almondbury Woolpack	
2016–17	Meltham Athletic	Berry Brow	Almondbury Woolpack	Dalton Dynamos	
2017–18	Heywood Irish Centre FC	Slaithwaite United	Fothergill-Whittles	Dewsbury Town	
2018–19	Linthwaite Athletic (Badgers)	Fothergill-Whittles	Junction	Huddersfield YMCA	
