= Listed buildings in Cleobury North =

Cleobury North is a civil parish in Shropshire, England. It contains three listed buildings that are recorded in the National Heritage List for England. Of these, one is listed at Grade II*, the middle of the three grades, and the others are at Grade II, the lowest grade. The parish contains the village of Cleobury North and the surrounding countryside. The listed buildings consist of a church, the war memorial in the churchyard, and the nearby rectory.

== Key ==
Grade	Criteria
II*	Particularly important buildings of more than special interest
II	Buildings of national importance and special interest

== Buildings ==
Name and location	Photograph	Date	Notes	Grade
Church of St Peter and St Paul; 52.47964°N 2.55621°W		Late 12th century	The oldest part of the church is the tower, with most of the body of the church dating from the 13th century. The chancel roof dates from the 16th century and the nave roof from the 17th century. Alterations were carried out to the church in the 19th century. The church is in stone, and consists of a nave, a short south aisle, a south porch, a chancel with a north vestry, and a southwest tower. The tower has a brick top stage and a pyramidal roof.	II*
Old Rectory; 52.48018°N 2.55586°W		Late 18th century (probable)	The rectory is in stone, it is partly rendered and has a tile roof. There are two storeys and three bays. The windows are sashes, and above the door is a fanlight with a pointed head.	II
War memorial 52.47957°N 2.55643°W		1920	The war memorial is in the churchyard of the Church of St Peter and St Paul. It is in sandstone and consists of a cross with a tapered octagonal shaft on a moulded base and a stepped plinth. There is a limestone plaque with an inscription, and there are further inscriptions and the names of those lost in the two World Wars on the plinth.	II
