= Allscott =

Village in Shropshire, England

Coordinates: 52.714°N 2.573°W

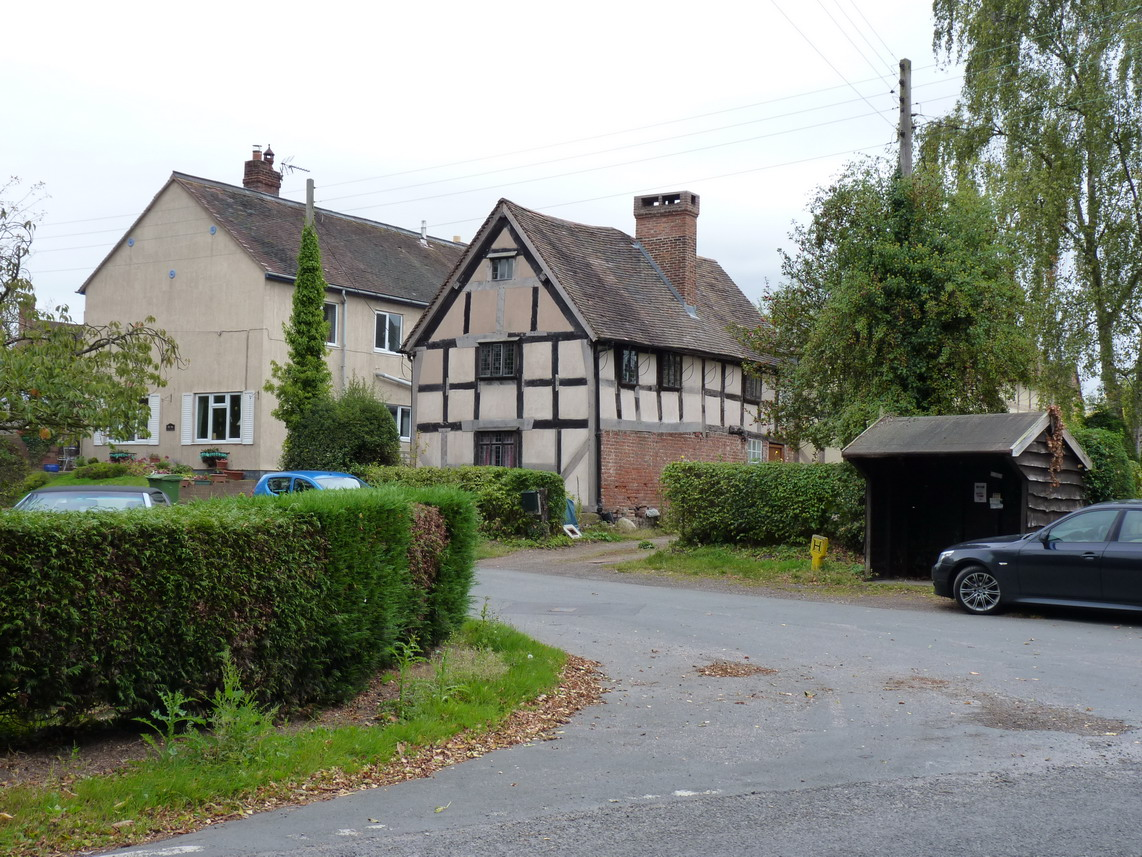
- Cottages in Allscott

- Location within Shropshire
- OS grid reference: SJ612131
- Civil parish: Wrockwardine
- Unitary authority: Telford and Wrekin
- Ceremonial county: Shropshire
- Region: West Midlands
- Country: England
- Sovereign state: United Kingdom
- Post town: TELFORD
- Postcode district: TF6
- Dialling code: 01952
- Police: West Mercia
- Fire: Shropshire
- Ambulance: West Midlands
- UK Parliament: The Wrekin

Allscott is a small village 3 miles (4.8 km) north west of Wellington, Shropshire. The River Tern flows by. It falls within the parish of Wrockwardine and the borough of Telford and Wrekin. Nearby is the small village of Walcot.

== Etymology ==
The name derives from Aldescote, which translates as Aldred's Cottage.

== Recent history ==
In 1927, a factory for processing sugar beet (which came to be owned by British Sugar), was built near to the village and became a major local employer. Two silos each with a capacity to store 10,000 tons of granulated sugar were constructed by John Laing & Sons on the site in 1961. One of the small steam locomotives that used to work in the factory has been preserved at the Foxfield Railway in Staffordshire. The factory closed in 2007, and most of the factory buildings were demolished shortly thereafter. In 2009, the silos were pulled down. In 2015, an application to build 470 homes on the site was granted permission by Telford and Wrekin Council. Construction of the housing estate named Allscot Meads commenced in 2020, followed in 2023 by the opening of Allscot Meads Primary School, and provision of new sports facilities included a clubhouse, football pitches and bowling greens.

Concerns about overcrowded roads have led to calls for a railway station to be opened on the site as it is adjacent to the Shrewsbury to Wolverhampton Line, but the developers have stated that a railway station is not in their plans.

== Sport ==
Allscott Heath F.C. is the village's association football club based at the Allscott Sports & Social Club. The club currently competes in the North West Counties League Division One South. The 2022–23 season saw the club win the West Midlands (Regional) League Division One title. They have also finished runners-up in the Mercian Regional League Premier Division (2015-16 season) and won the Shropshire County Challenge Cup on one occasion (2014-15), as well as the Shropshire County Football League Division One league title (2011–12).

Allscott Cricket Club plays in Division 1 of the Shropshire County Cricket League after being relegated from the Premier Division in 2014.

== Namesake ==
There is another hamlet in Shropshire also called Allscott, but to the northeast of Bridgnorth and in the parish of Worfield in the south-east of the county (grid reference SO737962).

== See also ==
- Listed buildings in Wrockwardine
