= Uppermill F.C. =

Association football club in England

Uppermill
- Full name: Uppermill Football Club
- Founded: 1923
- Ground: Seel Park
- Chairman: Simon Tait
- Manager: Mark Howard
- League: North West Counties League Division One North
- 2025–26: Manchester League Premier Division, 2nd of 16 (promoted)
- Website: www.uppermillafc.co.uk
Home colours

Uppermill Football Club is a football club based in Mossley, Greater Manchester, England. They are currently members of the North West Counties League Division One North.

== History ==
Uppermill F.C. were established in 1923. They spent several decades in the Huddersfield and District League, and in 2012–13, their final season in that league, Uppermill finished as league champions. They then moved to the Manchester League for the start of the 2013–14 season. They finished second out of sixteen in 2025–26, and their application to join the North West Counties League for the 2026–27 season was accepted.

In 2026, the club was admitted into the North West Counties League Division One North.

== Ground ==
Beginning with the 2024–25 season, Uppermill has shared Seel Park with Mossley A.F.C. of the Northern Premier League.
