= A.F.C. Knowsley =

Association football club in England

- Founded: 1987
- Ground: Lord Derby Pavillion
- Chairman: Mike Gibbons
- League: North West Counties League Division One North
- 2025–26: Cheshire League Premier Division, 4th of 16
- Website: afcknowsley.co.uk
Home colours

A.F.C. Knowsley is a football club based in Knowsley, Merseyside, England. They are currently members of the North West Counties League Division One North.

== History ==
Knowsley South F.C. were established in 1987. They joined Cheshire League Two for the 2019–20 season, and despite the season being curtailed (with 17 matches played out of 24 scheduled) due to the COVID-19 pandemic, they were promoted to Cheshire League One for the 2020–21 season. At the end of this, a second promotion to the Premier Division followed, and before competing in the 2021–22 season the club changed its name to A.F.C. Knowsley. After three seasons in the Premier Division, A.F.C. Knowsley transferred to Division One of the West Cheshire League, where they spent two seasons. They finished fourth out of sixteen in 2025–26, and their application to join the North West Counties League for the 2026–27 season was accepted.

In 2026, the club was admitted into the North West Counties League Division One North.
