= Crewe F.C. =

Association football club in England

Crewe
- Full name: Crewe Football Club
- Founded: 1998
- Ground: The Excel, Crewe FC Sports Pavilion
- Chairman: Steve Parker
- Manager: Adam Vickers; Joe Pointon
- League: North West Counties League Division One South
- 2025–26: Cheshire League Premier Division, 5th of 16 (promoted)
- Website: www.crewefc.org.uk
Home colours	Away colours

Crewe Football Club is a football club based in Crewe, Cheshire, England. They are currently members of the North West Counties League Division One South.

== History ==
Crewe F.C. were established in 1998, and joined the Mid-Cheshire League for the 1998–99 season. They remained in that league, and its successor, the Cheshire League, until the 2025–26 season; their highest final position being fourth (out of sixteen) in the 2014–15 season. Although they finished fifth out of sixteen in 2025–26, their application to join the North West Counties League for the 2026–27 season was accepted.

In 2026, the club was admitted into the North West Counties League Division One South.
