= Telford Town F.C. =

Association football club in England

Coordinates: 52.6946°N 2.4600°W

Telford Town
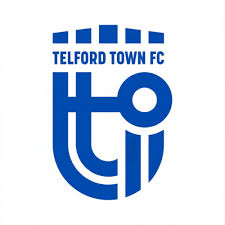
- Full name: Telford Town Football Club
- Nickname: The Ams
- Founded: 1950
- Ground: The Lionheart Security Services Stadium, School Grove, Telford
- Capacity: 1,500
- Chairman: Hayden Dando and Jonathan Stone
- Manager: Elys Brooks-Davies
- League: North West Counties League Division One South
- 2025–26: North West Counties League Division One South, 8th of 18
- Website: https://www.telfordtownfc.co.uk/
Home colours	Away colours	Third colours

Telford Town Football Club is an English football club from Telford, Shropshire. The club plays in the North West Counties League Division One South and were formerly known as Wellington Amateurs. After many years in the Wellington League, the team was promoted to the Shropshire County Football League. They were promoted to the West Midlands (Regional) League in 2006. "The Ams" won Division One three times in four seasons and gained promotion to the Premier Division for 2012–13. In 2024 the club was taken over by former Hednesford Town owner Hayden Dando and renamed Telford Town Football Club. The club won the treble in 2024/25 winning the West Midlands (Regional) League Premier Division, The Powell Cup and the Shropshire Challenge Cup.

== History ==
The club was formed in 1950 as Old Wellingtonians by former students of Wellington Grammar School. The name was later changed to Wellington Amateurs F.C. when the Head Master of the school discovered that the club had started accepting players that were not former pupils. After 31 years in the Wellington League, the club joined the Shropshire County Football League Division One in 1981. In their inaugural season, Wellington won the league and cup double, gaining promotion to the Premier Division. They won the Premier Division in 1982–83 and 1988–89, and finished runners-up in 2005–06, allowing them to apply for membership of the West Midlands (Regional) League Division Two. Wellington won the league in their first season and gained promotion to Division One. Despite winning the league in 2008–09 and 2009–10, they were not promoted due to their ground not being up to standard. After ground improvements, and winning the league in 2011–12, Wellington were promoted to the Premier Division. The club captured their first bit of silverware in a decade when they defeated Shrewsbury Juniors at the New Bucks Head on Tuesday 10 May 2022, winning the game 1-0 thanks to a Charlie Knowles goal. With this they lifted the Shropshire Challenge cup. Days after Tom White stepped down, Development manager former Port Vale and Greenock Morton goalkeeper Matthew Boswell took over the first team managers role.

In 2023, the club entered a development side into the Shropshire County League Premier Division. The team competed under the name AMS FC.

In January 2024 the club was taken over by businessman and former Hednesford Town owner Hayden Dando and renamed Telford Town Football Club.

The club captured its first silverware following the change to Telford Town on Sunday 29 April as they beat Shrewsbury Up n Comers 3–0 at Wem Town's Butler Sports Ground with goals from Will Evans and a brace from Josh Beamond to win the Powell Cup for the first time.

In the summer of 2024 the club announced they would begin to field youth teams and a number of junior sides entered into competitions for the 2024/25 season. A women’s section of the club was announced and entered a Ladies team into the Shropshire Women’s Superleague for the 2024/25 season. The ladies team went on to be crowned champions scoring a record 162 goals and conceding just 10 whilst finishing runners up in the Shropshire League Cup.

In the 2024/25 season the club won a treble lifting the West Midlands (Regional) League Premier Division in 2024/25 losing just once all season, being unbeaten at home, scoring 94 goals and conceding just 15. Retaining the Powell Cup beating Haughmond in the final on penalties after a 0-0 draw before going on to lift the Shropshire Challenge Cup against Dawley Town 2-1 with goals from Jordan Jones and Rune Corinaldi.

In the summer of 2025 the club announced further growth with over 30 sides representing the club in the season ahead including a reserve side replacing the previous development side, a ladies Under 18’s, an under 19’s, 2 under 18’s sides and a host of junior sides. The club also set up a disability football section, Veterans team and walking football section whilst announcing free season tickets for current and former members of the Armed Forces and handing out free season tickets to local school children. The club also held its first juniors 5 a side tournament which was a regional success with teams complimenting its setup and organisation. The club also began a full time academy side competing in the Youth Development League.

In December 2025 first team manager Matthew Boswell resigned his role.

On 5th of January 2026 Steve Hinks was named as the clubs new first team manager, yet after less than 2 months at the helm he left the club by mutual consent following a 12-0 thrashing by Runcorn Town.

On 14th of April interim managers Shaun Ralph and Graham Jones were made the permanent management team having finished in 8th position in The North West Counties Division One South, the highest finish in the club's history, Jones however did not stay on due to work commitments with former Sheffield Wednesday defender Aaron Lescott being named as Ralph’s assistant.

In mid 2026 it was announced that American-based businessman Jonathan Stone had purchased 50% of the club's shares and would become joint Chairman with Dando.

Since the new partnership has begun, Stone and Dando have already announced new investment and support for the Women's team which will allow them to continue their progress through the Pyramid.

In early August 2026 it was announced the club had parted ways with manager Shaun Ralph and his Assistant Aaron Lescott by mutual Consent. Mike Dunn was appointed on August 22nd as the clubs new manager. Dunn resigned at the end of October having picked up just 1 point during his time in charge. Elys Brooks-Davies was appointed as his replacement.

== Colours ==
Telford Town's colours are Blue shirts, White shorts and Red socks. The away colours are Lilac shirts, Turquoise shorts and Lilac socks. The third kit is all yellow

== Ground ==
The club plays its home matches at The Lionheart Security Services Stadium in School Grove in Oakengates, Telford. The stadium has a capacity of 1500 with 2 undercover stands and a terrace. The Main Stand, The Army and Spud Terrace (named after the club's most successful management team) and The Wednesday Crew Stand named after the club's volunteers at the opposite side of the stadium to the main stand. The bar is named The Dave Gregory Clubhouse after the former chairman of the club. The club's record attendance is 321 set at a pre-season friendly game with Stafford Rangers in 2025

== Honours ==
=== League honours ===
- West Midlands (Regional) League Division One
  - Champions 2008–09, 2009–10, 2011–12
  - Runners-up 2010–11
- West Midlands (Regional) League Premier Division Champions 2024-25
- West Midlands (Regional) League Division Two
  - Champions 2007–08
- Shropshire County Football League Premier Division
  - Champions 1982–83, 1988–89
- Shropshire County Football League Division One
  - Champions 1981–82
- Wellington League Division Two
  - 1954–55, 1960–61
- Wellington League Division Three
  - 1961–62

=== Cup honours ===
- West Midlands (Regional) League Division One Cup
  - Winners 2010–11
- Shropshire County Football League Premier Division Cup
  - Winners 1998–99
- WJ Evans Cup
  - Winners 1986–87
- Shrewsbury Town Directors Cup
  - Winners 1991–92
- Commander Ethelstone Cup
  - Winners 1990–91, 2003–04
- Wellington Senior Cup
  - Winners 1969–70, 1970–71
- Shropshire Challenge Cup
  - Winners 2021–22, 2024-25
- Powell Cup
  - Winners 2023–24, 2024-25

Ladies honours

- Shropshire Women’s Superleague
  - Winners 2024-25
- Shropshire Women’s League Cup
  - Runners Up 2024-25

== Records ==
- FA Vase
  - First Round 2018–19
- Highest league position: 8th in North West Counties Division One South 2025-26
- Attendance 321 v Stafford Rangers 2025

== See also ==
- Football in Shropshire
