= Shropshire Football Association =

- Shropshire FA logo
- Purpose: Football association
- Location: Shrewsbury, Shropshire
- Coordinates: 52.68°N 2.74°W
- Chief Executive: Andy Weston
- Website: www.shropshirefa.com

The Shropshire Football Association is the governing body of football in the county of Shropshire, England.

Cup competitions it organises include the Shropshire Senior Cup, the Challenge Cup and the Junior Challenge Cup.

== See also ==
- Football in Shropshire
- Mercian Regional Football League
- Shropshire County Premier Football League
