= Shawbury United F.C. =

Association football club in England

Coordinates: 52°51′26.71″N 2°43′35.78″W

Shawbury United
- Full name: Shawbury United Football Club
- Founded: 1992
- Ground: Shawbury Community Sports Centre, Shawbury
- Capacity: 1,000
- Chairman: Dave Richards
- Manager: Matthew Boswell
- League: North West Counties League Division One South
- 2025–26: North West Counties League Division One South, 15th of 18
Home colours	Away colours

Shawbury United Football Club are a football club from Shawbury, Shropshire, England. They were established in 1992. They are members of the North West Counties League Division One South.

== History ==
Shawbury United are one of the newer clubs in the West Midlands region, having been formed in 1992. They started out playing in the Shrewsbury and Shropshire Alliance Division Two. They swiftly progressed up the divisions, winning a number of local cups along the way, and in 1999-00 the club were rewarded with admission to the West Midlands (Regional) League, initially in Division One North. In 2000–01 they were promoted to the Premier Division, and then to the Midland Football League in 2016, where they remain to this day.

2006–07 was a disappointing season for Shawbury in which the club finished bottom of the West Midlands Premier Division in 21st position, however due to Great Wyrley resigning from the league early on and Wyrley Rangers folding at the end of the season Shawbury avoided relegation. The following season 2007–08 was a totally different story. With Shawbury paying players for the first time, manager Delwyn Humphreys was able to steer the club into the higher reaches of the division and a run to the last 32 of the F.A. Vase (a club record). In what was to be a dramatic and bizarre ending to the season, Humphreys resigned as the season entered its final weeks. Paul Mellings took over the reins and helped Shawbury to equal their best finish of 3rd, despite other teams having many games in hand on Shawbury at one point. However Bewdley Town who had finished 2nd were deducted 3 points for a breach of the rules. This brought Bewdley back to the same points as Shawbury but Shawbury would finish in 2nd place with a goal difference +1 better than the Worcestershire side.

In June 2008 Ally McHarrie was appointed as the club's new manager for 2008–09, but his tenure did not live up to the previous season's achievements and he was sacked just after the turn of the year, with the side lingering in lower mid-table and out of all the more prestigious cup competitions in the early stages. After a slight upturn in form towards the end a disappointing season finished with Shawbury in 10th place and long serving player Steve Giles eventually taking the management reins for 2009–10. Life did not get any better for Shawbury, as 2009–10 began with the club bottom of the league after the early stages. In October 2009, the club drafted in Craig Rogers as manager. Previously managing in the Shropshire County League and being young in years (26), it was seen as a gamble by the club. Despite having a good 2nd half to the season they still ended up finishing bottom of the league. They were however saved from relegation and with a pre-season of regeneration approaching they will be hoping for a more successful season next time around.

After an inconsistent season, manager Craig Rogers resigned in March 2011. Despite their troubles his tenure had to be regarded as a success having turned a team that were struggling for points and players to a competitive team in the WMPL. Steve Giles took the reins as caretaker manager until the end of the 2010/11 season.

Shawbury picked up their first win under Giles (and first since 22 Jan 11) with a 2–1 home victory over Wolverhampton Casuals and a final day win at Wellington confirmed that Shawbury would finish 17th in the league and retain their premier division status.

=== A new era ===
Dave Richards resigned as Wem Town manager on 7 May 2011 after guiding the club from the Shropshire County league to West Midlands Division 1 in 3 seasons. His appointment as Shawbury's new manager was confirmed on Wednesday 11 May 2011. He was joined by his assistant from Wem Town, Shaun Ingram, and after ruling himself out of taking on the manager's role, Steve Giles was also a part of the backroom staff. Shawbury United finished the season with a creditable 10th position, and also won the Powell Charity Cup against Mid Cheshire Div Two Side Whitchurch Alport.

After Andy Waters stepped down as Reserve team manager at the end of the 2011–12 season, Shawbury appointed Kevin Cooper as Reserve team manager with Shawbury player Eddie Knox his assistant. For the 2012–13 season they were members of the Mercian League Division 1.

In June 2012 Chris Kirkup was instated as the new chairman of the club. For the 2012–13 season Dave Richards remained as First Team Manager in a season that saw Shawbury return to FA Cup action for the first time since the 2009–10 season. Richards was at the helm when Shawbury's league fortunes took a turn for the better, culminating in the club winning the West Midlands League Premier Division title in 2015/16.

The club embarked on their first season in the Midland League Premier Division, and whilst garnering memorable wins against some of the stronger teams in the division, including a 5–1 thumping of FA Cup heroes Westfields, they were victorious on the final-day at Brocton, which condemned Walsall Wood to the drop instead of Shawbury and ensured the club finished in its highest-ever league position of 19th.

Shawbury suffered some off the field woes towards the end of the season, with them leaving their home of over twenty years, the Butler Sports Ground in Wem, and having to relocate to Ludlow Football Stadium, some 40 miles away. Shawbury were not in a position to be able to help pay for new floodlights on their rented ground, and due to the lights then having to be dismantled, had to find another suitable ground, with Ludlow being the only option for them to remain at Step 5.

The club found its second season at Step 5 challenging eventually finishing 21st, 9 points from safety, and were relegated back to the Midlands Regional Premer Division along with Shropshire neighbours Haughmond FC. Following relegation a vast number of the playing squad left the club to remain at Step 5. Joint Managers Dave Richards and Stu Lewis looked to rebuild a younger playing squad in their first season back at Step 6. The club introduced a new Youth Team competing in the Midland Floodlit Youth League in which numerous players were promoted to the first team.

On 13 April 2019, Joint Managers Dave Richards and Stu Lewis mutually agreed to leave their roles so Richards could concentrate on his duty as chairman and Lewis as new manager of a second youth team at the club. Subsequently, Lewis left to join WMRL Division One side Allscott Heath as manager the same summer.

On 17 May 2019, the club announced former A.F.C. Telford United Youth Head Coach, Declan Allen, as the new First Team manager. He was joined at the club by Sean Evans, after he left Whitchurch Alport following a brief spell there as coach. Their tenure got off to a good start drawing 0–0 with top four favourites Wolverhampton Casuals, who had finished third in the previous season before beating Worcester Raiders in their second game. The club went onto to reach the first round proper of the FA Vase for just the seventh time in the club's history before losing to Uttoxeter Town in a replay. After a good start, results slipped and the side went on a run of 10 games without a win. Luck changed following a 2–1 victory over former landlords, Wem Town, in January. The club having slipped to 3rd bottom went on a run which saw them pick up 3 wins and a draw from their next 6 games lifting them to 15th a just 5 points from a mid-table finish before the outbreak of COVID-19 cut the season short.

At the end of the 2020–21 season the club were transferred to Division One of the Midland League when the Premier Division of the West Midlands (Regional) League lost its status as a step six division.

== Ground ==
In 2017 after many years groundsharing with Wem Town at the Butler Sports Centre in Wem, around 6 miles from Shawbury, the club moved 'temporarily' to Ludlow after agreeing a groundshare agreement with Shropshire County League club Ludlow FC after Wem Town lost the use of their changing rooms, a requirement for the league. Ludlow Football Stadium has a small covered stand and floodlights as well as a viewing balcony. The ground is shared with Ludlow FC of the West Midlands (Regional) League Division Two, and has a 3G astro turf on the opposite side of the main stand. Despite the move to Ludlow being temporary, they are still playing at Ludlow (nearly 40 miles from Shawbury) as of 2023

In September 2014, the club submitted planning proposals to Shropshire Council for their new ground situated off of the A53. Planning permission was granted in December 2014. In January 2020 the club announced that land had been secured for the project following a donation from land owner Gerard Verdino. The club have signed a 99-year lease for the land. However, as of March 2022 not a single piece of work had started at the location, and the land was still being as farmland. The latest Google Street view of the location (dated March 2022) still shows a ploughed farmers field. On 21 May 2023, the club announced via Twitter that they had reached an agreement with EFL side Shrewsbury Town, allowing the club to play home games at the Community 4G pitch at New Meadow for the 2023–24 season, bringing the club closer to returning to Shawbury. The club eventually returned to the village in time for the 2024–25 season after the opening of the newly built Shawbury Community Sports Centre on Carradine Road.

== Honours ==
Shawbury have won a large number of local trophies, including the Shropshire County Challenge Cup, Shropshire Junior Cup, Commander Ethelston Cup, Powell Cup, John Davies Cup and Tim Stokes Cup. Shawbury have appeared in the Shropshire Premier Cup Final under its various guises, most notably winning the trophy in 2014. They also reached the final in 2017, losing out 1–0 in the final to Market Drayton Town. The biggest win was during pre-season 2017–18, when Shawbury beat Shrewsbury Town and TNS on their way to winning the Shropshire Senior Cup for the first time in their history.

== Club records ==
- Best league position: 19th in Midland Football League, Premier Division – Season 2016/17
- Best FA Cup performance: Extra Preliminary Round, 2008–09 & 2009–10
- Best FA Vase performance: Fourth Round, 2007–08

== See also ==
- Shropshire#Football

== Sources ==
- Shawbury United at the Football Club History Database
