= Ellesmere Rangers F.C. =

Association football club in England

Coordinates: 52°54′23.58″N 2°54′22.25″W

Ellesmere Rangers
- Full name: Ellesmere Rangers Football Club
- Nicknames: The Meresiders, The Rangers
- Founded: 1969
- Ground: Beech Grove, Ellesmere
- Chairman: Neil Williams
- League: Shropshire County League Premier Division
- 2024–25: Shropshire County League Premier Division, 11th of 15
Home colours	Away colours

Ellesmere Rangers Football Club is a football club based in Ellesmere, Shropshire, England. They are currently members of the Shropshire County League Premier Division and play at Beech Grove.

== History ==
The club was established in 1969 following a meeting in the Railway pub, and were initially known as Railway Rangers. They joined the Oswestry & District League and were initially managed by a committee. In 1974 the club was renamed Ellesmere Rangers. They were promoted to the Shrewsbury & West Shropshire League at the end of the 1974–75 season. In 1980–81 the club won the Shropshire Junior Cup with a 2–1 win over Weston United in the final at Gay Meadow.

During the 1980s Ellesmere moved up to the Shropshire County League. They won the league in 2003–04, earning promotion to Division Two of the West Midlands (Regional) League. After finishing fourth in Division Two in their first season in the league, the club were promoted to Division One. They went on to win Division One in 2005–06 and were promoted to the Premier Division. In 2009–10 the club were Premier Division champions, securing promotion to the Midland Alliance. They also won the Shropshire Challenge Cup after beating Market Drayton Town in the final at the New Meadow.

After finishing bottom of the Midland Alliance in 2012–13, Ellesmere were relegated back to the Premier Division of the West Midlands (Regional) League. The following season saw the club win the Shropshire Premier Cup with a 4–2 win over AFC Bridgnorth in the final. At the end of the 2017–18 season, the club were transferred to Division One South of the North West Counties League.

In June 2023 Ellesmere resigned from the North West Counties League citing the unavailability of a suitable managerial team and financial concerns, dropping into the Premier Division of the Shropshire County League.

== Ground ==
The club initially played at a field in nearby Newton, which was donated to the club by President Mike Edwards. They later moved to the Beech Grove ground in Ellesmere.

== Honours ==
- West Midlands (Regional) League
  - Premier Division champions 2009–10
  - Division One champions 2005–06
- Shropshire County League
  - Champions 2003–04
- Shropshire Challenge Cup
  - Winners 2009–10
- Shropshire Junior Cup
  - Winners 1980–81

== Records ==
- Best FA Cup performance: First qualifying round, 2008–09
- Best FA Vase performance: Second round, 2011–12
- Record attendance: 250 vs Ludlow Town, 2005–06 (an FA Youth Cup tie against Port Vale on 6 November 2014 had an attendance of 347)

== See also ==
- Ellesmere Rangers F.C. players
