= Shropshire County Football League =

Association football league in England

- Founded: 2020
- Country: England
- Number of clubs: Premier Division: 16; Division 1: 18
- Level on pyramid: Level 11 (Premier Division)
- Promotion to: Midland League Division One; North West Counties League Division One South; Hellenic League Division One (not automatic)
- Current champions: Premier Division: Shrewsbury Up & Comers; Division 1: NC United Development

The Shropshire County Football League, currently known as the TJ Vickers and friends Football League for sponsorship reasons, is an English football league. The league has two divisions, which stand at levels 11 and 12 of the English football league system.

Teams can be promoted from the division to either Division One of the Midland League or Division One South of the North West Counties League. However, this is not automatic and clubs are required to apply for promotion.

== History ==
The League was founded in 2020. The league's inaugural season, the 2020–21 season, was curtailed due to the COVID-19 pandemic.

== Current members ==
=== Premier Division ===
Locations of the 2025/26 Shropshire County Football League Premier Division teams

Club	Location	Home ground	Home colours	24/25
Bridgnorth Spartans	Bridgnorth	Cheswardine Lane, Norton		7th
Church Stretton Town	Church Stretton	Russells Meadow		2nd
Dawley Town	Dawley	Doseley Road		5th
Ellesmere Rangers	Ellesmere	Beech Grove		11th
FC Nations	Shrewsbury	Shrewsbury Sports Village		N/A
Gobowen Celtic	Gobowen	Gobowen Recreation Ground		8th
Llanymynech	Llanymynech	Llanymynech Village Hall		2nd (Div 1)
NC United	Wellington	Tolkien Way		10th
Prees United	Prees	Prees Cricket and Recreation Ground		4th (Div 1)
Shifnal Town 1964	Shifnal	Acoustafoam Stadium		N/A
Shrewsbury Juniors	Shrewsbury	Shrewsbury Sports Village		15th
Shrewsbury Up & Comers	Shrewsbury	London Road Sports Centre		1st
Telford Town Reserves	Telford	Ketley Bank Playing Fields		12th
Wem Town	Wem	Butler Sports Centre		14th
Whitchurch Alport 1946	Whitchurch	Yockings Park		9th
Wrockwardine Wood	Wrockwardine Wood	Telford College		3rd

Team changes
Ahead of the 2025–26 season:

- Haughmond were promoted to the North West Counties League Division One South
- Morda United left
- Newport Town left
- Llanymynech were promoted from Division One
- Prees United were promoted from Division One
- Shifnal Town 1964 joined
- FC Nations joined

=== Division One ===
Club	Location	Home Ground
AFC Weston Rhyn	Weston Rhyn	Weston Rhyn Community Centre
Allscott Heath Reserves	Allscott	Allscott Sports & Social Club
Brown Clee	Cleobury North	Hall Meadow
Ercall 1975	Telford	Oakengates Leisure Centre
Ercall Colts	Telford	Telford Snowboard & Ski Centre
Ercall Evolution	Telford	Oakengates Leisure Centre
Ercall Rangers	Telford	Telford Snowboard & Ski Centre
Ercall Aces	Telford	Telford College
FC Nations Development	Shrewsbury	Shrewsbury Sports Village
Haughmond Development	Shrewsbury	Shrewsbury Sports Village
Mereside Rangers	Shrewsbury	London Road Sports Centre
SAHA FC	Shrewsbury	Hanwood Recreation Ground
Shawbury United Development	Shawbury	Carradine Road
Shrewsbury Up & Comers Development	Shrewsbury	Salop Unison Club
St Martins	St Martins	St Martins Playing Field
Telford Town Development	Telford	Ketley Bank Playing Fields
Wem Town Colts	Wem	Butler Sports Centre
Wrockwardine Wood Development	Wrockwardine Wood	Oakengates Leisure Centre
