= Halewood Apollo F.C. =

Association football club in England

Halewood Apollo
- Full name: Halewood Apollo Football Club
- Founded: 2014
- Ground: Volair Halewood
- Chairman: Joseph Stocks
- Manager: Michael Johnston
- League: North West Counties League Division One North
- 2025–26: Liverpool County Premier League Premier Division, 5th of 14 (promoted)
Home colours	Away colours

Halewood Apollo Football Club is a football club based in Halewood, Merseyside, England. They are currently members of the North West Counties League Division One North.

== History ==
Halewood Apollo F.C. were established in 2014, and spent a few years in the Warrington & District League. They moved to the Liverpool County Premier League for the start of the 2020–21 season. Although they finished fifth out of fourteen in 2025–26, their application to join the North West Counties League for the 2026–27 season was accepted.

In 2026, the club was admitted into the North West Counties League Division One North.
