= Fulwood Amateurs A.F.C. =

Association football club in England

- Full name: Fulwood Amateurs Association Football Club
- Founded: 1924
- Ground: Lightfoot Lane
- League: North West Counties League Division One North
- 2024–25: West Lancashire League Premier Division, 4th of 15 (promoted)

Fulwood Amateurs A.F.C. is a football club based in Fulwood, Preston, England. They are currently members of the North West Counties Division One North, having won promotion to it from the West Lancashire League in 2025.

== History ==
Founded in 1924, Fulwood Amateurs spent 64 years in the Lancashire Amateur League from 1928 to 1992, winning it in 1939 and spending time in its First, Second and Third divisions. A notable club captain in this time was Joe Finney, brother of England international and Preston North End star Tom Finney. In the early 1980s they moved to their current ground of Lightfoot Lane, located next to that of Preston Grasshoppers rugby union team.

From 1992 they competed in the West Lancashire League. They won immediate promotions to reach the First Division in 1994, spending all but one of the following 20 seasons in the top tier, which was renamed the Premier Division in 1998. They won the top tier three times, in 1995, 1999 and 2019. They moved on from the West Lancs league in 2025, applying for and winning promotion to the North West Counties.

== Ground ==
Their ground at Lightfoot Lane was opened by Tom Finney in 1981. Somewhat unusually, it is used both as a football pitch and a driving range for golf.

== Records ==
- Best FA Vase performance: Third round, 2025–26

== Honours ==
- West Lancashire League Premier Division
  - Winnners 1994-95, 1998-99, 2018-19
  - Runners-Up 2009-10, 2021-22
- Lancashire Amateur League First Division
  - Winners 1937-38, 1970-71
- Lancashire Football Association Amateur Shield
  - Winnners 1997-98, 1998-99, 2017-18, 2021-22, 2023-24
