= Cleobury North =

Village in Shropshire, England

Coordinates: 52.477°N 2.556°W

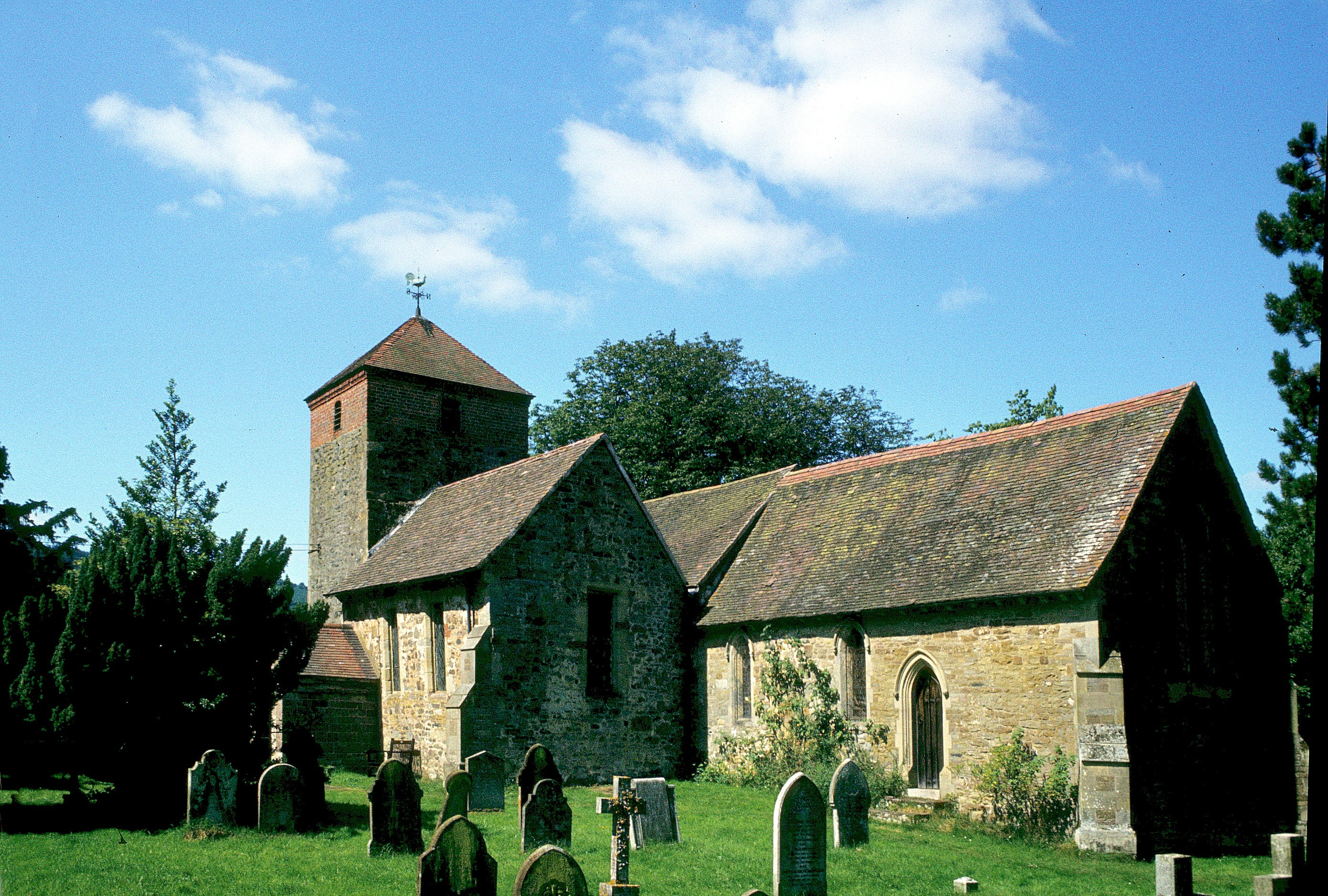
- St Peter & St Paul Church, Cleobury North

- Location within Shropshire
- Population: 87
- OS grid reference: SO622867
- Civil parish: Cleobury North
- Unitary authority: Shropshire
- Ceremonial county: Shropshire
- Region: West Midlands
- Country: England
- Sovereign state: United Kingdom
- Post town: Bridgnorth
- Postcode district: WV16
- Dialling code: 01746
- Police: West Mercia
- Fire: Shropshire
- Ambulance: West Midlands
- UK Parliament: Ludlow

Cleobury North is a civil parish and small village in south east Shropshire, England. It is situated on the B4364 southwest of the market town of Bridgnorth. To the north is the village of Ditton Priors and to the west is Brown Clee Hill, the county's highest hill.

== The Village ==
Cleobury North is a parish along the River Rea, under the Clee Hills and is 8 miles S.W of Bridgnorth.

St. Peter and St Paul's church dates back to the late 12th century, which is a Grade II* listed building (Listing NGR: SO6232087002). Grade II* buildings are of particular special interest with only 5.5% listed as Grade II* in England.

The local bus services are 141 and 143 runs through Cleobury North from Bridgnorth to Ludlow along the B4364, Monday-Saturday. The nearest railway station to Cleobury North is the Ludlow railway station which is 9.97 miles away.

== History ==
Domesday Book The Domesday Book was a survey for William I which showed who owned what, how much everything was worth and how much the King was owed in tax and rent. The survey showed that Cleobury North had a total population of 9 households with only 2.5 geld of taxable units. The value in 1066 was £0.60 and increased in 1086 to £1, the amount was extremely low as the village only consisted of 4 villagers, 4 smallholders and 1 slave.

Hearth Tax The Hearth Tax was introduced in England in 1662. Records of the Hearth Tax in Cleobury North date back to 1672 which was calculated on the number of fireplaces in a family unit. The records show that 26 households paid in Cleobury North (e.g. Hercules Hide, David Jones and Richard Hudson) and 3 were illegible (Nicholas Millichopp, Thomas Kindsley Esq. and Robert Grove).

Population change Cleobury North had a population of 136 residents in 1801, which increased to 250 in 1911. In 1911 it was at a record high but dwellers started to decrease and ended up with 110 in 1961. The 2011 census population is 87 people which shows it has declined overall throughout the years and has a net negative correlation.

Occupation History During the year of 1831 the highest sector of employment in males 20 years and over was agricultural labour with 20 residents. This was over 44% of the parish males. Other occupation included retail, handicraft and non-agricultural labour with 7 males, and no males were in manufacturing.

== Activities ==
Burwarton Show- The Burwarton show is a one-day agricultural show which attracts over 20,000 visitors each year on the first Thursday in August between 8:15am-7pm. Activities include sheep ring, fleece competition and sheep shearing competition. The annual dance which starts the show brought in £8,000 in 2011 which raises money for charities which include the Air Ambulance, Nightingale Nurses and Breast Cancer.

Football- Brown Clee FC are a football club based in the village, who currently play in Division One of the Shropshire County Football League. They play their home games at the Hall Meadow football field. The grounds of several teams in the league, most notably Brown Clee, were featured in David Bauckham's book Dugouts, which noted the high frequency of dugouts with lockable doors which are also used for storage, a feature seemingly unique to clubs in Shropshire.

== Census ==
At the 2011 census, the village was included in the Burwarton civil parish.

== See also ==
- Listed buildings in Cleobury North
- Cleobury Mortimer
