= West Cheshire Association Football League =

Association football league in England

- Founded: 1892
- Country: England
- Divisions: Division One; Division Two; Division Three; Youth Division
- Number of clubs: 45
- Level on pyramid: Level 11 (Division One)
- Feeder to: North West Counties League
- Promotion to: North West Counties League
- Relegation to: None
- Domestic cup(s): Pyke Cup; West Cheshire Bowl; West Cheshire Shield; Youth Plate
- Current champions: Helsby (2025–26)

The West Cheshire Association Football League (commonly known as the West Cheshire League) is an English football league in the county of Cheshire, which also includes teams from Merseyside. Its current principal sponsor is Carlsberg, also sponsor of the South West Peninsula League. It has a Division One, Division Two and Division Three. Division One sits at step 7 (or level 11) of the National League System.

The top five teams may be eligible for promotion to the North West Counties Football League Division One. After several triumphs in Division One, Cammell Laird was promoted to the North West Counties League in 2004, and its reserve team, which had won Division Two, was promoted to Division One. It was the only team since Vauxhall Motors to be promoted from the league, until Runcorn Town was promoted in 2010. In 2014, Vauxhall Motors returned to the league.

The league also runs cup competitions.

== 2025–26 member clubs ==
=== Division One ===
- AFC Knowsley
- Aintree Villa
- Capenhurst Villa
- Chester Nomads
- Ellesmere Port Town
- FC Bootle
- FC Kirkby
- Helsby
- Heswall
- Litherland REMYCA (reserves)
- Mallaby
- Marshalls
- Mossley Hill Athletic
- Newton
- Rainhill Town
- South Liverpool (reserves)

=== Division Two ===
- AFC Knowsley (under-23s)
- Cammell Laird 1907 (reserves)
- Chester Nomads (reserves)
- Great Sutton
- Higher Bebington Kelma
- Hooton
- Maghull (reserves)
- Mossley Hill Athletic (reserves)
- Neston Nomads
- Runcorn Sports
- Sefton Park Rangers
- Sutton Rangers
- Vauxhall Motors (reserves)
- West Kirby

=== Division Three ===
- Athletico Blues
- Blacon Youth Club
- Capenhurst Villa (reserves)
- Christleton
- Ellesmere Port Town (under-23s)
- Helsby (under-23s)
- Heswall (under-23s)
- Kelsall
- Litherland Athletic
- Marine Academy
- Moreton
- Neston Nomads (under-23s)
- Rainhill Town (reserves)
- West Kirby (reserves)

== Divisional champions ==
=== 1890s ===
Season	Division One	Division Two	Division Three
1892–93	Ellesmere Port	N/A	N/A
1893–94	LNW Locomotives	Cleveland Athletic	N/A
1894–95	Port Sunlight	LNW Locomotives reserves	N/A
1895–96	Ellesmere Port	Seacombe Swifts	N/A
1896–97	Garston Copper Works	Melrose reserves	N/A
1897–98	Buckley Town	Ellesmere Port	N/A
1898–99	Flint Town	Ellesmere Port	N/A
1899–1900	New Brighton Tower reserves	Wirral Railway reserves	Victoria Swifts

=== 1900s ===
Season	Division One	Division Two	Division Three
1900–01	Wheatlands	St. Nanthaniels	Britannia reserves
1901–02	Wheatlands	Wallasey Village	Rake Lane PSA
1902–03	West Kirby	Birkenhead North End	Moreton
1903–04	Ellesmere Port	Wallasey Village	N/A
1904–05	Wrexham Victoria	Rock Ferry	N/A
1905–06	Garston Gasworks	Tranmere Rovers reserves	N/A
1906–07	Harrowby	Heswall	N/A
1907–08	African Royal	Hoylake	N/A
1908–09	African Royal	Burnell Ironworks	N/A
1909–10	Hoylake	Bebington St. Andrews	N/A

=== 1910s ===
Season	Division One	Division Two	Division Three
1910–11	Hoylake	Domininion	N/A
1911–12	Hoylake	Wallasey Rovers	N/A
1912–13	Harrowby	Prescot Nomads	N/A
1913–14	Garston Gasworks	Hoylake Trinity	N/A
1914–15	Harrowby*	?	N/A
1915–16	No competition – WW1	No competition – WW1	N/A
1916–17	No competition – WW1	No competition – WW1	N/A
1917–18	No competition – WW1	No competition – WW1	N/A
1918–19	No competition – WW1	No competition – WW1	N/A
1919–20	Harrowby	?	N/A

=== 1920s ===
No known league tables found although it is believed that the competition did operate in the period.

=== 1930s ===
No known league tables found although it is believed that the competition did operate in the period.

=== 1940s ===
All football competitions were suspended in for the seasons from 1940–41 to 1945–46 due to the Second World War.

Season	Division One	Division Two	Division Three
1946–47	Port Sunlight	N/A	N/A
1947–48	Stork	Port Sunlight reserves	N/A
1948–49	Stork	Bromborough	N/A
1949–50	Newton	Eastham Athletic	N/A

=== 1950s ===
Season	Division One	Division Two	Division Three
1950–51	Port Sunlight	McAlpines	N/A
1951–52	Bromborough	Port Sunlight reserves	N/A
1952–53	Birkenhead Docks	Hoylake Athletic reserves	N/A
1953–54	Everton 'C'	Upton	N/A
1954–55	Everton 'C'	Upton	N/A
1955–56	Newton	Ashville	N/A
1956–57	Stork	Newton reserves	N/A
1957–58	Ellesmere Port Town reserves	Cammell Laird	N/A
1958–59	Stork	Cammell Laird	N/A
1959–60	New Brighton reserves	Hoylake Athletic	N/A

=== 1960s ===
Season	Division One	Division Two	Division Three
1960–61	Newton	Bromborough Pool	N/A
1961–62	Newton	Newton reserves	N/A
1962–63	Stork	Newton reserves	N/A
1963–64	West Kirby	Newton reserves	N/A
1964–65	West Kirby	Chester College	N/A
1965–66	Harrowby	Shell	N/A
1966–67	Poulton Victoria	Christleton	N/A
1967–68	Ashville	Bromborough	N/A
1968–69	Cammell Laird	Heswall	N/A
1969–70	Christleton	Harrowby	N/A

=== 1970s ===
Season	Division One	Division Two	Division Three
1970–71	Cammell Laird	Harrowby	N/A
1971–72	Poulton Victoria	Willaston	N/A
1972–73	Port Sunlight	Cammell Laird reserves	N/A
1973–74	Port Sunlight	Cadburys	N/A
1974–75	Cammell Laird	Port Sunlight reserves	N/A
1975–76	Cammell Laird	Poulton Victoria reserves	N/A
1976–77	Cammell Laird	Poulton Victoria reserves	N/A
1977–78	Cammell Laird	Poulton Victoria reserves	N/A
1978–79	Cammell Laird	Hoylake Athletic	
1979–80	Poulton Victoria	Hoylake Athletic	N/A

=== 1980s ===
Season	Division One	Division Two	Division Three
1980–81	Cammell Laird	Hoylake Athletic	N/A
1981–82	Cammell Laird	Poulton Victoria reserves	N/A
1982–83	Cammell Laird	Mersey Royal	N/A
1983–84	Cammell Laird	Mersey Royal	N/A
1984–85	Heswall	Cammell Laird reserves	N/A
1985–86	Vauxhall Motors	Merseyside Police	N/A
1986–87	Cammell Laird	Rivacre Sports & Social	N/A
1987–88	Heswall	Higher Bebington	N/A
1988–89	Cammell Laird	Higher Bebington	N/A
1989–90	Cammell Laird	Heswall Reserves	N/A

=== 1990s ===
Season	Division One	Division Two	Division Three
1990–91	Cammell Laird	Heswall reserves	N/A
1991–92	Cammell Laird	Poulton Victoria reserves	N/A
1992–93	Christleton	Cammell Laird reserves	N/A
1993–94	Cammell Laird	Cammell Laird reserves	N/A
1994–95	Vauxhall Motors	Vauxhall Motors reserves	N/A
1995–96	Poulton Victoria	Poulton Victoria reserves	N/A
1996–97	Poulton Victoria	Heswall reserves	N/A
1997–98	Poulton Victoria	General Chemicals	N/A
1998–99	Cammell Laird	Heswall reserves	BICC Helsby
1999–2000	Poulton Victoria	BICC Helsby	Pavilions

=== 2000s ===
Season	Division One	Division Two	Division Three
2000–01	Cammell Laird	Aintree Villa	Mallaby
2001–02	Christleton	Mallaby	Maghull reserves
2002–03	Vauxhall Motors reserves	Poulton Victoria reserves	Ashville reserves
2003–04	Newton	Merseyside Police	MANWEB reserves
2004–05	Heswall	New Brighton	Mond Rangers reserves
2005–06	Poulton Victoria	Upton Athletic Association	West Kirby reserves
2006–07	West Kirby	Runcorn Town	AFC Bebington Athletic
2007–08	West Kirby	Poulton Victoria reserves	Mossley Hill Athletic
2008–09	West Kirby	Helsby	FC Pensby
2009–10	Cammell Laird reserves	Southport Trinity	Hale

=== 2010s ===
Season	Division One	Division Two	Division Three
2010–11	West Kirby	Ashville	Runcorn Linnets reserves
2011–12	Ashville	Hale	South Liverpool
2012–13	Heswall	South Liverpool	Marshalls reserves
2013–14	Maghull	Capenhurst Villa	Rainhill Town
2014–15	South Liverpool	Rainhill Town	Kirkby Town Railway
2015–16	South Liverpool	Richmond Raith Rovers	Bootle reserves
2016–17	Newton	Ashville	Rainhill Town reserves
2017–18	South Liverpool	Hale	Page Celtic
2018–19	Newton	Page Celtic	Aintree Villa
2019–20			

=== 2020s ===
Season	Division One	Division Two	Division Three
2020–21	Season cancelled – Covid pandemic	Season cancelled – Covid pandemic	Season cancelled – Covid pandemic
2021–22	Mersey Royal	Marine U23s	Sutton Athletic
2022–23	Mersey Royal	Helsby	Aintree Villa Res
2023–24	Mossley Hill Athletic	South Liverpool Res	Cammell Laird 1907 Res
2024–25	Mossley Hill Athletic	FC Kirkby	Sutton Rangers
2025–26	Helsby	Cammell Laird 1907 Res	Moreton

Sources FA Full-Time, Non League Matters
