= Wem Town F.C. =

English semi-professional association football club

Coordinates: 52°51′26.8″N 2°43′35.9″W

Wem Town
- Full name: Wem Town Football Club
- Nickname: Wemians
- Founded: 1883
- Ground: Butler Sports Centre, Wem
- Chairman: James Gwilliam
- Manager: Paul Rawlings
- League: Shropshire County League Premier Division
- 2024–25: Shropshire County League Premier Division, 14th of 15
Home colours

Wem Town Football Club is a football club based in the market town of Wem, Shropshire, England. They are currently members of the Shropshire County League Premier Division and play at the Butler Sports Centre.

== History ==
The club was formed in 1883.

For the 1989–90 season, they joined the West Midlands (Regional) League Division Two, and in their first season in the division, won promotion to Division One. This is where they remained until 1995, when they left the league. In 2009–10, they rejoined the West Midlands (Regional) League, after winning the Shropshire County League. During this season, they finished Division Two runners-up and were awarded promotion back to Division One. They then spent nine seasons in Division One, before being crowned Division One champions at the end of the 2017–18 season.

Ahead of the 2020–21 season, the club were transferred to Division One South of the North West Counties League as the West Midlands (Regional) League lost its Premier Division as part of National League System's restructure. However, the club withdrew from the league, and were instead placed in the Premier Division of the Shropshire County League.

== Honours ==
- Shropshire County League
  - Champions 2008–09
- West Midlands (Regional) League
  - Division One champions 2017–18

== Records ==
- Best FA Vase performance: Second qualifying round, 2018–19
