= Market Drayton Town F.C. =

Association football club in England

Coordinates: 52°54′35.82″N 2°29′46.61″W

Market Drayton Town
- Full name: Market Drayton Town Football Club
- Nickname: The Gingerbread Men
- Founded: 1969
- Ground: Greenfields Sports Ground, Market Drayton
- Chairman: Simon Line
- Manager: David Lloyd
- League: North West Counties League Division One South
- 2025–26: North West Counties League Division One South, 17th of 18
Home colours	Away colours

Market Drayton Town Football Club is a football club based in Market Drayton, Shropshire, England. They are currently members of the North West Counties League Division One South and play at the Greenfields Sports Ground.

== History ==
The club was established in 1969 as Little Drayton Rangers. They became members of the Shropshire County League and were champions in 1991–92, also winning the Shropshire Premier Cup. In 1998 they joined Division One North of the West Midlands (Regional) League. They were runners-up in their first season in the division, only missing out on the title after having three points deducted, and were promoted to the Premier Division.

In 2000–01 Little Drayton won the Premier Cup again and went on to retain it the following season. In 2003 the club was renamed Market Drayton Town, the name of a former club that had won the Shropshire County League in 1955–56. They won the Premier Cup again in 2003–04 and retained it in each of the next two seasons. After finishing as runners-up in the Premier Division in 2004–05, the club were champions the following season, securing promotion to the Midland Alliance.

The 2008–09 season saw Market Drayton win the Midland Alliance, resulting in promotion to Division One South of the Northern Premier League. They won the Premier Cup again in 2010–11 and 2015–16. In 2021–22 the club finished bottom of Division One West and were relegated to the Premier Division of the Midland League. They finished bottom of the Premier Division the following season and were relegated to Division One South of the North West Counties League. The club subsequently finished bottom of Division One South in 2023–24 but there was no relegation from the league. In 2024–25 they finished ninth, their first season not finishing bottom since the 2020–21 season.

== Honours ==
- West Midlands (Regional) League
  - Premier Division champions 2005–06
- Midland Alliance
  - Champions 2008–09
  - League Cup winners 2008–09
- Shropshire Premier Cup
  - Winners 1991–92, 2003–04, 2004–05, 2005–06, 2010–11, 2015–16

== Records ==
- Best FA Cup performance: Second qualifying round, 2007–08, 2010–11
- Best FA Trophy performance: First qualifying round, 2010–11, 2014–15, 2015–16
- Best FA Vase performance: Fifth Round, 2008–09
- Record attendance: 440 vs AFC Telford United, friendly, 11 June 2009

== See also ==
- Market Drayton Town F.C. players
- Market Drayton Town F.C. managers
