= Allscott Heath F.C. =

Football club based in Allscott, England

Coordinates: 52°42′36.9″N 2°35′14.38″W

Allscott Heath
- Full name: Allscott Heath Football Club
- Nickname: The Monners
- Founded: 2010; 16 years ago
- Ground: Allscott Sports & Social Club, Allscott
- Chairman: Thomas Ford
- League: North West Counties League Division One South
- 2024–25: North West Counties League Division One South, 15th of 18
Home colours

Allscott Heath Football Club is a football club based in Allscott, Shropshire, England. They are currently members of the North West Counties League Division One South, and play at Allscott Sports & Social Club, Allscott.

== History ==
Allscott Heath were formed as Atlas in 2010, joining the Shropshire County League. In 2011, the club changed their name to Allscott, remaining in the league. In 2016, after a spell in the Mercian Regional League, Allscott joined the West Midlands (Regional) League, gaining promotion to Division One a year later. In 2019, the club renamed themselves to Allscott Heath. In 2023, the club was admitted into the Midland League Division One.

== Ground ==
The club currently play at Allscott Sports & Social Club in Allscott.

== Records ==
- Best FA Vase performance: First round, 2024–25
