= Shifnal Festival 2011 =

The 2011 Shifnal Festival ran from Tuesday 13 September to Sunday 25 September.

== Overview ==
Organisers decided to increase the remit of the festival for the 2011 season. After low turnout and some financial losses, more expensive but less well-attended events were scrapped, such as the talent contest and many of the workshops. In addition, the festival attempted to gain new audiences by putting on events targeted at all age ranges.

For the 2011 festival, Taylor Wimpey were confirmed as the primary sponsor, along with a number of local businesses who sponsored individual events or parts of the advertising campaign. In addition, festival organisers hosted a number of fundraising events including a music quiz and a concert with folk and blues artists Cuckoo Oak and O.D Slope.

As well as the events organised by the festival committee, local businesses were prompted to participate and many local pubs arranged their own fringe events during the festival period, which received promotion on the official billing.

== Events ==
=== Comedy ===
It was announced at the Shifnal Carnival that comedian Ken Dodd was confirmed to open the festival with a stand-up show on Tuesday 13 September. Dodd played in Shifnal as a favour to former festival chairman Tony Stringfellow who had made props, including Dodd's Diddy Men, over the past 20 years.

=== Art ===
After the success of the 2010 art exhibition, two more focused exhibitions were opened during the September festival. ‘’'Famous Faces'’’, was an interactive exhibit where the public were asked to match portraits artistically created or crafted by local artists, with an interview of a famous Shifnal face. The second exhibit was the ‘’'Gardens Gallery'’’ where local artists were asked to produce pieces that incorporated images of local gardens or garden produce. Sit-in open days were organised in the summer of 2011 at Shifnal Sensory Garden and Cosford Grange.

=== Dance ===
A traditional Gaelic Ceilidh on 17 September featured band One Short including Flos Headford of the Old Swan Band, Chris "Yorkie" Bartram of All Backed Up and John Percy. The caller was confirmed as Dave Hunt in June 2011.

The weekly Tea Dance was incorporated into the official program.

Ceroc delivered instructed dance and jazz on Monday 19 September.

The local folk dance group agreed to allow new members to join them for free as part of the festival billing on Wednesday 21 September.

=== Performing arts ===
As a result of the Shifnal Festival 2010 the Shifnal Theatrical and Repertory Society (STARS) was formed. STARS opening performance, on Wednesday 14 September at Idsall School, was Alan Ayckbourn's comedy Confusions.

=== Photography ===
The theme for the 2011 competition and exhibition was "Shifnal in the four seasons". Over 100 photographs were entered by local artists and judging took place in early September. Similar to the art exhibition in 2010, the 2011 photography competition took the form of a trail around the town with entries being displayed in the windows of local businesses.

=== Literature ===
It was confirmed in early June 2011 that BBC Radio 3 presenter and poet Ian McMillan along with cartoonist Tony Husband would be bringing their show "A Cartoon History of Here" to the town in a one-off performance. The show took place on Wednesday 21 September at Shifnal Village Hall.

=== Crafts ===
Craft workshops were planned on the first weekend of the festival as well as a craft fair on the closing weekend. Further details have not been confirmed.

=== Film ===
The monthly "Flicks in the Sticks" shown at the Village Hall presented "Inspector Drake: The Movie" as part of the festival's fringe events. Inspector Drake was chosen as part of the official selection at the BFI London Film Festival, and was chosen by public vote at the screening of Black Swan in May.

=== Spirituality ===
Two events embraced spirituality within the festival. The first, entitled "Singing with the Spirit" saw local choir groups perform at St Andrews Church on Wednesday 21 September. It was anticipated that the venue would be filled by parents and relatives which prompted the festival committee not to release tickets to the general public. The second event entitled "O Sing Unto the Lord" saw local professional choirs take centre stage at St Andrews Church in a night of spiritual choral singing. The event took place on Thursday 22 September. A "Festival Thanksgiving" service brought the festival to a close on the final Sunday.

=== Music ===
Over the course of the 13 days of the festival, a number of musical events took place:

- Lunchtime Concerts from Tuesday 20 September to Thursday 22 September. Concerts took a classical form with vocal performances and instrumental sets. Local people were encouraged to perform.
- The Fabulous Bordellos played the Wheatsheaf Pub on Saturday 17 September in a fringe event.
- A "Closing Party" was on the final Saturday of the festival and featured local bands: Lynus, Fake Obsession and Son of Zebedee as well as a DJ and other entertainment.
- Additional open-air concerts during the Farmers Market were also organised to provide a performance platform for local artists.

=== Additional events ===
A number of fringe events were planned by local businesses and pubs over the 13 days of the festival.

- Open Mic at The Wheatsheaf Pub.
- Open Mic at Jaspers Pub.
- A pub quiz at The Wheatsheaf Pub.

A family fun day was planned to coincide with the craft fair on the first Saturday of the festival. A bouncy castle and bouncy slide were confirmed along with other children's activities.
