= Shifnal Festival 2010 =

The 2010 Shifnal Festival ran from Friday 17 September to Sunday 26 September 2010, and hosted a number of musical, artistic and cultural events at a number of locations around the town. The organising committee was chaired by Tony Stringfellow.

== 2010 events ==
=== Workshops ===
Throughout the festival a number of workshops were held. These included:
Children's Barn Dance
Morris Dancing
Chinese Dance
Arabic Belly Dancing
Appalachian Step Dance
Street Dance
Salsa
Jive
Ceilidh Dancing
Felt making
Clay figure sculpting
Art
Sugar Craft

=== Film ===
"Flick in the Sticks" was the first major event of the festival. The event included locally made films shot in the town, or by residents of the town. Other films included Waiting in Rhyme starring John Alderton and Les Dennis and Expresso starring Norman Wisdom.

=== Poetry ===
"The Poetry Train" was a night of poetry readings conducted by local and international poets. These included: Olugbala Kokumo, Dreadlockalien, SPOZ, Simon Pitt, Fatima Al Matar, Rattan Reehal, Stephen Morris and Tony Stringfellow.

=== Art ===
During the festival, the town became an Art Gallery as artwork produced by local artists was displayed in the windows of local businesses to form an art trail. Larger exhibitions were set up in St Andrew's Church, Trinity Methodist Church and the Old Fire Station.
A photographic exhibition was also established.

=== Music ===
A number of music events were staged throughout the week. These included a performance called "Little Big Time Band" by the City of Birmingham Symphony Orchestra and local choir groups from in and around the town.

=== Shifnal Talent Search ===
A talent show was also held, with Vix, lead singer of 1980s pop-punk band Fuzzbox (We've Got a Fuzzbox and We're Gonna Use It) sitting on the judging panel. The winners, local band Fake Obsession, were given a slot in the festival's Grand Finale.

=== Grand Finale ===
The Grand Finale of the festival was held on Saturday 25 September 2010 at Idsall School. It featured music from:
Talent show winners, Fake Obsession,
Will Morgan,
Lynus,
The Band of Locals,
Beaver,
and headline act: Fuzzbox (We've Got a Fuzzbox and We're Gonna Use It)
