= Haughton Hall =

18th-century country house in Shifnal, Shropshire, England

Coordinates: 52.6725°N 2.3839°W

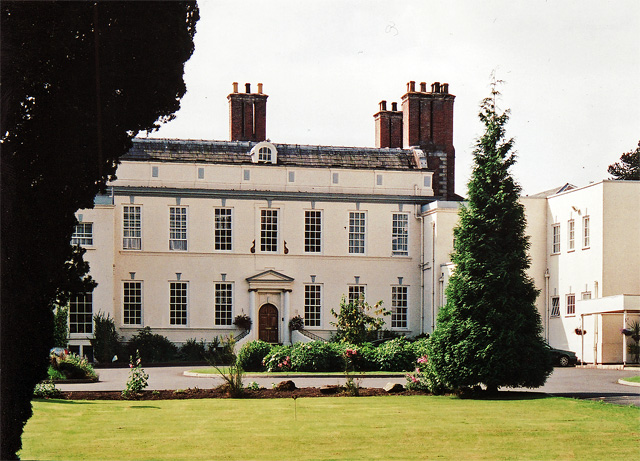
Haughton Hall

Haughton Hall is an early 18th-century country house situated at Haughton Lane, Shifnal, Shropshire, England now converted for use as a hotel. It is a Grade II* listed building.

The de Haughton family owned land at Haughton under the Lord of the Manor of Shifnal as early as 1185. The estate passed to Sir John Charlton early in the 14th century and by the marriage of a Charlton heiress to Richard Moreton in the early 16th century. The Moreton heiress Anne married Humphrey Brigges of Ernestry in 1587 and the Briggs Baronets occupied the estate until the death of the 5th and last Baronet in 1767.

The present house was built in 1718 by Sir Humphrey Briggs, 4th Baronet, MP for Wenlock, originally in red brick, with two storeys and attics and a seven bay frontage. After 1767 the estate was divided between among daughters and the Hall passed to George Townsend Brooke, son of Elizabeth Briggs. He improved and enlarged the house between 1820–30; the external walls were stuccoed and two two-storey flanking wings were added.

Following the death of Major William John Brooke (born 1875), of the King's Shropshire Light Infantry (he was killed during the Battle of Estaires on 9 April 1918 whilst attached to the Middlesex Regiment in the First World War), the property passed to a nephew and was thereafter let out for various uses, including briefly a school. Latterly it has been converted to a hotel.

The famous thoroughbred racehorse Gimcrack was buried at the Hall. A brick and stone pillar marks his grave to the west of the old walled garden.

== See also ==
- Grade II* listed buildings in Shropshire Council (H–Z)
- Listed buildings in Shifnal
- Basil Brooke (Royal Navy officer)
