= Basil Brooke =

Basil Brooke may refer to:

- Basil Brooke (Leicestershire MP) (died 1612), English MP for Leicestershire, 1607
- Basil Brooke (metallurgist) (1576–1646), English ironmaster and metallurgist
- Basil Brooke (Royal Navy officer, born 1882) (1882–1929), Royal Navy officer
- Basil Brooke, 1st Viscount Brookeborough (1888–1973), former Prime Minister of Northern Ireland
- Basil Brooke (Royal Navy officer, born 1895) (1895–1983), Royal Navy admiral and English cricketer
