= Andy Johnson (cricketer) =

English cricketer (born 1964)

Personal information
- Full name: Andrew Neil Johnson
- Born: 30 August 1964 (age 62); Wolverhampton, Staffordshire, England
- Batting: Right-handed

Domestic team information
- Years: Team
- 1987–2003: Shropshire

Career statistics
Competition	List A
Matches	8
Runs scored	121
Batting average	17.28
100s/50s	–/1
Top score	62
Balls bowled	36
Wickets	–
Bowling average	–
5 wickets in innings	–
10 wickets in match	–
Best bowling	–
Catches/stumpings	3/–
- Source: Cricinfo, 3 July 2011

Andrew Neil Johnson (born 30 August 1964) is a former English cricketer. Johnson was a right-handed batsman. He was born in Wolverhampton, Staffordshire and educated at Idsall Grammar School, Shifnal.

== Career ==
Johnson made his debut for Shropshire in the 1987 Minor Counties Championship against Berkshire. Johnson played Minor counties cricket for Shropshire from 1987 to 2003, which included 58 Minor Counties Championship appearances and 24 MCCA Knockout Trophy appearances. He made his List A debut against Leicestershire in the 1989 NatWest Trophy. He made 7 further List A appearances, the last of which came against the Sussex Cricket Board in 2001 Cheltenham & Gloucester Trophy. In his 8 List A matches, he scored 121 runs at an average of 17.28, with a high score of 62. This score, which was his only half century in List A cricket, came against the Sussex Cricket Board in 2001. With the ball, he bowled a total of 6 wicket-less overs.

County capped for Shropshire in 1996, he also played cricket at club level for Shifnal and St. George's, as well as soccer for Shifnal Town.
