= Adam Shimmons =

English cricketer

Personal information
- Full name: Adam Mark Shimmons
- Born: 16 October 1972 (age 54); Hillingdon, Middlesex, England
- Batting: Left-handed
- Bowling: Right-arm fast-medium

Domestic team information
- Years: Team
- 1996–present: Shropshire

Career statistics
Competition	List A
Matches	11
Runs scored	67
Batting average	11.16
100s/50s	–/–
Top score	23
Balls bowled	522
Wickets	13
Bowling average	29.84
5 wickets in innings	–
10 wickets in match	–
Best bowling	3/30
Catches/stumpings	3/–
- Source: Cricinfo, 2 July 2011

Adam Mark Shimmons (born 16 October 1972) is an English cricketer. Shimmons is a left-handed batsman who bowls right-arm fast-medium. He was born in Hillingdon, Middlesex and educated at Idsall Grammar School in Shifnal, Shropshire.

Shimmons made his debut for Shropshire in the 1996 Minor Counties Championship against Dorset. Shimmons has played Minor counties cricket for Shropshire from 1996 to present, which has included 46 Minor Counties Championship appearances and 30 MCCA Knockout Trophy appearances, while playing at club level for Shifnal and Oulton Park. He made his List A debut against Sussex in the 1997 NatWest Trophy. He made 10 further List A appearances, the last of which came against Warwickshire in the 2004 Cheltenham & Gloucester Trophy. In his 11 List A matches, he scored 67 runs at an average of 11.16, with a high score of 23. With the ball, he took 13 wickets at a bowling average of 29.84, with best figures of 3/30.
