= Listed buildings in Shifnal =

Shifnal is a civil parish in Shropshire, England. It contains 79 listed buildings that are recorded in the National Heritage List for England. Of these, one is listed at Grade I, the highest of the three grades, three are at Grade II*, the middle grade, and the others are at Grade II, the lowest grade. The parish contains the market town of Shifnal and the surrounding countryside. In the town, most of the listed buildings are houses, cottages, shops, and public houses and hotels, the earliest of which are timber framed or have timber-framed cores. The other listed buildings in the town include a church, items in the churchyard, a former workhouse, and a bank. Outside the town are four country houses, which are listed together with associated structures, and the other listed buildings include farmhouses and farm buildings, houses and cottages, two bridges, a sewer ventilation pipe, and a former watermill and associated buildings.

== Key ==
| Grade | Criteria |
|---|---|
| I | Buildings of exceptional interest, sometimes considered to be internationally important |
| II* | Particularly important buildings of more than special interest |
| II | Buildings of national importance and special interest |

== Buildings ==
| Name and location | Photograph | Date | Notes | Grade |
|---|---|---|---|---|
| St Andrew's Church; 52.66454°N 2.37576°W | | 12th century | The church was altered and extended during the following centuries, restored in 1876–79 by George Gilbert Scott, and the vestry was added in 1899–1900 by W. D. Caröe. The church is built in sandstone and has tile roofs and a cruciform plan. It consists of a nave with a clerestory, north and south aisles, a south porch, north and south transepts, a chancel with chapel and a north vestry, and a tower at the crossing. The tower has three stages, a stair turret at the northwest, an embattled parapet, and a pyramidal roof with a finial. Inside the nave is a double hammerbeam roof. | I |
| Barn, Manor Farm; 52.65523°N 2.38640°W | — | Mid 16th century | Originally a domestic building, later converted into a barn, it is in red brick with sandstone dressings on a plinth, and has a tile roof and one storey. It contains doorways, mullioned and transomed windows, and air vents, some of which are blocked. | II |
| 16 Bradford Street and The Cottage; 52.66704°N 2.37270°W | | Mid 16th century | A house at right angles to the road, it was extended to the rear in the 17th century. The house is timber framed with red brick infill, rendered at the front, and has a tile roof. There are two storeys and three bays. The gable is jettied with scrolled brackets, and in the gable end are a small name shield, a doorway, and two casement windows. | II |
| The Old Malthouse; 52.66913°N 2.37310°W | | 16th century | A timber framed house on a plinth that was refaced in brick and rendered, it has a band, a dentilled eaves cornice, and a tile roof. There are two storeys and an attic, and two bays. The central doorway and the windows, which are sashes, have segmental heads, and there are two gabled eaves dormers. | II |
| Gazebo, walls and steps, The Manor House; 52.65459°N 2.38444°W | — | Mid to late 16th century | The terrace retaining walls surround a rectangular area to the south and west of the house about 25 metres (82 ft) by 35 metres (115 ft), with a projection to the west. They are in sandstone with red brick coping. There is a gateway to the west with a wrought iron gate leading to a dog-leg staircase. In the centre of the south wall is a gazebo in sandstone and brick that has a tiled ogee roof with a lead finial. It has two storeys and an octagonal plan. In the ground floor is a chamfered square window, the upper floor contains three mullioned windows, and there is a doorway in each floor. | II |
| 8, 8A and 10 Market Place; 52.66563°N 2.37304°W | | Late 16th century | A house, later used for other purposes, it is timber framed with plastered panels and a tile roof. There are two storeys, a two-bay range to the left, a one-bay gabled cross-wing on the right, and a one-bay gabled rear wing. The upper floor is jettied with a moulded bressumer and two brackets with carved heads. In the ground floor are two doorways and three small-paned shop windows, and in the upper floor are three windows with lattice glazing. | II |
| Coppice Green House; 52.67789°N 2.35697°W | — | Late 16th century | The house was considerably extended in the 18th century. The original part is timber framed with rendered panels, the extension is in brick with stone dressings, and the roof is tiled. It has an L-shaped plan, with three storeys in the main part, one storey to the left, and two storeys at the rear, and a front of three bays. There is a plinth, bands, a dentilled eaves cornice and parapeted gable ends. The doorway has panelled pilasters, and a triangular pediment with a dentilled cornice on curved brackets. Most of the windows are casements, and there is a sash window in the single-storey block. | II |
| Old Idsall House; 52.66477°N 2.37482°W | | Late 16th century | The house was altered and extended in the 18th century. The older part is timber framed with rendered infill panels, the later parts are in brick, and the roof is tiled. There are two storeys, a central range with one bay, a two-bay projecting wing to the left, later extended, and a later gabled wing to the right. Some of the windows are casements and others are sashes. | II |
| 13A and 15 Market Place; 52.66540°N 2.37262°W | | c. 1600 | A pair of houses, later shops and flats, they are timber framed with rendered panels and a tile roof. There are two storeys, three bays, and a two-bay rear wing. The upper floor is jettied and has a moulded bressumer. In the ground floor are modern shop fronts, above are mullioned and transomed windows, and five small gables that are also jettied. | II |
| 1 and 1A Park Street; 52.66530°N 2.37260°W | | c. 1600 | Two houses, later used for other purposes, the building is timber framed with rendered panels, and a tile roof. There are three storeys and two bays. The top floor is jettied with a moulded bressumer on three scrolled brackets, and above are four jettied gables with a continuous moulded bressumer. In the top floor are three casement windows, and in each lower floor are two oriel windows, those in the ground floor flanking a pair of doors. | II |
| 14 Market Place; 52.66547°N 2.37300°W | | Early to mid 17th century | A house, later used for other purposes, it is timber framed with rendered panels and a tile roof. There are two gabled bays at right angles. The left bay has one storey and an attic, and contains a shop front, and the right bay has two storeys, the upper floor jettied with moulded bressumers. The windows are casements. | II |
| 77 Aston Street; 52.66744°N 2.36863°W | | 17th century | The house was partially refaced in the 19th century. The early part is timber framed, and has facing in red brick with a dentilled eaves cornice, and a tile roof with a stepped parapeted gable end on the left. There are two storeys and three bays. On the front is a porch with a stepped gable, and a doorway with a moulded architrave and a gabled hood, and the windows are casements. | II |
| 14 Bradford Street and shop 52.66693°N 2.37267°W | | 17th century | A house with a shop added to the left in the 19th century. The house is in rendered timber framing, the shop is in brick, and the roof is tiled. They form an L-shaped plan, the house with two storeys and a gable end facing the street. The gable has bargeboards and a finial, and below are mullioned windows and a doorway. The shop has a single storey, and contains two canted bay windows flanked by doorways, that on the left with a segmental head. | II |
| 24 Broadway; 52.66827°N 2.37281°W | | 17th century | Originally a house, with a shop added to the right in the 18th century. The house is timber framed and faced in brick, the shop is in brick, and the roof is tiled. There are two storeys, the house has one bay, and the shop has three, with a gable above the left two bays. In the ground floor of the house is a canted bay window with a hipped roof, a doorway to the right, and a sash window above. The shop has a 19th-century shop front and three casement windows above. Railings enclose the area to the front of the house. | II |
| 4 Church Street; 52.66547°N 2.37316°W | — | 17th century | A house, later used for other purposes, it is timber framed with a brick front, a dentilled eaves cornice, and a tile roof. There are two storeys and an attic, and two bays. In the ground floor are two curved shop windows flanking a door, in the upper floor are sash windows, and above is a flat-topped dormer. | II |
| 6 Market Place; 52.66569°N 2.37300°W | | 17th century | A house, later a shop and a flat, it was originally timber framed and was refaced in red brick in the early 18th century. It has stone dressings, a ramped parapet with moulded stone coping, and a tile roof. There are three storeys and three bays, the right bay slightly recessed and containing a passageway. In the ground floor of the other bays is a shop front consisting of two small-paned bow windows with flanking pilasters, between which is a doorway with pilasters. In the upper floors are sash windows with projecting keystones. | II |
| 12 Market Place; 52.66554°N 2.37309°W | | 17th century | A house, later a shop, it is timber framed with rendered and brick infill and a tile roof. There is one storey and an attic, and one bay. In the ground floor is a 19th-century shop front with arched windows, a central recessed door, and a passageway door to the right. Above is a gabled dormer with casements. | II |
| 13 Market Place; 52.66551°N 2.37262°W | | 17th century | A house, later a house and shop, it was extended at the front in the 18th century. The early part is timber framed, the extension is in red brick with a sill band and a moulded eaves cornice, and the roof is tiled and hipped at the front. There is an L-shaped plan, the front range has three storeys and three bays, and the rear wing has two storeys and one bay. In the ground floor is a multi-paned shop window on the left and a doorway to the right with an architrave, a radial fanlight, and a flat hood. In the middle floor is a canted bay window, and the other windows are sashes. | II |
| 26 Broadway; 52.66836°N 2.37282°W | | 17th century | Formerly the Plough Inn, later a restaurant, it is timber framed, and has a rendered front with applied timber, and a tile roof with parapeted gable ends. There are two storeys, two bays, and a rear wing. In the ground floor are two canted bay windows, and above are casement windows. | II |
| 2 Church Street; 52.66587°N 2.37307°W | | 17th century | A house, later a shop, it was refaced in the 19th century. The shop is timber framed with brick infill, and has painted brick at the front with a dentilled eaves cornice, and a tile roof. There are two storeys and an attic, and two bays. In the ground floor is a shop front, and a doorway with a segmental head to the right, in the upper floor are sash windows, and above is a flat-topped dormer. | II |
| Farm buildings, Aston Hall; 52.67015°N 2.36250°W | — | 17th century | The farm buildings consist of barns, a byre, a hayloft and a coach house, some of which were added during the following centuries, forming an L-shaped plan. The earlier parts are timber framed with brick infill on a plinth, the later parts are in sandstone or brick, and they have tile roofs. The openings include various doorways and windows, coach house doors and ventilation holes. | II |
| Haughton Grange; 52.67512°N 2.38137°W | | 17th century | The house was refaced and extended in the 19th century. It is timber framed with refacing and extensions in rendered brick, and has a tile roof. There is one storey and an attic, a front of three bays, and a later gabled wing on the left. On the front are four pairs of French casement windows with unfluted pilastered surrounds, arcaded Gothic friezes, and incurved metal hoods. There is a central semi-octagonal porch, and a doorway with a moulded architrave. Above are three gabled eaves dormers. | II |
| Stanton Cottages; 52.66566°N 2.34011°W | — | 17th century | A pair of timber framed cottages with red brick infill, some underbuilding and refacing in red brick, and a tile roof. There is one storey and an attic, two bays, and a lean-to on the left. The windows are casements, and there are three gabled eaves dormers. | II |
| The Wheatsheaf Public House; 52.66960°N 2.37306°W | | 17th century | The public house is timber framed on a plinth, with refacing and extensions in brick, and a tile roof. There is one storey and an attic, three bays, and a single-bay rear wing. In the ground floor are three canted bay windows and a bow window, and above are three gabled eaves dormers. The doorway has a bracketed segmental hood. | II |
| The former Unicorn Public House; 52.66522°N 2.37257°W | | 17th century | The inn was refaced on the front in about 1800. It is timber framed, partly rendered, and has a tile roof. There are three storeys, an L-shaped plan, and a front of three bays. The doorway has a panelled architrave, a frieze and a cornice, and to the left is a vehicular entrance. The windows in the top floor are casements, in the middle bay they are blind, and the other windows are sashes. | II |
| The White Harte Inn; 52.67084°N 2.37219°W | | 17th century | The public house was later extended. It is timber framed, rendered on the right and on the gable ends, and has a tile roof. There is one storey and an attic, and a T-shaped plan, with a range of three bays, and a single-bay rear wing. The upper floor is jettied with scrolled brackets and a moulded bressumer. In the ground floor are two square bay windows with diamond-leaded casements, and above are two large gabled eaves dormers with jettied tie beams. To the right is a two-storey extension with a dormer and a vehicular entrance. | II |
| The Idsall Rooms; 52.66397°N 2.37199°W | | 1699 | The house, later part of a hotel, is in red brick on a plinth with bands, rendered quoins, a moulded eaves cornice, and a hipped tile roof. There are three storeys, five bays, a later extension to the left with two storeys and one bay, and another extension recessed to the right with two storeys and two bays. Four segmental curved steps lead up to a central doorway that has an architrave, a radial fanlight, and a semicircular hood with an egg and dart moulded cornice on decorated console brackets. The windows are sashes with scrolled decorated keystones. | II |
| Jerningham Arms Hotel; 52.66497°N 2.37272°W | | 1705 | The hotel was refaced and extended in about 1800, and later converted into flats. It is stuccoed on a plinth, with a moulded eaves cornice, and a tile roof with parapeted gable ends. The original part has five bays, the left two bays with two storeys and the others with three, and the extension recessed to the right has three storeys and four bays. In the ground floor of the original part are three canted bay windows, a vehicular entrance in the first bay, and in the fourth bay is a doorway with a moulded architrave, half-Tuscan pilasters, and a flat hood on fluted brackets. The other windows in the lower two floors are sashes, in the top floor they are top-hung casements, and in the extension are two plain doorways. | II |
| Haughton Hall; 52.67245°N 2.38384°W | | 1718 | A country house, later used for other purposes, it is in stuccoed red brick on a moulded plinth, with moulded string courses, a moulded cornice, a panelled and coped parapet, and a two-span slate roof with parapeted gable ends. There are two storeys, attics and a basement, a front of seven bays, and two-storey two-bay flanking wings. Eight steps lead up to a central entrance that has a doorcase with three-quarter Ionic columns, and an entablature with a pulvinated frieze and a triangular pediment, and a doorway with an architrave and a keystone. The windows are sashes with keystones. | II* |
| Aston Hall; 52.66957°N 2.36220°W | | c. 1710 | A country house that was altered and extended in the 19th century. It is pebbledashed on a plinth, with stuccoed and painted stone dressings, quoins, a moulded eaves cornice, a blocking course, and a two-span slate roof. There are three storeys, a front of seven bays, and a single-storey extension to the left. In the centre is a porch with Doric columns and pilasters carrying a half-architrave, a frieze, a cornice, and a blocking course. The windows are sashes with moulded architraves. | II* |
| 32 Church Street; 52.66484°N 2.37450°W | — | Early 18th century | The house, which was later refaced, is in red brick on a red sandstone plinth, with dentilled eaves, and a tile roof. There are two storeys and an attic, a front of two bays, a long rear wing on the left, and a rear outshut on the right. The doorway has panelled jambs and a flat hood on corbelled blocks. The windows on the front are sashes, and in the left return the attic window is a horizontally-sliding sash. | II |
| 22 Market Place; 52.66525°N 2.37290°W | | Early to mid 18th century | A house, later a shop, it is in red brick with a moulded eaves cornice, and a tile roof with parapeted gable ends. There is an L-shaped plan with a front block of two storeys and an attic and two bays, and a two-bay rear wing with two storeys. On the ground floor are two shop fronts, the windows are sashes, and there are two gabled eaves dormers. | II |
| Grange Farmhouse; 52.63628°N 2.35709°W | — | Mid 18th century | The farmhouse is in red brick with a bracketed eaves cornice, and a tile roof with parapeted gable ends. There are three storeys and three bays. The central doorway has a moulded architrave, a fanlight, and a bracketed hood. The windows in the top floor are mullioned, and in the lower floors they are mullioned and transomed, and have raised keystones. | II |
| Innage House; 52.66431°N 2.37674°W | — | Mid 18th century | A red brick house on a plinth, with a moulded eaves cornice, and a hippedslate roof with globe finials at the ends. There are three storeys, and an L-shaped plan with a front of three bays. The doorway has Tuscan half-columns, a broken entablature, an open triangular pediment, an architrave, and a semicircular fanlight with Gothic tracery. The windows are sashes. | II |
| Rookery Farmhouse; 52.63985°N 2.33545°W | — | 18th century | The farmhouse is in red brick on a stone plinth, with bands, a dentilled eaves cornice, and a tile roof with parapeted gable ends. There are two storeys and attics, and an L-shaped plan with a front of three bays. The central doorway has panelled pilasters, a fanlight, a frieze, and a cornice. In the ground floor is a canted bay window, and the other windows are sashes with rendered architraves. | II |
| The Manor House; 52.65510°N 2.38453°W | — | Mid 18th century | The house is in sandstone with some repairs in brick, and has a tile roof with a parapeted gable end to the left. There are two storeys and an attic, and four bays. The doorway and the windows, which are sashes, have keyed lintels, and there are four gabled half-dormers with cross-windows and serrated bargeboards. | II |
| Hatton Grange, wall, gate and gatepiers 52.63585°N 2.34921°W | — | 1764–68 | A country house designed by Thomas Farnolls Pritchard, and extended in 1897–98, it is in red brick with stone dressings, and has a hipped slate roof. The house consists of a main block with three storeys, fronts of seven and three bays, and quadrant walls linking to single-storey pavilions. The doorway has three-quarter Doric columns, a semicircular fanlight, a triglyph frieze, and an open triangular pediment. Most of the windows are sashes, there are two-storey canted bay windows, and in the pavilions are Venetian windows and lunettes. Attached to the house is a quadrant garden wall with wrought iron gates at the end, gate piers with globe finials, and an elaborate overthrow. | II* |
| 25 and 27 Broadway; 52.66834°N 2.37324°W | — | Mid to late 18th century | A pair of red brick houses with end pilaster strips, a moulded eaves cornice, and a tile roof. There are three storeys and four bays. The doorways have panelled pilaster strips, architraves, semicircular fanlights with intersecting Gothic tracery, and flat hoods with moulded cornices and panelled soffits. The windows are sashes. | II |
| 43 Broadway; 52.66887°N 2.37326°W | — | Mid to late 18th century | A red brick house with end pilaster strips, a moulded eaves cornice, and a tile roof with parapeted gable ends. There are three storeys, and an L-shaped plan with a front of two bays. The doorway has panelled pilasters, a frieze, and a triangular pediment, and to the left is a blocked doorway with a round head and a keystone. The windows are sashes with projecting keystones. | II |
| The Vicarage; 52.66415°N 2.37592°W | | Mid to late 18th century | The former vicarage, which is in Georgian style, is in red brick with end pilaster strips, a moulded eaves cornice, and a hipped tile roof. There are three storeys and five bays, the middle bay projecting with rendered sill bands and a triangular pediment. The central doorcase has fluted three-quarter Doric columns, a broken entablature with a triglyph frieze, and an open triangular pediment, and the doorway has an architrave and a semicircular fanlight with Gothic tracery. This is flanked by round-headed side lights, and the other windows are sashes. | II |
| No. 2 Manor Cottages and Wall; 52.65501°N 2.38478°W | — | Late 18th century | A red brick house that has a tile roof with parapeted gable ends. There are two storeys and three bays. In the upper floor are three sash windows, and the ground floor contains a lean-to porch, a doorway and a mullioned and transomed window, both with segmental heads, and a casement window. The wall to the north is in sandstone and red brick with chamfered stone coping; it is about 25 metres (82 ft) long and about 1.5 metres (4 ft 11 in) high. | II |
| No. 3 Manor Cottages; 52.65524°N 2.38458°W | — | Late 18th century | A red brick house with a dentilled eaves cornice and a tile roof. There are two storeys and two bays. The windows in the upper floor are sashes, and in the ground floor they are mullioned and transomed, and all have segmental heads. | II |
| 2 Market Place; 52.66587°N 2.37299°W | | Late 18th century | A house, later a shop, in red brick with a moulded eaves cornice and a tile roof. There are three storeys and three bays. In the ground floor are 19th-century shop fronts and a door with a rectangular fanlight, above them is an extended fascia, and in the upper floors are sash windows, those in the middle floor with painted lintels and projecting keystones. | II |
| 2A Market Place; 52.66595°N 2.37304°W | | Late 18th century | A house, later a shop, in red brick with a tile roof. There are two storeys and two bays. In the ground floor is a shop front, and in the upper floor are sash windows with rendered lintels and projecting keystones. | II |
| 4 Market Place; 52.66578°N 2.37296°W | | Late 18th century | A house, later a shop, in stuccoed brick with a moulded eaves cornice and a tile roof. There are three storeys and three bays. The right two bays contain shop windows in the ground floor and sash windows above. In the left bay is a large two-storey canted bay window. In the ground floor are Doric pilasters and an entablature. Between the pilasters is a central doorway and flanking windows, all with round heads, moulded architraves, imposts, and scrolled keystones. | II |
| 16, 18A and 18B Market Place; 52.66540°N 2.37289°W | | Late 18th century | Originally two houses, later three shops and a flat, the building is in red brick with a dentilled eaves cornice and a tile roof. There are three storeys and three bays. In the ground floor are three 20th-century shop fronts, and above are sash windows. | II |
| Chest tomb 52.66443°N 2.37561°W | — | Late 18th century | The chest tomb is in the churchyard of St Andrew's Church. It is in stone, and has a moulded base, sides with fluted end pilaster strips, a chamfered top, recessed semicircular side panels, and raised oval end panels. The inscription is illegible. | II |
| Drayton Lodge Farmhouse and Former Coach House; 52.68412°N 2.36006°W | — | Late 18th century | The farmhouse is in red brick on a stone plinth, with a moulded eaves cornice and a hipped slate roof. There are three storeys and three bays. In the centre is a former half-octagonal porch, and the windows are sashes. The former coach houses, recessed to the left, is in red brick with a hipped tile roof, two storeys, and a recessed blind round arch containing a semicircular window. | II |
| Hem Manor Farmhouse and Screen Wall; 52.64870°N 2.40673°W | — | Late 18th century | The farmhouse is in red brick, rendered at the right end, with a dentilled eaves cornice and a tile roof. There is an L-shaped plan, the main block with three storeys and three bays, a two-storey rear wing, and a single-storey lean-to on the left. The windows are sashes, and the gabled porch has a double-chamfered round arch. To the right is a screen wall containing a blocked segmental arch, and a blocked gateway with a triangular pediment, flanked by square piers with globe finials. | II |
| Cosford Bridge; 52.63861°N 2.32585°W | | c.1780 | The bridge carries a road over the River Worfe. It is in sandstone, and consists of a single segmental arch. The bridge has a raised keystone, a flat string course, a plain parapet, and a quadrant plan. | II |
| Former Coach House and Stable Block North of Manor Cottages; 52.65534°N 2.38492°W | — | c. 1800 | The former coach house and stable block are in red brick with a hipped tile roof. There are two storeys and six bays. Along the front is a blind arcade with an impost band and smaller recessed arches in the tympana. There are various doorways and a segmental-headed window in the front, and in the left end is a sash window and a loft window. | II |
| 28 and 30 Church Street; 52.66489°N 2.37426°W | — | Late 18th or early 19th century | A pair of red brick cottages with dentilled eaves and a tile roof. There are two storeys and each cottage has two bays. In each cottage is a central doorway with reeded pilasters and a flat hood, and between the cottages is a passageway with a segmental arch. The windows are sashes. | II |
| Decker Hill and Courtyard; 52.68433°N 2.36901°W | | c. 1810 | A country house, later a golf clubhouse, it is stuccoed with a floor band, a frieze, an eaves cornice on paired brackets, and a hipped slate roof. There are two storeys, an entrance front at the east of five bays, a south front of six bays, and a north front of three bays. The middle bay of the east front is recessed and has a pair of giant Ionic columns in Grinshill sandstone, and a doorway with a reeded architrave and a radial segmental fanlight. Flanking the outer bays are reeded pilaster strips. In the north front is a three-storey bow window and a two-storey canted bay window, and the other windows are sashes. To the east is an entrance courtyard that has low stone walls with urns, and gate piers with cornices. | II |
| North Lodge, Decker Hill; 52.68729°N 2.36264°W | | c. 1810 | The lodge is in painted sandstone on a plinth, with a frieze, and a slate roof with triangular pedimented gable ends. There is one storey and four bays. The third bay projects and has an open pedimented gable, and the windows are sashes. | II |
| Gate, gatepiers and railings, Decker Hill; 52.68717°N 2.36264°W | | c. 1810 | The gates, gate piers and railings at the entrance to the drive are in wrought iron. The piers contain latticework, and have cast iron caps and globe finials. There is a single gate, and the flanking railings have a curved plan. | II |
| South Lodge, Decker Hill; 52.68116°N 2.36728°W | | c. 1810 | The lodge is in sandstone on a plinth, with a frieze, and a slate roof with triangular pedimented gable ends. There is one storey and four bays. The second bay from the right projects and has an open pedimented gable, and the windows are sashes. | II |
| Temple, Decker Hill; 52.68502°N 2.37583°W | — | c. 1810 | The temple on the grounds of the house is in sandstone, it has a circular plan, and is in Neoclassical style. On the southeast side is a colonnade with three unfluted Doric columns carrying an entablature, and it has a domed roof. | II |
| Former Workhouse; 52.66210°N 2.37272°W | | 1817 | The former workhouse, later converted for residential use, is in red brick on a plinth, with stone dressings, a band, a dentilled eaves cornice, and a hipped slate roof. There are two storeys and an L-shaped plan, with a main range of ten bays, and a projecting two-bay right wing. The windows are cross-windows, those in the ground floor in blank arcading. | II |
| Brook House; 52.66586°N 2.37316°W | | Early 19th century | A brick house with a Welsh slate roof, two storeys and a basement, and an L-shaped plan, each range having four bays. In the garden front is a verandah, and within it is a doorway with a cornice and consoles. Most of the windows are sashes. | II |
| Drayton Lodge; 52.68410°N 2.35983°W | — | Early 19th century | A red brick house with a moulded eaves cornice and a hipped slate roof. There are two storeys and four bays. The doorway has Doric pilasters, a frieze, a cornice, and a rectangular fanlight, and the windows are sashes. | II |
| Evelith Manor; 52.64159°N 2.37137°W | — | Early 19th century | A stuccoed house on a plinth, with a band, a cornice, a blocking course, and a hipped slate roof. In the centre is a projecting portico with paired Greek Doric columns, and an entablature. The windows are sashes with architraves, and at the southwest corner is an Italianate belvedere. | II |
| Evelith Millhouse; 52.64285°N 2.38079°W | | Early 19th century | A red brick house with giant end pilaster strips, a coved eaves cornice, and a hipped slate roof. There are two storeys and three bays. In the centre is a porch with paired Tuscan columns, a half-architrave, a frieze, a cornice, and a blocking course. The doorway has a reeded architrave, and most of the windows are sashes with keyed lintels. | II |
| Oldforge Bridge; 52.62780°N 2.36620°W | | Early 19th century | A causeway and a bridge carrying a road over the Wesley Brook, it is in sandstone, and is about 65 metres (213 ft) long. It contains a round arch over the brook, and two segmental flood arches with flanking buttresses. There is a string course, a coped parapet, and square end piers. | II |
| Gate, gate piers and railings, The Manor House; 52.65503°N 2.38469°W | — | Early 19th century | The gate, gate piers and railings are in wrought iron. In the centre is the gate, which is flanked by openwork gate piers with a square section and surmounted by urn finials, and outside these are plain railings. | II |
| Former Mill and Ancillary Buildings, Hem Farm; 52.65005°N 2.40027°W | — | c. 1829 | The former watermill and associated buildings are in red brick with hipped roofs. The central block has three storeys, and is flanked by wings of one and two storeys. The buildings contain doorways and windows, most with segmental heads, and on the south side is a cast iron breastshot water wheel over which is a gabled canopy with brick piers. | II |
| 7 and 9 Victoria Road; 52.66629°N 2.37381°W | — | c. 1830 | A pair of houses, later offices, in red brick with end pilaster strips, a frieze band, and a slate roof. There are three storeys and basements, and each house has two bays. Each doorway has ornamental pilaster strips, an entablature with a triglyph frieze, and a triangular pediment. The windows are sashes with keyed lintels, and the basement areas are enclosed by railings. | II |
| 7 Shrewsbury Road; 52.66752°N 2.37435°W | — | 1830 | A red brick house with a dentilled eaves cornice and a slate roof. There are two storeys, and an L-shaped plan with a two-bay front and a rear wing. Steps lead up to a central doorway with pilaster strips and a triangular pediment, and the windows are sashes. | II |
| The Terrace, water tower and wall 52.65393°N 2.36858°W | — | c. 1835 | The house and water tower are in red brick with sandstone dressings. The house is rendered at the rear, and has a plinth and a hipped slate roof. There are three storeys, three bays, and a two-storey extension set back on the left. On the front is a porch with Ionic columns and pilasters, a full entablature with a dentilled cornice, and a doorway with a moulded architrave. There are two canted bay windows and a bow window, and the other windows are sashes. To the south is the water tower that has a square plan, two storeys, and an embattled parapet with chamfered coping. The retaining wall is in stone with an embattled parapet, and is about 15 metres (49 ft) long and 20 metres (66 ft) high. | II |
| Lloyd's Bank; 52.66490°N 2.37239°W | | c. 1840 | The bank, which is in Italianate style, is stuccoed on a plinth, and has channelled rustication on the ground floor, a string course, a first-floor cornice, a bracketed eaves cornice, and twin triangular pedimented gable ends. There are two storeys, and an entrance front of five bays, the middle bay projecting, with rounded corners and pilasters containing wreaths and lion masks. In the centre is a round-headed doorway with a keystone, and above and in the outer parts are round-headed windows, those in the upper floor blind. The outer bays contain sash windows with channelled voussoirs and projecting keystones. | II |
| North View; 52.66758°N 2.37274°W | — | c. 1840 | A house, later flats, in red brick on a plinth, with a double dentilled eaves cornice, and a hipped slate roof. There are three storeys and three bays. Three steps lead up to a central doorway that has an architrave, a radial fanlight, tapering fluted pilasters, and an entablature. The windows are sashes. | II |
| Park House Hotel; 52.66353°N 2.37228°W | | c. 1840 | A house in Neoclassical style, later a hotel, it is stuccoed, on a plinth, with a floor band, a frieze, a cornice, a blocking course, and a hipped slate roof. There are two storeys, the entrance front has five bays, the middle bay projecting slightly, and the left front has four bays. In the centre is a porch with paired Greek Doric columns, a deep entablature with a cornice and a blocking course, and a doorway with a moulded architrave. The windows are sashes, those in the ground floor with cornices on fluted console brackets, and the middle window in the top floor with an incised architrave. | II |
| The Uplands; 52.65872°N 2.36964°W | — | c. 1840 | A stuccoed house in Tudor style with scalloped eaves boards and a hipped slate roof. There are two storeys and three bays, the right bay projecting with canted sides. The windows are cross-windows with mullions and transoms, four-centred arched lights, and hood moulds. In the centre is a canted porch with a cornice, a coped parapet, and a four-centred arched head. | II |
| Victoria House; 52.66626°N 2.37363°W | — | c. 1840 | A red brick house with a frieze band and a slate roof. There are two storeys and three bays. The central doorway has panelled pilasters, a panelled frieze, and a flat hood on brackets. The windows are sashes with painted lintels, and keystones in the ground floor. | II |
| Evelith Mill; 52.64283°N 2.38078°W | | Mid 19th century | A former watermill, it is in brown brick with a dentilled eaves cornice and a tile roof. There are two storeys, a basement and an attic, a main block with three bays, a single storey block with a basement, and a cart shed to the left, and to the right is a linking block to Evelith Mill House. The windows have round-arched heads, there is a gabled half-dormer hoist, a loft door in the middle floor, and five steps lead up to a doorway on the left. | II |
| Evelith Manor Lodge and gatepiers 52.64334°N 2.36681°W | | Mid 19th century | The entrance lodge is stuccoed with chamfered quoins, a frieze, and a hipped slate roof. There is one storey and three bays. In the centre is a porch with Tuscan columns and pilasters, a frieze, and a doorway with an architrave. The windows are mullioned. The stone gate piers have a square plan, and each has arched panels, a cornice, tiled copings, and globe finials. | II |
| Sewer ventilation pipe 52.66645°N 2.37524°W | | 19th century | The ventilation pipe is in cast iron and about 4 metres (13 ft) tall. It has a moulded base, at the half-way point are protruding discs, and at the top is a collar with four round studs and a capital with stylised leaves. | II |
| Water Tower north of Aston Hall; 52.66993°N 2.36246°W | — | Mid 19th century | The water tower is in brown brick on a plinth, with bands, and a pyramidal lead roof. It has a hexagonal plan, and two storeys. In both floors are arcades with round arches. | II |
| Wall and Dovecote, Hatton Grange; 52.63584°N 2.34881°W | — | Late 19th century | The wall is in red brick with ramped stone coping and four buttresses, and is about 20 metres (66 ft) long. The dovecote is in Gothic style, built in red brick, and has a pyramidal tile roof. There is a square plan, two storeys, a dentilled eaves cornice, a cupola, and a pyramidal lead cap. It contains a doorway, and arched windows in the upper floor. | II |
| Timlet Lodge, walls and gate 52.66659°N 2.32997°W | | c. 1904 | The entrance lodge to Ruckley Grange, designed by Ernest George and Yates in Arts and Crafts style, is pebbledashed and has a tile roof. There is one storey and an attic, and a T-shaped plan. The lodge has a gabled porch with a Tudor arched entrance, the windows are casements with moulded cornices, and the gables have moulded bargeboards and carved pendants. Extending from the doorway is a balustraded wall, and to the south is an oak garden gate. | II |
