= Peter Lamsdale =

English cricketer (born 1971)

Peter Lamsdale (born 11 March 1971) was an English cricketer. He was a right-handed batsman and right-arm medium-fast bowler who played for Berkshire. He was born in Shifnal, Shropshire.

Lamsdale, who played in the Minor Counties Championship between 1995 and 1999, made two List A appearances for the team, during the 1999 season. He picked up figures of 1–35 on his debut for the team, against Warwickshire CB.

In his second match, he scored ten runs and took figures of 1-51 from nine overs.
