= Basil Brooke (Royal Navy officer, born 1882) =

Royal Navy officer

Captain Basil Brooke DSO*
- Born: 28 November 1882
- Died: 8 October 1929 (aged 46); Ambleside, Lancashire
- Military career
- Allegiance: United Kingdom
- Branch: Royal Navy
- Service years: 1898–1922
- Rank: Captain
- Conflicts: First World War
- Awards: Distinguished Service Order & Bar; Mentioned in dispatches Legion of Honour (France)

Captain Basil Richard Brooke DSO & Bar (28 November 1882 – 8 October 1929) was a Royal Navy officer.

Basil Brooke was the son of John Townshend Brooke of Haughton Hall, Shifnal, Shropshire, England, and his wife Lady Wilhelmina, daughter of William Legge, 4th Earl of Dartmouth. He was educated at Arnold House, Llanddulas, Wales, and entered HMS Britannia as a naval cadet in 1898. He was promoted midshipman later the same year, commissioned sub-lieutenant in November 1901, and promoted lieutenant in December 1903 and lieutenant commander in 1911.

Brooke served throughout the First World War in the Mine Clearance Force, being promoted commander in 1916 and awarded the Distinguished Service Order (DSO) in July 1917 and a Bar in January 1920. He was also appointed a Chevalier of the Légion d'Honneur in September 1916. Both his brothers were killed in the war while serving in the British Army.

Brooke retired in July 1922, and was promoted captain on the retired list in November 1927. In 1923 he married Katherine Cross, granddaughter of the politician R. A. Cross, 1st Viscount Cross. He retired to Ambleside, Lancashire.

== Honours and awards ==
- 1 January 1916 Lieutenant-Commander Basil Richard Brooke was commended in recognition of their bravery and duty during mine-sweeping and mine-laying operations.
- 15 September 1916 Lieutenant-Commander Basil Richard Brooke was appointed a Croix de Chavalier by the President of the French Republic in recognition of services during the war.
- 2 July 1917 Captain Basil Richard Brooke, RN, was appointed a Companion to the Distinguished Service Order in recognition of his service in mine-sweeping operations between 1 July 1916 and 31 March 1917.
- 22 January 1920 Captain Basil Richard Brooke, DSO, RN, was awarded a Bar to the Distinguished Service Order for service in the mine clearance force.
