= Idsall School =

Location
- Coppice Green Lane; Shifnal, Shropshire, TF11 8PD; England
- Coordinates: 52°40′20″N 2°21′58″W

Information
- Type: Academy
- Motto: E Glandibus Quercus (From little acorns large oaks grow)
- Established: c. 1950
- Trust: Marches Academy Trust
- Department for Education URN: 140922 Tables
- Ofsted: Reports
- Chair of Local Governing Body: Sophie Brady
- Headteacher: Michelle King
- Gender: Coeducational
- Age: 11 to 18
- Enrolment: 1301
- Houses: Caradoc - Longmynd - Ragleth - Wrekin -
- Colours: Green, yellow and black
- Website: http://www.idsallschool.org

Idsall School is a coeducational secondary school with academy status located in the town of Shifnal in Shropshire, England. Idsall has its own Sixth Form Centre, which offers a range of A Level subjects.

On 1 June 2014, the school converted from a local authority maintained school to an academy.

On 1 September 2023, the academy joined the Marches Academy Trust, a Shropshire Multi-academy trust.

In November 2022, the school was rated 'inadequate' by Ofsted, who wrote in their report "Too many pupils do not feel safe at Idsall School. Some say that they often experience sexual harassment or discriminatory behaviour from their peers. They are not confident that teachers will deal with their concerns, so they do not report the incidents that occur". In a subsequent Ofsted inspection in November 2024, the school was rated 'good' in most categories and taken out of special measures.

== Headteachers ==
| Headteacher | From | To |
|---|---|---|
| Michelle King | 1 September 2019 | |
| Pete Bourton | 2012 | 31 August 2019 |
| Tony Parker | 2008 | 2012 |
| Don Gibbons | | 2008 |

== Notable former pupils ==
Due to its proximity to the FA's former youth academy at Lilleshall, many professional footballers, including several England internationals, attended the school during their time at Lilleshall.

- Nicky Barmby (footballer)
- Wes Brown (footballer)
- Sol Campbell (footballer)
- Jamie Carragher (footballer)
- Andy Cole (footballer)
- Joe Cole (footballer)
- Jermain Defoe (footballer)
- Rob Edwards (footballer)
- Jon Harley (footballer)
- Steve Haslam (footballer)
- Andy Johnson (cricketer)
- Michael Owen (footballer)
- Scott Parker (footballer)
- Nick Pickering (footballer)
- Adam Shimmons (cricketer)
- Ben Thatcher (footballer)
- Alison Williamson (Archer - Olympic Bronze medalist)
