= Shifnal Festival =

Music, Art & Culture Festival

- Dates: Penultimate week of September or early October
- Locations: Shifnal, Shropshire
- Years active: (1890s–1904/5), 2010–2012
- Website: http://www.shifnalfestival.com

The Shifnal Festival was an annual Music, Arts and Culture Festival held in the market town of Shifnal, Shropshire.

== History ==
Little is known about the origins of the festival. A book published in 1904 by Harold Sadler suggests the festival was a local event held in the grounds of Aston Hall to the east of the town. Aston Hall was at the time owned by Colonel Howard-McClean. Sadler's book marks the festival as being The Hadley Orpheus Choir's first competitive success.

=== Revival ===
Research carried out as part of the Shifnal Town Plan in 2008 suggested residents of the town were interested in staging a festival of arts, culture and entertainment. A committee was formed of volunteers and a date was announced for the first modern Shifnal festival in September 2010. The committee secured funding from the town council and applied for a series of grants from a number of sources.

The Shifnal Festival should not be confused with V Festival, a music festival that was held until 2017 at the nearby Weston Park (although the Weston Park address is classed as "Nr Shifnal").

== Format ==
The festival aimed itself at all age groups and claimed to provide something for everyone. Typically incorporated into the programme were:

- Live Music.
- An art exhibition which featured pieces my local artists. A theme was often given for the pieces to conform to.
- A photographic exhibition, which was often themed and formed part of a competition.
- A form of drama or performing arts show.
- Dance workshops or classes.
- Craft workshops and fairs.
- A spirituality element such as choral singing or religion based art.
- Spoken word and poetry events.
- A Film event.
- A family fun day.
- Fringe events organised by local businesses and groups.

== Awards ==
In 2010 the Festival was Commended by the Action for Market Town Awards. The award is displayed on the Festival's website

== Festivals ==
=== 2010 Festival ===
17–26 September 2010.

=== 2011 Festival ===
13–25 September 2011.

=== 2012 Festival ===
4–7 October 2012.
The 2012 festival took on a victoriana theme and included a vintage fair.
At the close of the festival, the organising committee disbanded due to lack of funding to continue with the annual running of the festival.
