= Shifnal =

Town and civil parish in Shropshire, England

Coordinates: 52.665°N 2.373°W

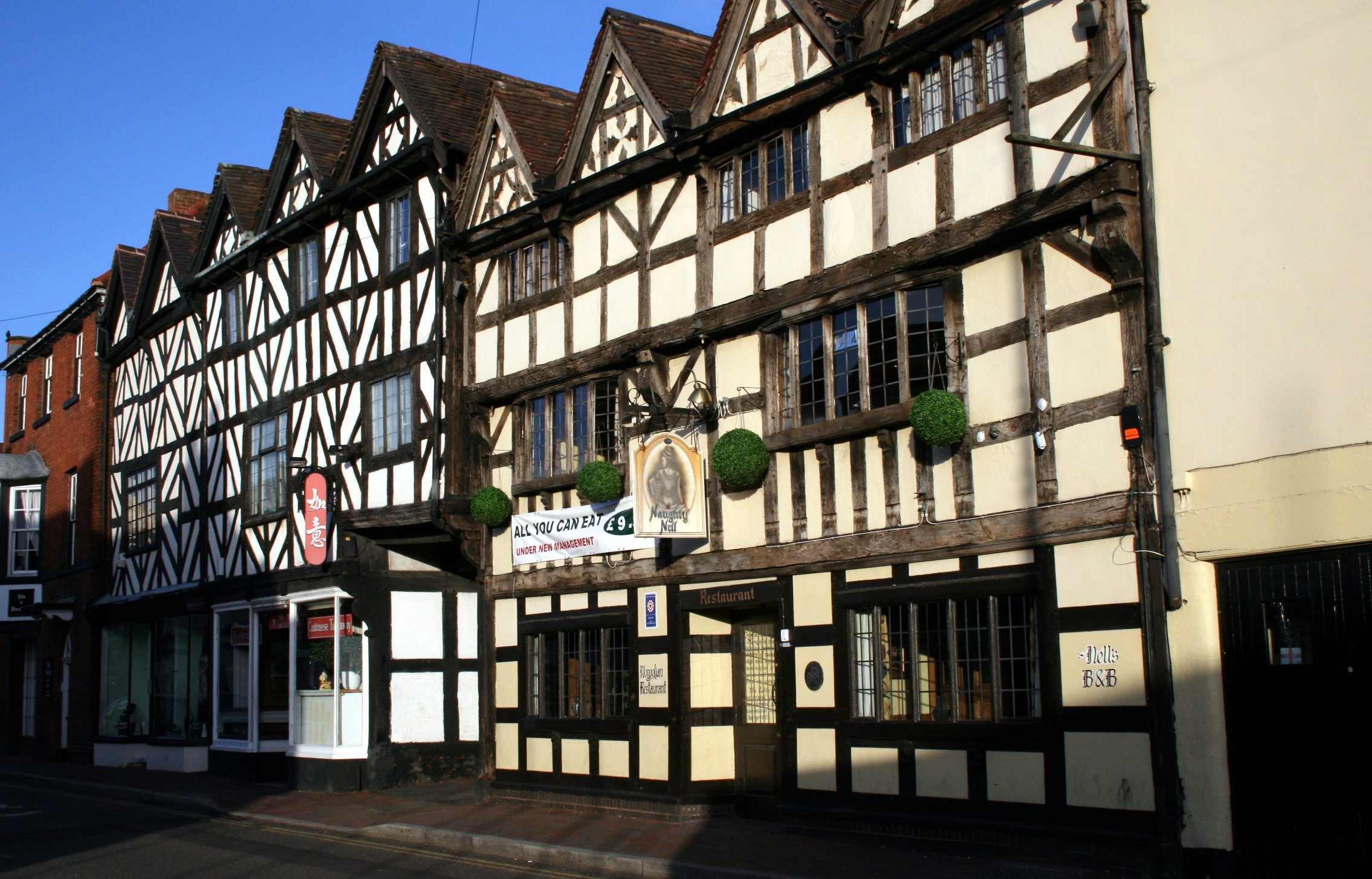
- Market Place and Park Street

- Location within Shropshire
- Population: 7,009 (2017)
- OS grid reference: SJ7407
- Civil parish: Shifnal
- Unitary authority: Shropshire
- Ceremonial county: Shropshire
- Region: West Midlands
- Country: England
- Sovereign state: United Kingdom
- Post town: SHIFNAL
- Postcode district: TF11
- Dialling code: 01952
- Police: West Mercia
- Fire: Shropshire
- Ambulance: West Midlands
- UK Parliament: The Wrekin

Shifnal (/ʃɪfnəl/) is a market town and civil parish in Shropshire, England, about 4 miles (6 km) east of Telford, 17 miles (27 km) east of Shrewsbury and 13 miles (20 km) west-northwest of Wolverhampton. It is near the M54 motorway and A5 road aka Watling Street. At the 2001 census, it had a population of 6,391, increasing to 6,776 at the 2011 census.

== Etymology ==
Shifnal is thought to be the place named "Scuffanhalch" in a 9th-century charter, as a possession of the monastery at Medeshamstede (later Peterborough Abbey). Though this seems a dubious claim, and the ancient charter is in fact a 12th-century forgery, the full picture is more complex. Sir Frank Stenton considered that "Scuffanhalch", along with "Costesford" (Cosford) and "Stretford", formed part of a list of places which had once been connected with Medeshamstede; and the charter purports to have been issued by King Æthelred of Mercia, during much of whose reign the bishop of Mercia was Sexwulf (or "Saxwulf"), founder and first abbot of Medeshamstede.

The first part of the name "Shifnal" is reckoned to be a personal name, "Scuffa", while the second part, from "halh", means a valley, thus describing the town's topography.

Unusually, the name of the town has alternated through the centuries between Idsall and Shifnal. Idsall (said to be relating to potential Roman links) is mentioned in a 9th-century charter as "Iddeshale", meaning "Idi's nook" or corner. A nook is said to be an area of land of approximately 20 acres (81,000 m^{2}). It is often conjectured that the two names of Idsall and Shifnal were names of settlements on the east and west sides respectively of Wesley Brook, a brook which runs through the town, and is a tributary of the River Worfe. In the 19th century, J. C. Anderson, in his Shropshire its Early History and Antiquities, wrote that Idsall means "Hall of Ide", and that Shifnal is "Hall of Sceafa".

A Key to English Place-names has an entry for Shifnal that reads '*Scuffa's nook of land'. It was also known as Iddeshale, '*Idi's nook of land'.

== History ==
=== Pre-Norman ===
The town most probably began as an Anglian settlement, established by the end of the 7th century. The oldest part of the town is said to be the area around St Andrew's Church, Church Street and Innage Road where excavations have turned up evidence of ancient buildings.

=== Norman ===
The village, as it would have been in 1086, is recorded in the Domesday Book within the hundred of Alnodestreu. The initial part of the entry states:

Robert, son of Theobald, holds of Earl Roger Iteshale. Earl Morcar held it."

This entry records that possession was lost by the Saxon Earl Morcar when he rebelled against the Norman conquerors.

The church of St Andrew has a Norman chancel and was almost certainly built on the site of an earlier church. It was a collegiate church or minster with a chapter of priests ministering to the needs of congregations in outlying settlements. St Andrew's lost its collegiate status when it was given to Shrewsbury Abbey c. 1087.

=== Plantagenet period ===
In 1245 Walter de Dunstanville, the Crusader and lord of the manor, applied to King Henry III for, and was granted, a market charter for the town. Walter then laid out a broad market street that is Broadway, Bradford Street, Market Place and Park Street for the markets. This area to the east of the stream was known as Shifnal and gradually this name superseded Idsall as the town's name.

Just outside of Shifnal are the Caynton Caves, a system carved into the sandstone. Local legend has them made by followers of the Knights Templar 700 years ago, although Historic England – the government body responsible for historic monuments – believes the caves were probably excavated in the late 18th or early 19th Century.

=== Tudor and Stuart times ===
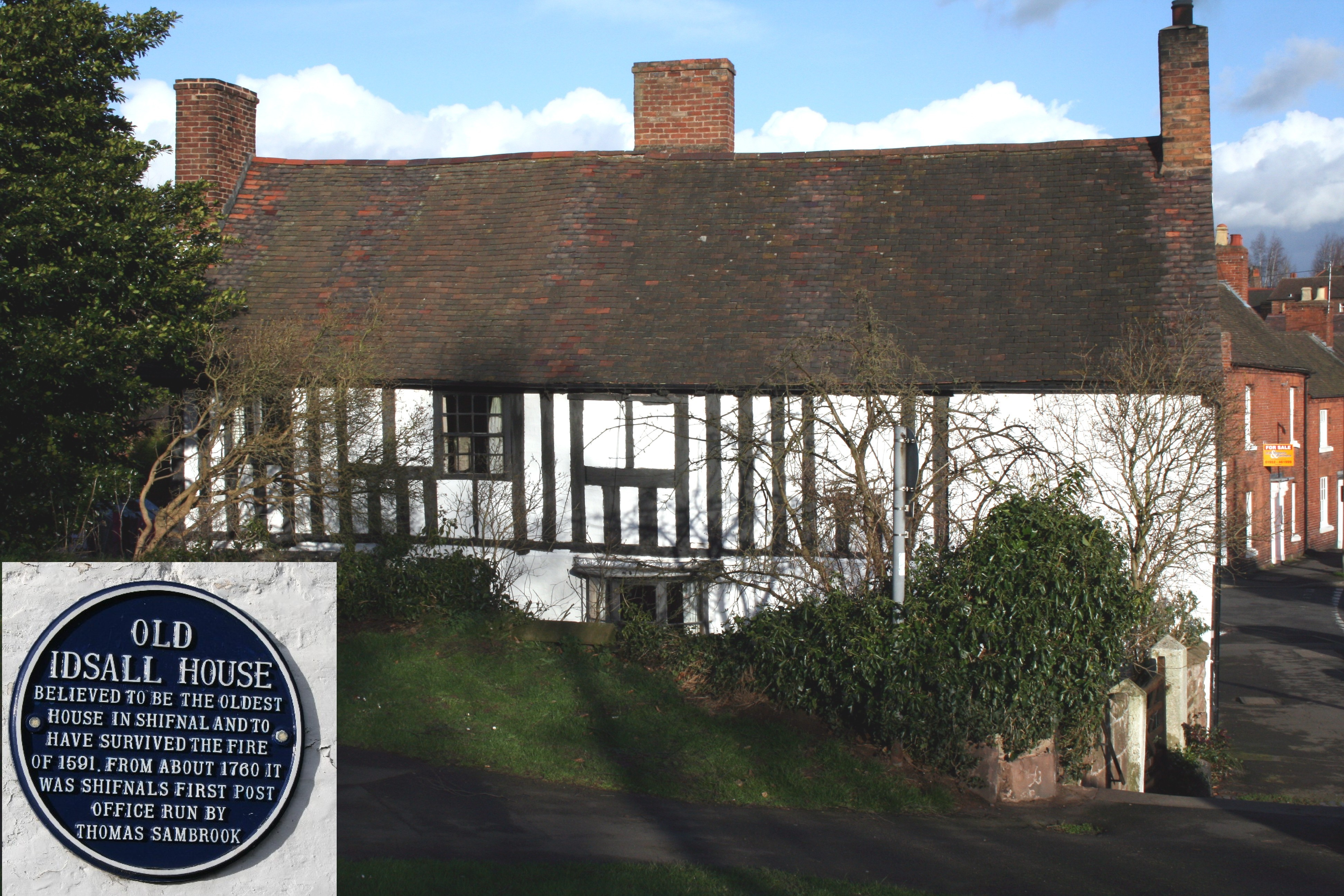
Old Idsall House, Church Street, Shifnal and blue plaque inset.

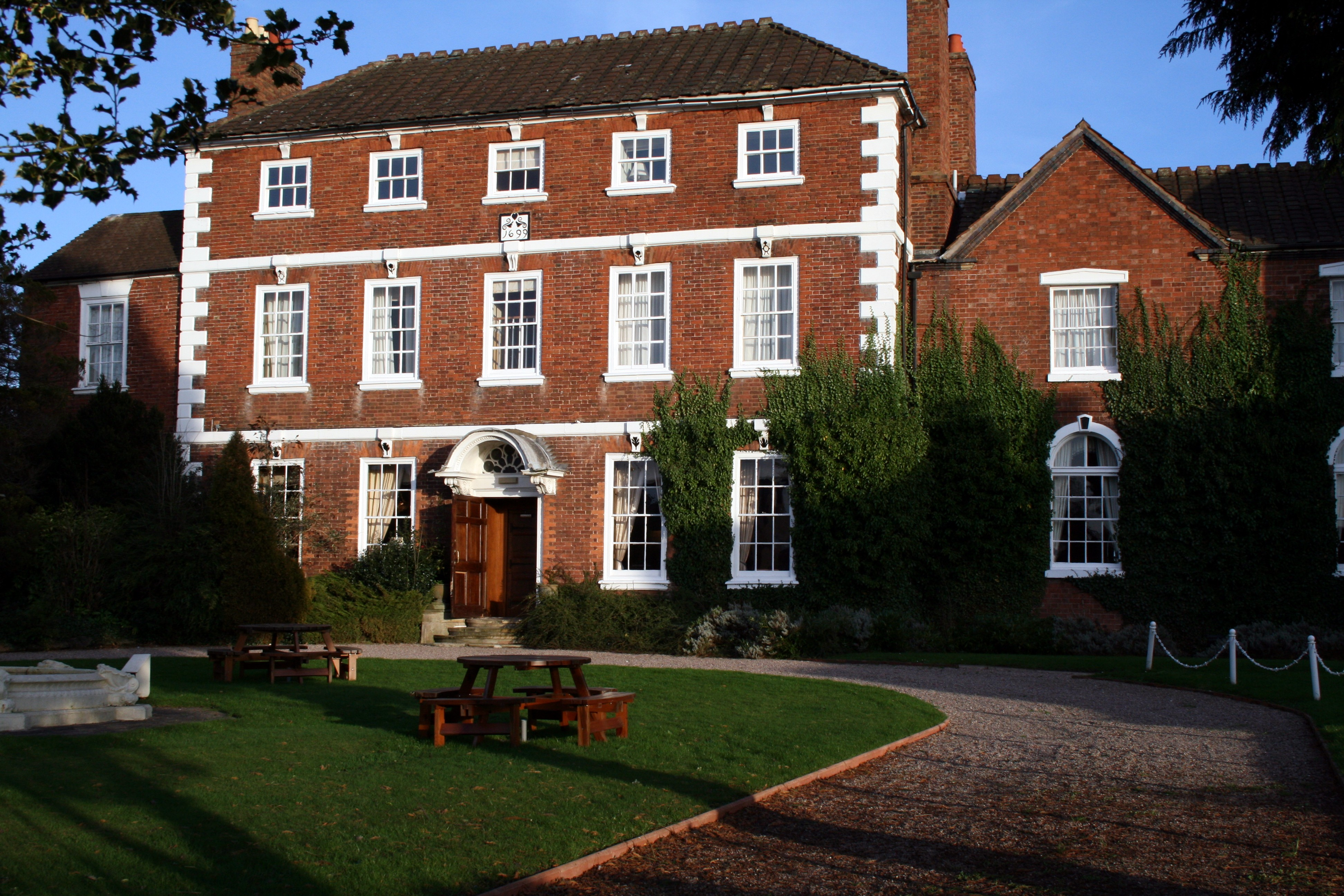
Idsall House, Park Street, Shifnal

Shifnal had something of an early industrial revolution during the late 16th century with the construction of a charcoal fired blast furnace near to the Manor House.

A fire swept through the town on 7 July 1591, setting alight the roof of the church. The fire is thought to have been started by a maidservant's candle that accidentally set fire to some hanging flax. The fire devastated many, if not all, of the buildings east of the Wesley Brook. The church, although damaged with its bells melted and reportedly reduced to its standing walls, and the timber-framed Old Idsall House at its foot to the east (a listed building), are said to be the only two buildings to have survived the fire that destroyed the rest of the settlement. This is now commemorated by a blue plaque fixed to the wall of the house. After the fire, Elizabeth I sent money to help rebuild the town.

A wall memorial tablet inside St Andrew's Church is for Mary Yates – known locally as Nanny Murphy – who walked to London as a teenager just after the Great Fire of London in 1666, married her third husband Joseph Yates when she was 92, and died at the age of 127. There is a Nanny Murphy's Lane just to the north of Shifnal. The same stone memorial tablet records that William Wakely was baptised on 1 May 1590 and was buried on 28 November 1714, after living through the reigns of eight kings and queens.

The best example of Shropshire Scroll, a 16th-century style of swirling wall painting unique to the county, was uncovered in 2010 by renovators in a Grade II listed property on Broadway. The 2 m by 2.5 m work, on display at what is now the Black Orchid hair salon, had been hidden behind a wall for more than a century.

=== 18th and 19th centuries ===
Aston Hall, built about 1720 at the east side of the town, was home to tobacco plantation and slave owners, George Austin and John Moultrie, the latter rising to be acting governor of East Florida. Austin was born in the town in 1710, the son of a mercer and went to South Carolina where he became involved in developing tobacco plantations, one of which he named Shifnal, 1,415 acres next to the Ashepoo river and which had 85 slaves. Austin became one of the wealthiest men in the colonies, but following disputes with his business partner, Henry Laurens, returned to England in 1762 and settled at Aston Hall. Austin was also responsible for the first person of colour recorded as living in Shifnal. In 1766 Benjamin Priouleu "a black servant to Mr Austin" was baptised in the town. 19 years later the parish records note that Lucy Bartlet "a black woman" was buried there. In 1771, Moultrie became Lieutenant-Governor of Florida and encouraged a road-building programme. He became acting governor when his predecessor, James Grant, was invalided home in 1771 and held the position until 1774. Three of his brothers were key players on opposing sides of the American War of Independence.

Thomas Beddoes, a well-known physician, was born in 1760 at Balcony House, named for a room projecting above the roof line, on the east side of Market Place. This building later became the Star Hotel.

A Baptist church was established in Aston Street at the end of the 18th century, but it closed down before the 20th century.

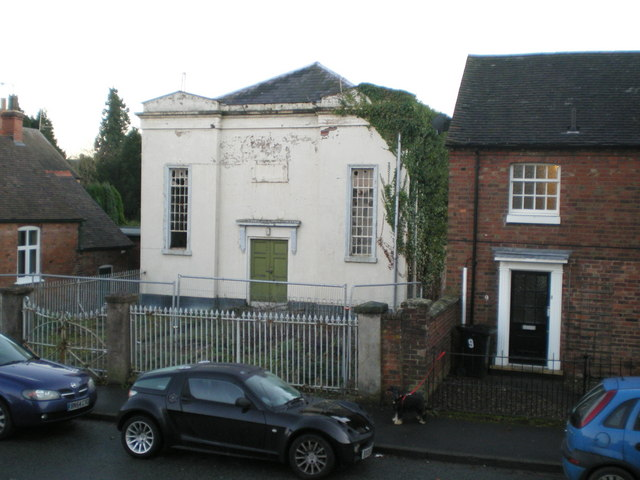
The old Magistrates' Court, 1843

Thomas Telford upgraded Watling Street, the turnpike road that passed through the town, in the late 18th century. This road carried traffic from London to Shrewsbury, Chester and Holyhead for Ireland, bringing considerable prosperity to the town.

There had been a regular stagecoach service through the town from 1681, but when mail coaches began to pass through from 1785 transport became important in the local economy, rising to 18 coaches a day by 1829. Passengers could rest from their travels at three coaching inns: the Jerningham Arms, the Star Hotel and the Unicorn. At the beginning of the 19th century, the Holyhead mail coach could travel from London to Shifnal in 27 hours: by 1831 that had been reduced that to 16.5 hours, using 150 horses along the route. However traffic was already declining by 1844, when there were only nine coaches a day. When the railways reached the town in 1849 the remaining trade rapidly disappeared.

During this period of prosperity many new houses were built, lending Shifnal a Georgian air. The name Idsall was still used to distinguish the area around the St Andrew's Church and the Manor from the market and commercial area of Shifnal.

There are records of a parish workhouse in operation in Shifnal in 1777 with accommodation for up to 40 inmates. A new larger parish workhouse was built on Park Street in 1817. It was adopted as the workhouse for the Shifnal Poor Law Union and was enlarged in 1840–1. The buildings later became part of Shifnal Hospital before being turned into homes now named Park Court.

In 1855 a house on Broadway, used by the town's 200-odd Catholics for mass, was burnt down during an anti-Irish riot. Lord Stafford replaced it in 1860 with a combination school and church he built on land he donated at the corner of Victoria Road and Shrewsbury Road. The school closed about 1917, but the building has continued as a church. The present presbytery on Victoria Road, the original school-master's house, still has Lord Stafford's coat of arms above the door.

The railway line from London and Birmingham to Holyhead was constructed through Shifnal at high level in the late 1840s. The opening of the line on 12 November 1849 brought an abrupt end to the already declining coaching traffic. The massive viaduct for the railway divided the town: its construction was a considerable engineering achievement, crossing the marshy valley of the Wesley Brook on foundations laid on coarse twigs and vast numbers of sheep fleeces. The viaducts constructed were cast by Horseley Ironworks. The original cast iron arched bridge was replaced in 1953 by a more functional but less attractive steel one.

=== The Shifnal Bank Fraud ===
One of the biggest bank frauds in Victorian Britain took place in Shifnal when a director and staff stole almost £244,000, worth the equivalent of £16 million today. Alongside the 'insider jobs' were allegations of blackmail, cover-ups and fraudsters being helped to escape.

The Shropshire Banking Company was formed in 1836 from four local banks: in Newport, Wellington, Coalbrookdale and Shifnal. Shifnal became its head office and Abraham Darby IV, of the historic iron master dynasty, was among its first chairmen.

Initially the bank seemed to do well, paying local investors dividends of 12.5 per cent a year, and was successful enough to need new premises in Park Street, Shifnal, with heavy security measures but, in 1856, the bank was forced to write off £193,834 to cover losses through fraud. It emerged that one of the directors, John Horton, had taken an unauthorised overdraft of £10,000 "against worthless security". Horton, who was being paid £300 a year as a director, was forced to resign. However his fraud was dwarfed by the £234,000 siphoned off by the bank's manager, Allen, and his cashier Gilbert over a decade.

Although the police arrived to arrest Allen in Shifnal he managed to slip away while they were on the premises, one version has him vaulting over the counter to escape, reportedly after being tipped off by the bank's directors.

Gilbert gave information about his part of the fraud on the understanding that, if he paid back what he had stolen, he would not be prosecuted. Although he returned £53,000 in cash and £87,000 worth of securities, this was still £25,000 short of what he had taken.

Allen meanwhile had taken £159,000, and it appears that this was never returned: all the directors found were vague statements about speculation in mining and railway shares.

The incident had the air of a cover-up, with the full story suppressed by the directors: newspaper reporters were barred from a crisis shareholders' meeting at the Jerningham Arms opposite; a barrister was brought in to represent the directors and "skilfully parry" questions from angry shareholders, who were prevented from reading out statements "for some insufficient reason".

Allen was never prosecuted: a report in The Shrewsbury Chronicle says Allen "told directors he would expose them and break up the company. It would seem from the fact of him having left the neighbourhood upon the hint being given to him by some of the directors, that they are afraid of his threat".

When shareholders demanded to know why Allen had been allowed to escape the directors said "it was on best advice" and refused to reveal more on "the ground of the impolicy of telling all they knew of the past".

To cover the losses the bank's directors lent it £120,000: £100,000 from Henry Dickenson, who took over as chairman, and £5,000 each from four others: they never asked for their loans to be repaid, and their cash injection was used as a foundation to raise more money from shareholders.

The Shropshire Banking Company recovered quickly under Dickenson; six months later the directors were given a unanimous vote of thanks by shareholders and it grew steadily over the next few years, finally being bought by Lloyds Bank in 1874.

=== The 20th and 21st centuries ===
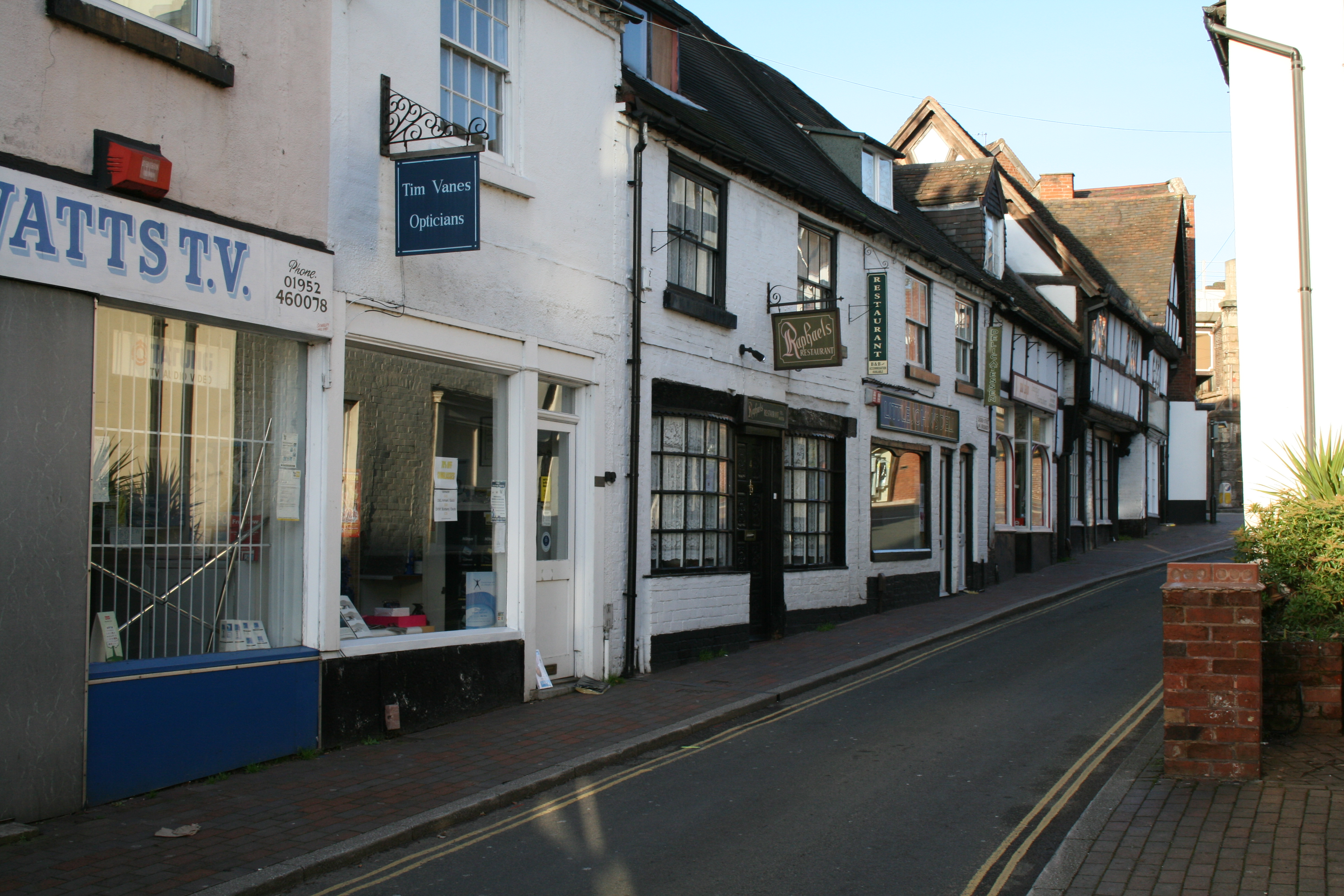
Church Street, Shifnal

Shifnal (in Red) shown with Telford.

Hinckesman's Brewery Company was established at Hinnington spring, just south of the town, in 1897, and changed its name to the Shifnal Brewery Company in 1899. After closing in 1910 the name was revived in 1927 before being acquired by Broadway Brewery (Shifnal) in 1934. In turn this was acquired by Banks's of Wolverhampton in 1960.

The Star Hotel was demolished after a fire in 1911.

The Eight Bells or Ring of Bells was occupied in 1911 by the Pitchford family, descendants of the nobility who took their name from the area of Pitchford in Shropshire. Herbert James Pitchford ran the Eight Bells among other public houses. He served in the Welsh Regiment, and died in Flanders in the First World War. His name appears on the Menin Gate in Belgium and on the war memorial in St Andrew's Church, Shifnal, near the Eight Bells public house. Today the building is occupied by the Oddfellows Wine Bar.

The railway bridge over Market Place was rebuilt in 1953: the open spandrels of the original arch were replaced with a plain lined flat panel construction.

The town expanded further during the 1960s. In 2015 it was revealed that planning permission had been granted for a total of 1,167 homes across the town, meaning its population was expected to grow by 50 per cent by 2020.

The town's branch of Barclays Bank was targeted by robbers on 6 May 1991. They drilled into the strongroom and escaped with £50,000. The same bank was subject to armed robberies in March 2013 and March 2017. Its closure was announced a few weeks after the latter, leaving Shifnal without a bank for the first time since 1824.

In 2009 one of the town's biggest employers, Wrekin Construction, went into administration with the loss of 420 jobs in Shropshire, Yorkshire, Northamptonshire and Cheshire and more than £45 million to creditors. Among the business's assets was the Gem of Tanzania, valued on the business's balance sheets at £11 million. However it emerged that the 2 kg uncut stone's value had been forged and it was eventually sold for just £8,000.

In late 2018 plans for a second, far larger expansion of Shifnal, were revealed by Shropshire Council. The proposals, which caused considerable local controversy and led to a public meeting, included up to another 1,500 homes, 40 hectares of employment land and a bypass south of the town by 2036. Large areas of farmland would be needed for the development.

== Culture ==
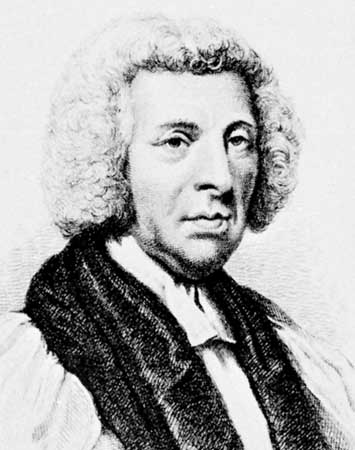
Thomas Percy

The Reliques of Ancient English Poetry was based on a manuscript discovered in Shifnal. The collection of collection of ballads and popular songs, collected by Bishop Thomas Percy and published in 1765, was primarily based on a folio discovered at the Shifnal home of Percy's friend Humphrey Pitt. It was on the floor, and Pitt's maid had been using the leaves to light fires. Once rescued Percy used 45 of the ballads in the folio for his book of 180, adding others from sources – broadside ballads collected by diarist Samuel Pepys and Collection of Old Ballads published in 1723, possibly by Ambrose Philips. Percy was encouraged to publish by his friends Samuel Johnson and the poet William Shenstone, who also found and contributed ballads.

Charles Dickens, whose grandmother was reputedly employed at nearby Tong Castle, visited the town on several occasions and many believe that the buildings in his book, The Old Curiosity Shop, were based on those in the town. Shifnal Historical Society report that he was very taken with the architecture of the town, and for that reason, he based The Old Curiosity Shop on the Unicorn public house, later known as Naughty Nell's.

The diarist Hannah Cullwick (26 May 1833 – 9 July 1909) was born in Shifnal. Cullwick revealed less-known aspects of the relations between Victorian servants and their masters. Working in domestic service, she caught the attention of Arthur Munby, a prominent barrister and philanthropist, who was making a close study of the conditions of working women. To escape poverty, she married him reluctantly and secretly in 1873, and her diaries provide detailed information on the lives of working-class Victorian servant women. She is buried, under her married name, Munby, in St Andrew's churchyard.

Mary Arnold, later known as the writer Mrs Humphry Ward, went to boarding school in the town at Rock Terrace. Her schooldays gave background for one of her later novels, Marcella (published 1894).

It is widely believed that Shifnal had some inspiration for P. G. Wodehouse's fictional town Market Blandings – or rather, the town is mentioned numerous times in the Blandings Castle saga.

In 1968, the Shifnal Carnival was launched, a revival of the Shifnal Club Day – itself deriving from an annual parade by the 'Dove Club' friendly society. Taking place on the last Saturday of June, a funfair is set up on the main street, as well as the usual procession.

In 2010, after research as part of the town plan, the Shifnal Festival was revived due to residents expressing interest for a festival of arts, culture and entertainment. It ran during three years, spawning groups such as an amateur dramatics company and a children's manga society. The last Festival was held in 2012.

== Media ==
Local news and television programmes are provided by BBC West Midlands and ITV Central. Television signals are received from either the Wrekin or Sutton Coldfield TV transmitters. Local radio stations are BBC Radio Shropshire, Hits Radio Black Country & Shropshire, Greatest Hits Radio Black Country & Shropshire, and Capital North West & Wales. The town is served by the local newspaper, Shropshire Star.

== Transport ==
Hourly buses are provided by Banga Bus service 891 Monday to Saturday, providing links to Telford, Cosford and Wolverhampton. Select Bus Services provide links to Bridgnorth and Telford.

The main railway station is on the Wolverhampton–Shrewsbury line with services to Shrewsbury, Telford, Wolverhampton and Birmingham New Street.

== Routes ==
Route	Destination	Operator	Notes
891	Telford & Wolverhampton	Banga Buses	
113/114	Telford & Bridgnorth	Select Bus Services	
115/116	Weston Heath & Bridgnorth	Select Bus Services	Saturdays only
809	Rodbaston College	Select Bus Services	Schooldays only

== Places of interest ==
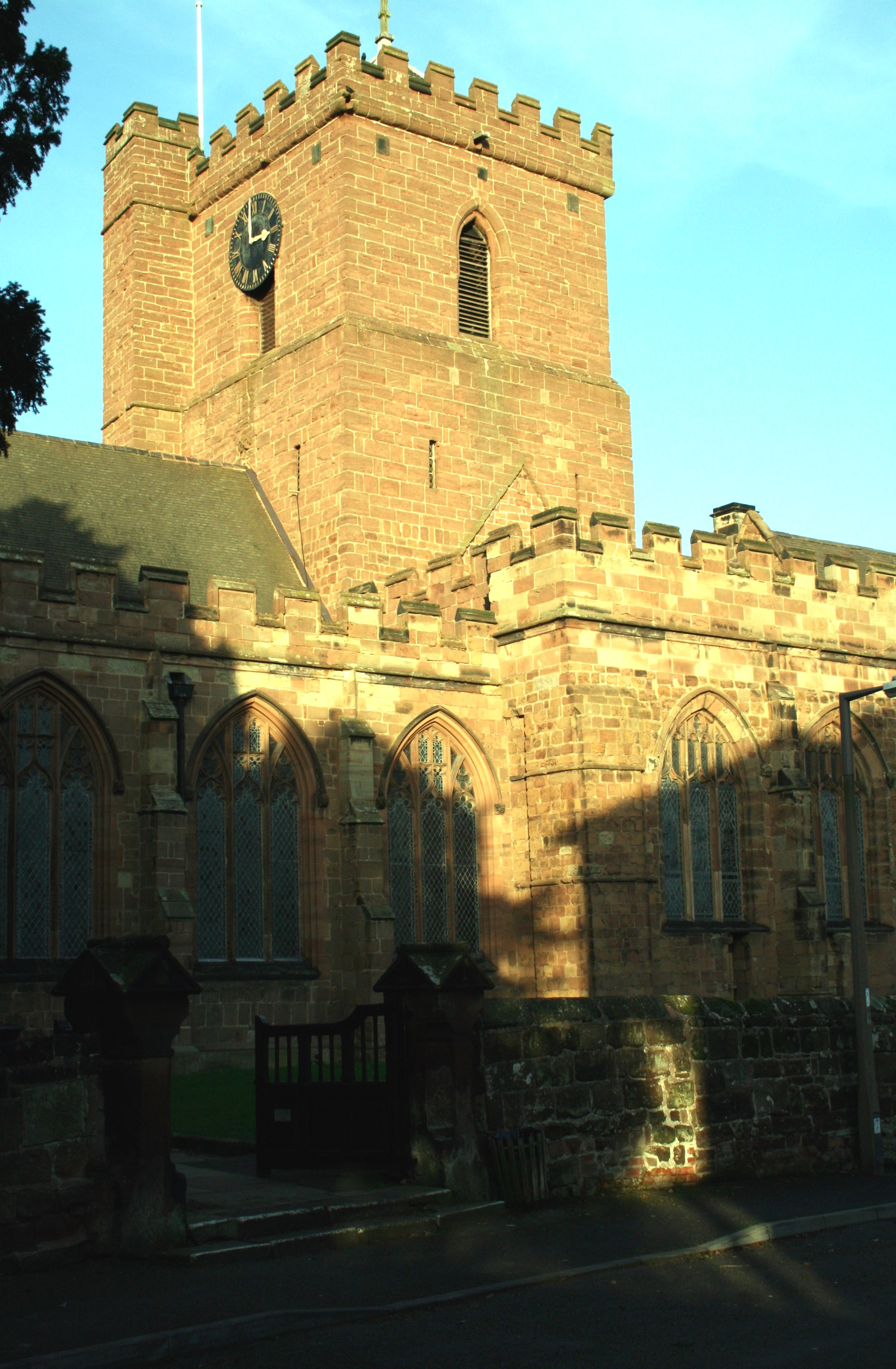
St Andrew's Church, Church Street, Shifnal

=== Churches ===
- Church of England: St Andrew's Church on Church Street has a Norman chancel, extended in about 1300, with an Elizabethan double-hammerbeam roof and was almost certainly built on the site of an older Saxon church.
- Methodist: Trinity Church, Victoria Road
- Roman Catholic: St Mary's Church, Shrewsbury Road

It also has, through Churches Together in Shifnal, its own Christian bookshop and drop-in centre, Oasis.

=== Communal services ===
A community library run by the council is located on Broadway.

The Shifnal War Memorial club, on Priorslee Road, is used by a variety of organisations and for many social events. It was opened in 1921 with an extensive recreation ground alongside, and completely rebuilt after a disastrous fire in 1982.

The Millennium Sensory Garden lies between St Andrew's Church and Innage Road. It contains a memorial erected by the Commonwealth War Graves Commission to 13 soldiers of the First World War and 4 of the Second World War, who are all buried in the churchyard. The garden is voluntarily maintained by a dedicated group of committee members and friends and obtained the Queen's Golden Jubilee Award 2003 and Green Pennant Award 2007–08.

Shifnal Police Station, behind the library, was closed in 2013, but re-opened in August 2019 as a community cafe and gardens.

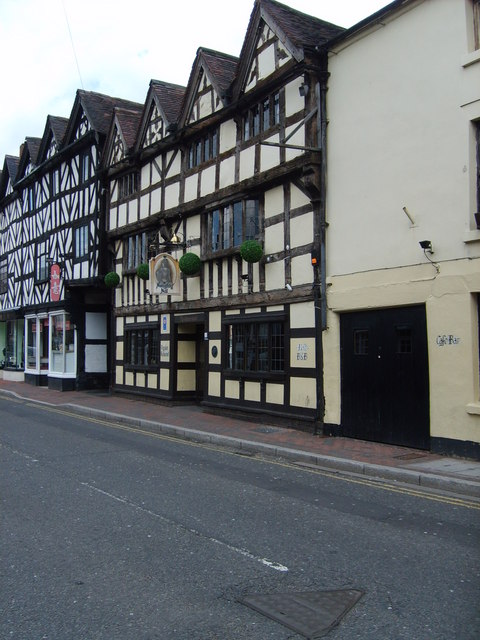
Naughty Nell

=== Sports ===
There are several sporting facilities in Shifnal, including the Idsall Sports Centre, which is attached to Idsall School; the school, in the past, receiving a number of prominent football celebrities from the nearby FA School of Excellence at Lilleshall.

The town is also home to sporting clubs including:

- Table tennis
- Rugby
- Football
- Tennis
- Cricket
- Basketball

Shifnal Town FC currently compete in the Northern Premier League Division One West, whilst Shifnal United are in the lower Mercian Regional Football League (Premier Division).

Shifnal formerly had a squash club and swimming pool for 35 years, but these have closed, replaced with a housing development.

Shifnal Golf Club was opened in 1913. Initially its course was nine holes on Lodge Hill, to the south of the town, where seven winds are said to meet. The clubhouse was then a room in a private house, Sunnyside.

== Education ==
There are several pre-school nursery and day centres in the town, as well as two primary schools: Shifnal Primary School, on Curriers Lane; and St. Andrew's Church of England Primary School, on Park Lane. The town has two further schools, Idsall School, in Coppice Green, a comprehensive secondary school; and Young Options College, in Lamledge Lane, an independent specialist secondary school.

== Notable people ==
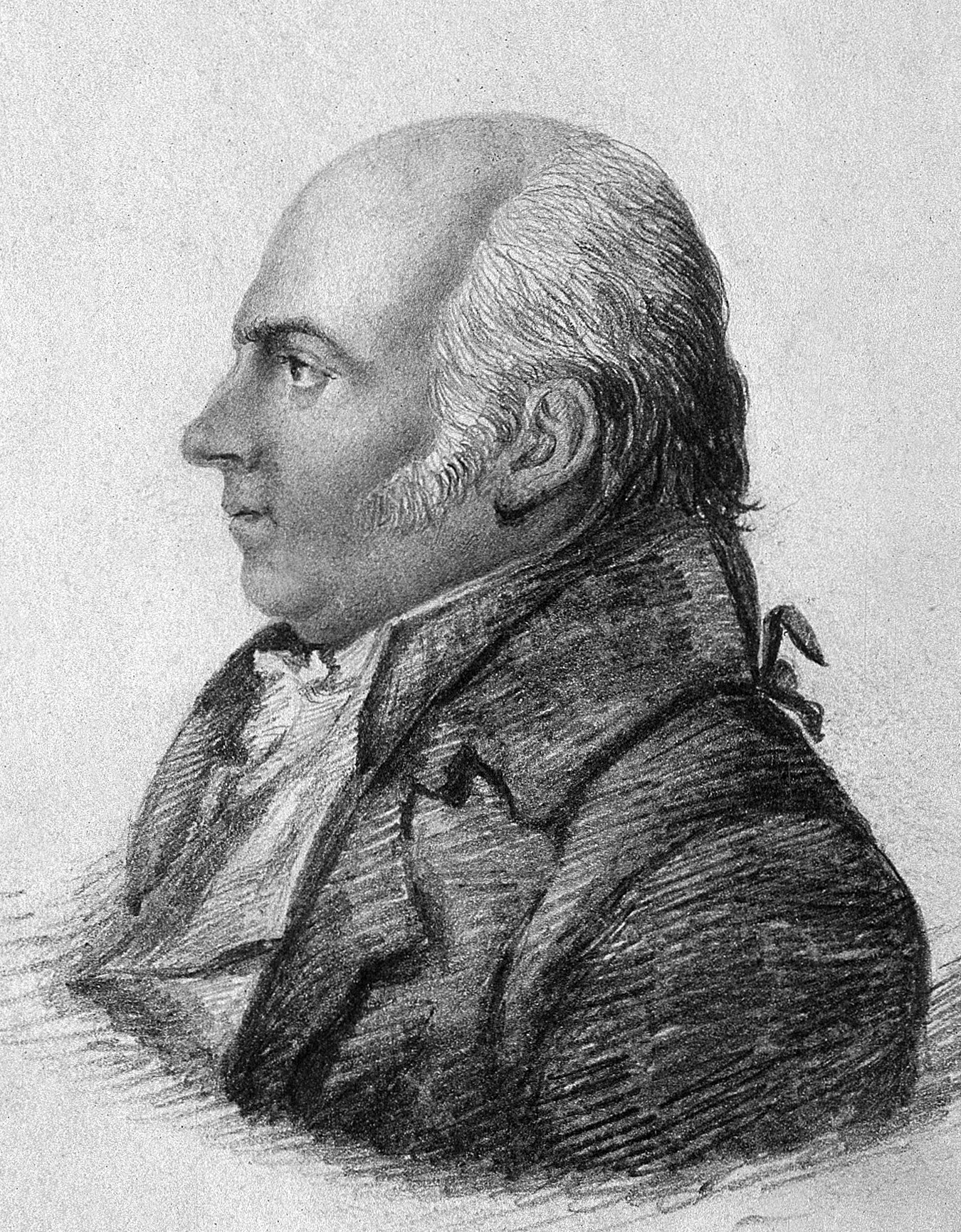
Thomas Beddoes

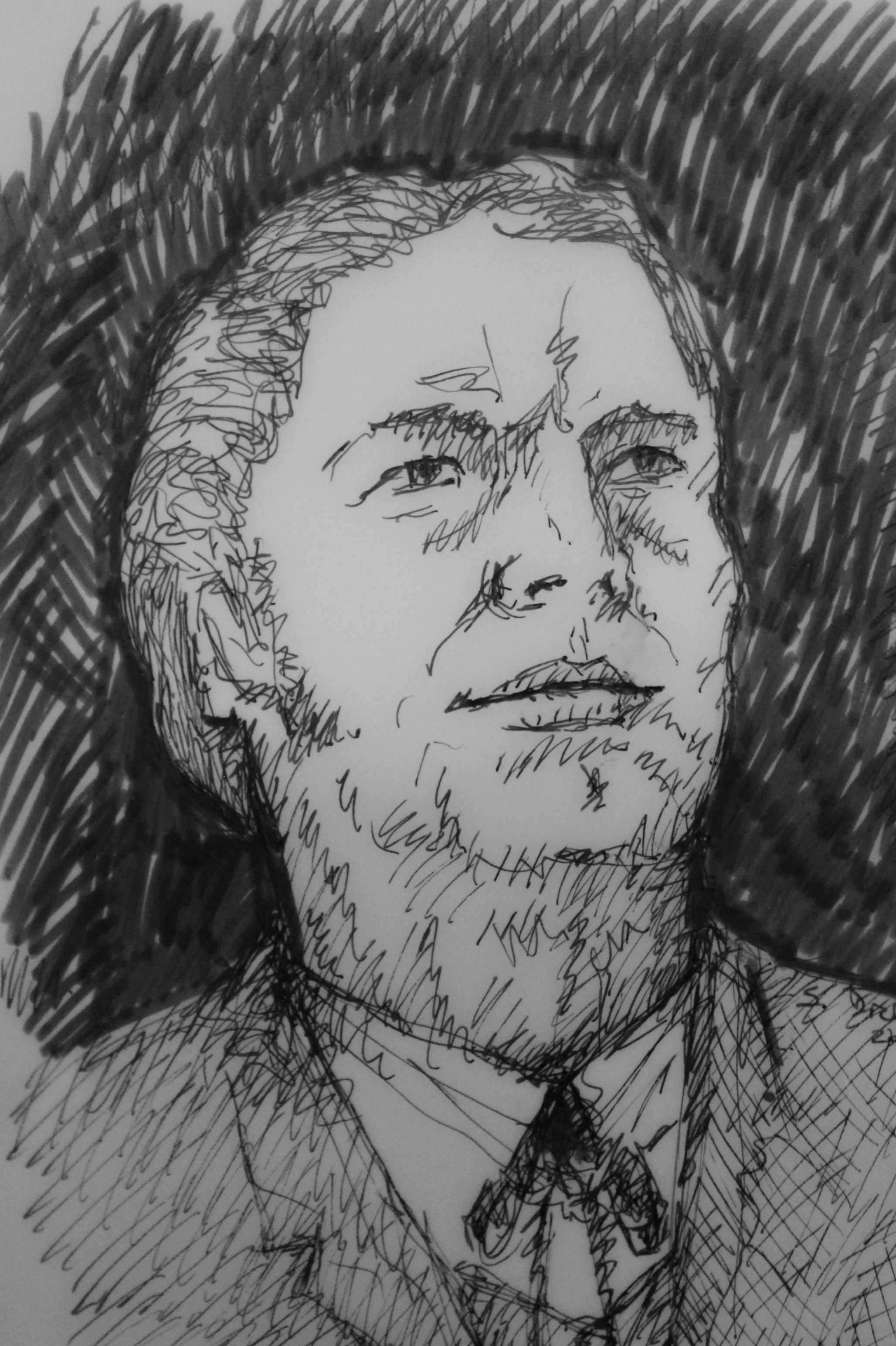
Sketch of William Hollins

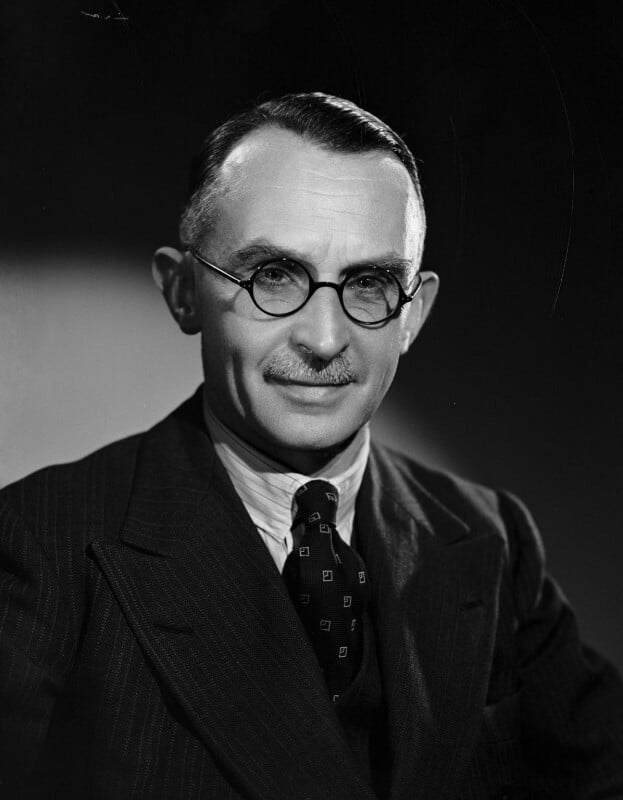
Sir Thomas Ingram Kynaston Lloyd, 1947

- George Talbot, 4th Earl of Shrewsbury (c. 1468 in Shifnal – 1538) son of John Talbot, 3rd Earl of Shrewsbury and Lady Catherine Stafford, daughter of the Humphrey Stafford, 1st Duke of Buckingham.
- Anne Howard, Countess of Arundel (1557–1630) English Catholic noblewoman and poet, died at Shifnal Manor
- Edward Bromley (1563–1626), judge and politician, lived at mansion called 'Shiffnal Grange'
- Margaret Bromley (died 1657), prominent Puritan, wife of Sir Edward.
- Thomas Brown (1662–1704) satirist poet, of "facetious memory" born son of farmer in Shifnal.
- Thomas Beddoes (1760 in Shifnal – 1808) physician and scientific writer, a reforming practitioner and teacher of medicine and worked to treat tuberculosis
- William Hollins (1763 in Shifnal – 1843) architect and sculptor
- Henry Hill Hickman (1800–1830) surgeon and pioneer of anaesthetics, lived and practiced in Shifnal in 1824.
- Hannah Cullwick (1833 in Shifnal – 1909) nursemaid and diarist.
- Mary Augusta Ward (1851–1920) novelist used her married name, Mrs Humphry Ward, brought up in Shifnal
- Captain Basil Brooke (1882 Shifnal–1929) a Royal Navy mine clearance officer.
- Sir Thomas Ingram Kynaston Lloyd (1896 in Shifnal – 1968) Permanent Under-Secretary of State for the Colonies from 1947 to 1956
- Peter Reynolds (1939 in Shifnal – 2001), archaeologist, the first director of Butser Ancient Farm
- Kevin Mulligan (born 1951 in Shifnal) philosopher, working on ontology, and Austrian philosophy
- Andrew Burn (born 1954 in Shifnal) professor and media theorist, developed the theory of the Kineikonic Mode
- Stephen Harris, (born 1968, Shifnal) music producer and mixer.
- Robert Jenrick (born 1982) politician, Reform UK MP for Newark, grew up in Shifnal
- Samuel Owen (born 2003 in Shifnal) mathematician, gave the list of integers k for which there exists some integer m such that the sum of the digits of m^k is equal to m + k. He read mathematics at Jesus College, Oxford, where he was JCR president (2024–2025) and co-president of the 2025 Turl Street Arts Festival.

=== Sport ===
- William Kenyon-Slaney (1847–1908) Footballer, cricketer, soldier, politician. First person to ever score in an international football match. Lived nearby at Hatton Grange.
- Charlie Athersmith (1872–1910), footballer played 369 games mainly for Aston Villa and Small Heath and 12 for England, died at Shifnal.
- Edwin Bennett (1893 in Shifnal – 1929) an English cricketer, who played four first-class matches
- Bert Williams (1920–2014) football goalkeeper played 406 games incl. 361 for Wolves, lived near Shifnal
- Reg Attwell (1920 in Shifnal –1986) footballer played 273 games incl. 244 for Burnley F.C.
- Jack Taylor (1930–2012) referee at 1974 FIFA World Cup final, lived at Shifnal
- Peter Alan Baker (born 1967 in Shifnal) is an English professional golfer
- Peter Lamsdale (born 1971 in Shifnal) an English cricketer, played for Berkshire

== See also ==
- Listed buildings in Shifnal
